= Bibliography of Zachary Taylor =

Zachary Taylor
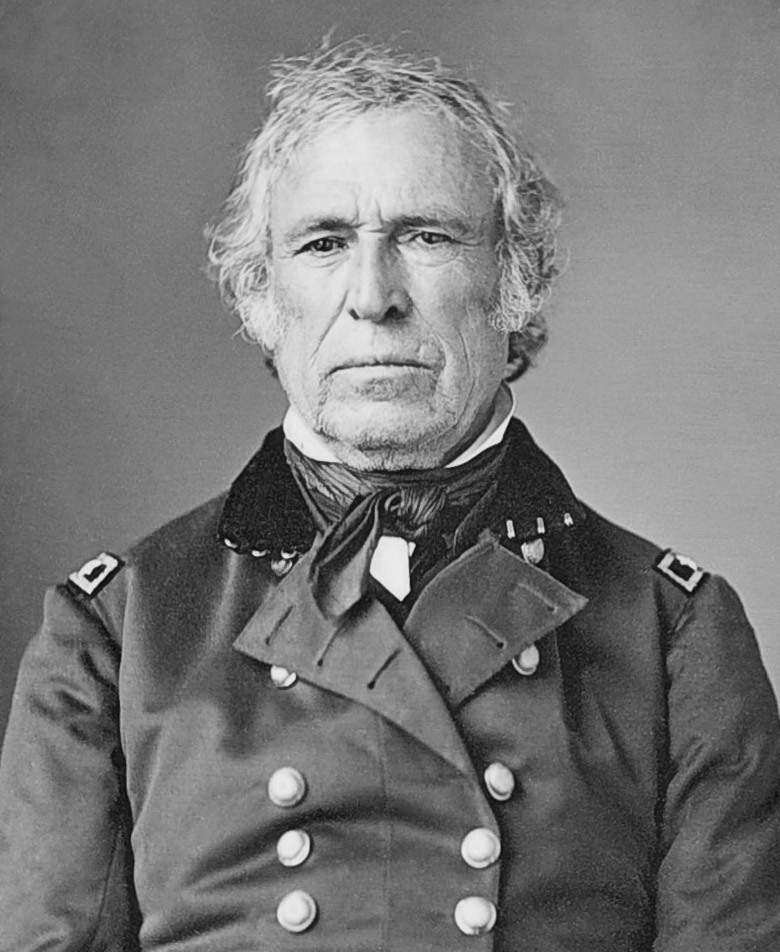
- Taylor c. 1843–45

12th President of the United States
- In office March 4, 1849 (Note: Taylor's term of service was scheduled to begin at noon EST on March 4, 1849, but as this day fell on a Sunday, Taylor refused to be sworn in until the following day. Vice President Millard Fillmore was also not sworn in on that day. Most legal scholars agree that, according to the Constitution, Taylor's term began on March 4, regardless of whether he had taken the oath.) – July 9, 1850
- Vice President: Millard Fillmore
- Preceded by: James K. Polk
- Succeeded by: Millard Fillmore

1st Commander of the Army of Occupation
- In office April 23, 1845 – July 23, 1848
- Appointed by: James K. Polk

Personal details
- Born: November 24, 1784 Barboursville, Virginia, U.S.
- Died: July 9, 1850 (aged 65) White House, Washington, D.C., U.S.
- Cause of death: Stomach disease
- Resting place: Zachary Taylor National Cemetery
- Party: Whig Party (United States)
- Spouse: Margaret Smith (m. 1810)
- Children: 6, including Sarah, Mary, and Richard
- Parents: Richard Taylor (colonel); Sarah Dabney Strother
- Profession: Military officer, planter, President of the United States

Military service
- Allegiance: United States
- Branch/service: United States Army
- Years of service: 1808–1849
- Rank: Major General
- Commands: Army of Occupation
- Battles/wars: War of 1812; Siege of Fort Harrison; Battle of Credit Island; Black Hawk War; Second Seminole War; Battle of Lake Okeechobee; Mexican–American War; Battle of Palo Alto; Battle of Resaca de la Palma; Battle of Monterrey; Battle of Buena Vista

This is a select bibliography of academic level books and journal articles, published mainly after World War II, (Note: Works published during or before World War II should be limited to areas where there are no significant post-World War II books on the subject or when the work in question has significant historical merit.) about the history of Zachary Taylor and his historical context.

Zachary Taylor (November 24, 1784 – July 9, 1850) was the 12th president of the United States, serving from 1849 until his death in 1850. Before his presidency, Taylor was a career officer in the United States Army, rising to the rank of major general and becoming a national hero for his victories in the Mexican–American War. As a result, he won election to the White House despite his vague political beliefs. His top priority as president was to preserve the Union. He died 16 months into his term from a stomach disease. Taylor had the third-shortest presidential term in U.S. history.

Works listed here are cited in the notes or bibliographies of scholarly sources. Each is published by an academic or major press, written by a recognized expert, or substantially reviewed in scholarly journals; borderline cases are omitted. A selection of primary sources are included. Many of the books below carry their own bibliographies; see the Further reading section for other bibliographies, and the External links section for historical sites, academic sites, and museums.

Citations follow APA style. (Note: Entries are in plain text APA 7 format without templates; templates are used only for reviews and notes.) Book have citations to academic journal or mainstream published reviews when available. For books only partly about the subject, relevant chapter or section titles are provided when useful and available. Translators of the original-language edition are included when possible. In cases where a title or name has appeared with more than one English spelling, the most recent published form is used and a footnote documents any earlier title under which the work appeared.

== General works ==
- Bauer, K. J. (1985). Zachary Taylor: Soldier, planter, statesman of the Old Southwest. Louisiana State University Press.
- Birkner, M. J. (2014). Zachary Taylor in office: Clay, the Whig Party, and the sectional crisis. In J. H. Silbey (Ed.), A companion to the antebellum presidents 1837–1861 (pp. 291–308). Wiley Blackwell. doi:10.1002/9781118609330.ch13
- Currie, S. (1984). Zachary Taylor, plantation owner. Civil War History, 30(2), 144–156. doi:10.1353/cwh.1984.0000
- Dyer, B. (1940). Zachary Taylor and the election of 1848. Pacific Historical Review, 9(2), 173–182. JSTOR 3633083
- Dyer, B. (1946). Zachary Taylor. Louisiana State University Press.
- Eisenhower, J. S. D. (2008). Zachary Taylor. Times Books.
- Ellis, R. J., & Walker, A. (2007). Policy speech in the nineteenth century rhetorical presidency: The case of Zachary Taylor's 1849 tour. Presidential Studies Quarterly, 37(2), 248–269. doi:10.1111/j.1741-5705.2007.02596.x
- Greenberg, G. S. (1990). Ohioans vs. Georgians: The Galphin claim, Zachary Taylor's death, and the congressional adjournment vote of 1850. The Georgia Historical Quarterly, 74(4), 575–598. JSTOR 40582231
- Hamilton, H. (1941). The Vincennes days of Zachary Taylor. Indiana Magazine of History, 37(1), 65–71. JSTOR 27787214
- Hamilton, H. (1941). Zachary Taylor in Illinois. Journal of the Illinois State Historical Society, 34(1), 84–91. JSTOR 40187977
- Hamilton, H. (1941). Zachary Taylor: Soldier of the Republic. Bobbs-Merrill.
- Hamilton, H. (1949). Zachary Taylor and Minnesota. Minnesota History, 30(2), 97–110. JSTOR 20175447
- Hamilton, H. (1951). Zachary Taylor: Soldier in the White House. Bobbs-Merrill.
- Hoyt, W. D. Jr. (1946). Zachary Taylor on Jackson and the military establishment, 1835. The American Historical Review, 51(3), 480–484. JSTOR 1840111
- Jackson, J. (1997). General Taylor's "astonishing" map of northeastern Mexico. The Southwestern Historical Quarterly, 101(2), 143–173. JSTOR 30240251
- Johnson, T. V. (2010). Punishing the lies on the Rio Grande: Catholic and immigrant volunteers in Zachary Taylor's army and the fight against nativism. Journal of the Early Republic, 30(1), 63–84. doi:10.1353/jer.0.0134
- Kersey, H. A. Jr., & Petersen, M. (1997). "Was I a member of Congress ...": Zachary Taylor's letter to John J. Crittenden, January 12, 1838, concerning the Second Seminole War. The Florida Historical Quarterly, 75(4), 447–461. JSTOR 30149063
- Kreneck, T. H. (1974). The neglected regiment: East Texas horsemen with Zachary Taylor. East Texas Historical Journal, 12(2), 22–31.
- Lynch, W. O. (1938). Zachary Taylor as president. The Journal of Southern History, 4(3), 279–294. JSTOR 2191290
- Mansfield, L. S. (1938). Melville's comic articles on Zachary Taylor. American Literature, 9(4), 411–418. JSTOR 2919993
- McKinley, S. B., & Bent, S. (1946). Old Rough and Ready: The life and times of Zachary Taylor. Vanguard Press.
- Parenti, M. (1998). The strange death of President Zachary Taylor: A case study in the manufacture of mainstream history. New Political Science, 20(2), 141–158. doi:10.1080/07393149808429819
- Smith, E. B. (1988). The presidencies of Zachary Taylor and Millard Fillmore. University Press of Kansas.
- Stegmaier, M. J. (1987). Zachary Taylor versus the South. Civil War History, 33(3), 219–241. doi:10.1353/cwh.1987.0004
- Thonhoff, R. H. (1966). Taylor's trail in Texas. The Southwestern Historical Quarterly, 70(1), 7–22. JSTOR 30236366
- Viola, H. J. (1969). Zachary Taylor and the Indiana volunteers. The Southwestern Historical Quarterly, 72(3), 335–346. JSTOR 30236510
- Walton, B. G. (1969). The elections for the Thirtieth Congress and the presidential candidacy of Zachary Taylor. The Journal of Southern History, 35(2), 186–202. JSTOR 2205712

== Background and context ==
The below items contain significant information about Zachary Taylor or significant background and context for his life and presidency.

- Coffman, E. M. (1986). The old army: A portrait of the American Army in peacetime, 1784–1898. Oxford University Press.
- Freehling, W. W. (1990). The road to disunion: Vol. 1. Secessionists at bay, 1776–1854. Oxford University Press.
- Hamilton, H. (1964). Prologue to conflict: The crisis and compromise of 1850. University of Kentucky Press.
- Haynes, S. W., & Morris, C. (Eds.). (1997). Manifest destiny and empire: American antebellum expansionism. Texas A&M University Press.
- Hietala, T. R. (1985). Manifest design: Anxious aggrandizement in late Jacksonian America. Cornell University Press.
- Holt, M. F. (1999). The rise and fall of the American Whig Party: Jacksonian politics and the onset of the Civil War. Oxford University Press.
- Holt, M. F. (2004). The fate of their country: Politicians, slavery extension, and the coming of the Civil War. Hill and Wang.
- Howe, D. W. (2007). What hath God wrought: The transformation of America, 1815–1848. Oxford University Press. doi:10.1093/oso/9780195078947.001.0001
- Mahon, J. K. (1967). History of the Second Seminole War, 1835–1842. University of Florida Press.
- Merk, F. (1963). Manifest destiny and mission in American history: A reinterpretation. Alfred A. Knopf.
- Missall, J., & Missall, M. L. (2004). The Seminole Wars: America's longest Indian conflict. University Press of Florida.
- Morrison, M. A. (1997). Slavery and the American West: The eclipse of manifest destiny and the coming of the Civil War. University of North Carolina Press.
- Nevins, A. (1947). Ordeal of the Union: Vol. 1. Fruits of manifest destiny, 1847–1852. Charles Scribner's Sons.
- Pletcher, D. M. (1973). The diplomacy of annexation: Texas, Oregon, and the Mexican War. University of Missouri Press.
- Potter, D. M. (1976). The impending crisis, 1848–1861 (D. E. Fehrenbacher, Ed.). Harper & Row.
- Prucha, F. P. (1969). The sword of the Republic: The United States Army on the frontier, 1783–1846. Macmillan.
- Rayback, J. G. (1970). Free soil: The election of 1848. University Press of Kentucky.
- Silbey, J. H. (2005). Storm over Texas: The annexation controversy and the road to Civil War. Oxford University Press. doi:10.1093/oso/9780195139440.001.0001
- Silbey, J. H. (2009). Party over section: The rough and ready presidential election of 1848. University Press of Kansas.
- Silbey, J. H. (Ed.). (2014). A companion to the antebellum presidents 1837–1861. Wiley Blackwell.
- Skelton, W. B. (1992). An American profession of arms: The Army officer corps, 1784–1861. University Press of Kansas.
- Stegmaier, M. J. (1996). Texas, New Mexico, and the Compromise of 1850: Boundary dispute & sectional crisis. Kent State University Press.
- Watson, S. J. (2012). Jackson's sword: The Army officer corps on the American frontier, 1810–1821. University Press of Kansas.
- Watson, S. J. (2013). Peacekeepers and conquerors: The Army officer corps on the American frontier, 1821–1846. University Press of Kansas.

=== The Great Debate and the Compromise of 1850 ===
- Bordewich, F. M. (2012). America's great debate: Henry Clay, Stephen A. Douglas, and the compromise that preserved the Union. Simon & Schuster.
- Campbell, S. W. (1970). The slave catchers: Enforcement of the Fugitive Slave Law, 1850–1860. University of North Carolina Press.
- Grodzins, D. (2010). "Slave law" versus "lynch law" in Boston: Benjamin Robbins Curtis, Theodore Parker, and the fugitive slave crisis, 1850–1855. Massachusetts Historical Review, 12, 1.
- Hamilton, H. (1954). Democratic Senate leadership and the Compromise of 1850. The Mississippi Valley Historical Review, 41(3), 403.
- Hamilton, H. (1957). 'The cave of the winds' and the Compromise of 1850. The Journal of Southern History, 23(3), 331.
- Hamilton, H. (1964). Prologue to conflict: The crisis and compromise of 1850. University of Kentucky Press.
- Hodder, F. H. (1936). The authorship of the Compromise of 1850. The Mississippi Valley Historical Review, 22(4), 525.
- Maizlish, S. E. (2018). A strife of tongues: The Compromise of 1850 and the ideological foundations of the American Civil War. University of Virginia Press.
- Middleton, S. (1987). The fugitive slave crisis in Cincinnati, 1850–1860: Resistance, enforcement, and Black refugees. The Journal of Negro History, 72(1–2), 20–32.
- Russel, R. R. (1956). What was the Compromise of 1850?. The Journal of Southern History, 22(3), 292.
- Stephenson, N. W. (1935). California and the Compromise of 1850. Pacific Historical Review, 4(2), 114–122.
- Waugh, J. C. (2003). On the brink of Civil War: The Compromise of 1850 and how it changed the course of American history. Scholarly Resources.

== Historiography ==
- Faulk, O. B., & Stout, J. A. Jr. (Eds.). (1973). The Mexican War: Changing interpretations. Sage Books.
- Francaviglia, R. V., & Richmond, D. W. (Eds.). (2000). Dueling eagles: Reinterpreting the U.S.-Mexican War, 1846–1848. Texas Christian University Press.
- Graebner, N. A. (1978). Lessons of the Mexican War. Pacific Historical Review, 47(3), 325–342. JSTOR 3637470
- Graebner, N. A. (1980). The Mexican War: A study in causation. Pacific Historical Review, 49(3), 405–426. JSTOR 3638563
- Mallon, F. E. (1991). Beyond insularity: The challenge of nineteenth-century Mexican history. Latin American Research Review, 26(3), 247–256. doi:10.1017/S0023879100024043
- Pubols, L. (2014). Changing interpretations of California's Mexican past. California History, 91(1), 16–22. doi:10.1525/ch.2014.91.1.16
- Robinson, C. (Comp.). (1989). The view from Chapultepec: Mexican writers on the Mexican-American War. University of Arizona Press.
- Spahr, T. W. (2014). The Mexican–American War: A historiographical overview. In C. G. Frentzos & A. S. Thompson (Eds.), The Routledge handbook of American military and diplomatic history (pp. 273–280). Routledge. doi:10.4324/9781315817347-45

== Reference works ==
- Graff, H. F. (Ed.). (2002). The presidents: A reference history (3rd ed.). Charles Scribner's Sons.

== Primary sources ==
- Fry, J. R. (2009). A life of Gen. Zachary Taylor. Applewood Books. (Original work published 1848)
- Zachary Taylor Presidential Papers Collection, The American Presidency Project at the University of California, Santa Barbara
- Zachary Taylor from the Miller Center of Public Affairs at the University of Virginia
- Zachary Taylor Papers – Library of Congress. About 650 items, 1814–1931, the bulk falling 1840–1861: general correspondence, family papers, autobiographical material, business records and military documents, with letters from Jefferson Davis, Winfield Scott and James K. Polk, and material on his son Richard Taylor's sugar plantation. Series 1 to 5 were microfilmed in 1960 and those scans carry the online collection; series 6, added after 1960, was scanned from the originals.
- Zachary Taylor Papers, finding aid – Library of Congress, Manuscript Division (MSS009193). 1.6 linear feet across nine containers plus one oversize and two microfilm reels, arranged in six series, 1814–1931. Open to research, but some items are stored off-site.
- The Correspondence of Zachary Taylor and Millard Fillmore – Center for Congressional and Presidential Studies, American University. Begun in 2020 to locate and publish the 1844–1853 correspondence of the twelfth and thirteenth presidents. Its Resources page is a curated link set covering Taylor's Louisville childhood home, the White House Historical Association on his enslaved households, and the documentary-editing bodies behind the project. The nearest thing to an active scholarly edition of Taylor's papers.
- United States Presidential Papers: Taylor, Zachary (12th) – American University Library. Points to Richardson's A Compilation of the Messages and Papers of the Presidents, 1789–1897, the Bixby edition of Taylor's Mexican War letters, and a Taylor and Fillmore study by J. J. Farrell, alongside ArchiveGrid and HeinOnline. No Taylor-specific microfilm guide.
- Letters of Zachary Taylor, from the Battle-Fields of the Mexican War (1908) – HathiTrust. Reprinted from originals in William K. Bixby's St. Louis collection, and the most-cited printed source of Taylor's own prose. Full text also at the Internet Archive.
- Zachary Taylor letters, 1846–1848 – The Huntington Library. Autograph letters signed, written during the Mexican War, mostly to his brother-in-law, the army surgeon Robert Crooke Wood: logistics and strategy, troop movements and health, supplies, Winfield Scott, and the Battle of Monterrey, with Taylor's own reading of his presidential prospects ahead of 1848. By appointment.
- Taylor-Cannon Family Collection, 1741–1949 – The Filson Historical Society, Louisville. Thirteen cubic feet of Taylor and allied family papers. Taylor items include a family register in his hand (copied), 1847–1849 correspondence, a typescript of his letter of 8 March 1847 to Edmund H. Taylor describing the Battle of Buena Vista, a congressional medal, photographs of his monument and burial vault, and a hand-drawn 1847 map of the seat of war.
- Subject browse: Taylor, Zachary, 1784–1850 – The Filson Historical Society. The card-catalogue browse for everything indexed under Taylor's name, which reaches well past the Taylor-Cannon papers. Museum and photograph holdings sit in a separate portal at Filson Online Collections.

== See also ==
- Manifest destiny
- Bibliography of Millard Fillmore
- Margaret Taylor
- Second Seminole War
- 1848 United States presidential election
