= Philip B. Williams =

American politician (died 1896)

Member of the Virginia House of Delegates from the Frederick County district
- In office 1875–1877 Serving with John F. Wall
- Preceded by: Robert W. Hunter and James Harrison Williams
- Succeeded by: Thomas T. Fauntleroy and Nimrod Whitacre

Personal details
- Died: February 23, 1896 Kernstown, Virginia, U.S.
- Children: 3
- Occupation: Politician; manufacturer

Philip B. Williams (died February 23, 1896) was an American politician and manufacturer from Virginia. He served in the Virginia House of Delegates from 1875 to 1877.

== Early life ==
Philip B. Williams was born to Benjamin Williams, a wool manufacturer. He was a member of the Williams family of the Shenandoah Valley and was related to state delegate James Harrison Williams.

== Career ==
Williams operated a fulling mill near Mountain Falls, Virginia, with his father and brother James W. They later built a woolen mill on Abrams Creek, west of Valley Pike. He served as a member of the Virginia House of Delegates, representing Frederick County from 1875 to 1877.

== Personal life ==
Williams married. He had two sons and a daughter, James, Hunter and Mrs. T. F. Eddy.

Williams was injured in a fall and died a few days later on February 23, 1896, at his home in Kernstown.
