= Thomas T. Fauntleroy =

Thomas T. Fauntleroy may refer to:

- Thomas T. Fauntleroy (lawyer) (1823–1906), Virginia attorney, politician and judge
- Thomas T. Fauntleroy (soldier) (1796–1883), his father, U.S. Army colonel
