= John F. Wall (politician) =

American politician (1799–1884)

Member of the Virginia House of Delegates from the Frederick County district
- In office 1875–1877 Serving with Philip B. Williams
- Preceded by: Robert W. Hunter and James Harrison Williams
- Succeeded by: Thomas T. Fauntleroy and Nimrod Whitacre
- In office 1865–1873 Serving with E. M. Tidball, D. J. Miller, J. S. Magill
- Preceded by: M. F. Kaufman and George W. Ward
- Succeeded by: Robert W. Hunter and James Harrison Williams
- In office 1849–1851 Serving with Algernon R. Wood and Richard M. Sydnor
- Preceded by: Algernon R. Wood and Richard M. Sydnor
- Succeeded by: Lewis A. Miller and Edwin S. Baker
- In office 1845–1848 Serving with Algernon R. Wood
- Preceded by: James H. Carson
- Succeeded by: Algernon R. Wood and Richard M. Sydnor

Personal details
- Born: 1799 Warren County, Virginia, U.S.
- Died: January 28, 1884 (aged 84) near Winchester, Virginia, U.S.
- Resting place: Mount Hebron Cemetery
- Party: Whig; Conservative
- Children: 2
- Occupation: Politician; farmer; businessman

John F. Wall (1799 – January 28, 1884) was an American politician from Virginia. He served in the Virginia House of Delegates, representing Frederick County from 1845 to 1848, 1849 to 1851, 1865 to 1873 and 1875 to 1877.

== Early life ==
John F. Wall was born in 1799 in Warren County, Virginia. When he was around two years old, his family moved to Winchester, Virginia.

== Career ==
Wall began his career as a Whig. In 1867, he became associated with the Conservative Party. He served in the Virginia House of Delegates, representing Frederick County from 1845 to 1848, 1849 to 1851, 1865 to 1873, and 1875 to 1877. During the 1869 to 1871 sessions, D. J. Miller resigned and Wall was elected to fill the vacancy. He was sergeant-at-arms of the body from 1874 to 1875. He was a farmer and had a brickmaking business.

== Personal life ==
Wall had two sons. He moved outside of Winchester and lived there for about 45 years.

Wall died of a kidney disease on January 28, 1884, aged 84, at his home near Winchester. He was buried in Mount Hebron Cemetery.
