= Edmund P. Dandridge (politician) =

American politician (died 1884)

Member of the Virginia House of Delegates from the Winchester and Frederick County district
- In office 1879–1880
- Preceded by: Nimrod Whitacre and Thomas T. Fauntleroy
- Succeeded by: Holmes Conrad

Personal details
- Died: September 29, 1884 Winchester, Virginia, U.S.
- Party: Conservative
- Spouse: Lizzie Pitts (m. 1874; died 1884)
- Occupation: Politician; lawyer

Edmund P. Dandridge (died September 29, 1884) was an American politician and lawyer from Virginia. He served as a member of the Virginia House of Delegates from 1879 to 1880.

== Early life ==
Edmund P. Dandridge was born to Adam Stephen Dandridge of The Bower.

== Career ==
In 1879, Dandridge was associated with the Conservative Party. He served as a member of the Virginia House of Delegates, representing Winchester and Frederick County, from 1879 to 1880.

Dandridge worked as a prosecuting lawyer in Frederick County for 15 years. He formed Winchester law firm Dandridge & Pendleton with Alexander R. Pendleton. He served as a senior member of the firm. He was resident council of the Baltimore and Ohio Railroad.

== Personal life ==
Dandridge married Lizzie Pitts, daughter of Charles H. Pitts, of Baltimore on December 10, 1874. His wife predeceased him in 1884. He had children. His uncle P. P. Dandridge married Mary Elizabeth Bliss, daughter of President Zachary Taylor.

Dandridge was found dead on September 29, 1884, at his office in Winchester.
