= General Wall =

General Wall may refer to:

- John F. Wall (born 1931), U.S. Army lieutenant general
- Peter Wall (British Army officer) (born 1955), British Army general
- Ricardo Wall (1694–1777), Spanish-Irish cavalry captain general

== See also ==
- Peter Walls (1927–2010), Rhodesian Army lieutenant general
- General Wahl (disambiguation)
