= Richard Taylor (Confederate general) =

American politician and Confederate general of the Civil War (1826–1879)

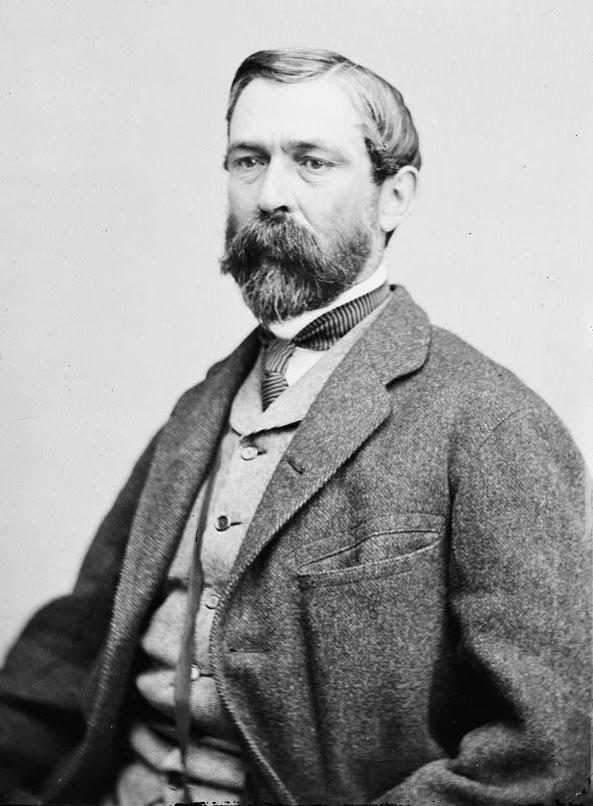
- Photo taken between 1860 and 1870

Member of the Louisiana State Senate
- In office 1855–1861

Personal details
- Born: January 27, 1826 Jefferson County, Kentucky, U.S.
- Died: April 12, 1879 (aged 53) New York City, New York, U.S.
- Resting place: Metairie Cemetery; New Orleans, Louisiana
- Party: Democratic
- Other political affiliations: Whig; American
- Spouse: Myrthe Bringier
- Children: 5
- Parents: Zachary Taylor; Margaret Smith
- Education: Yale University

Military service
- Allegiance: Confederate States
- Branch/service: Confederate States Army
- Years of service: 1861–1865
- Rank: Lieutenant General (CSA)
- Commands: 9th Louisiana Infantry
- Battles/wars: American Civil War: First Battle of Bull Run; Jackson's Valley Campaign; Seven Days Battles; Battle of Fort Bisland; Siege of Port Hudson; Red River Campaign

Richard Taylor (January 27, 1826 – April 12, 1879) was an American planter, politician, military historian, and Confederate general. Following the outbreak of the American Civil War, Taylor joined the Confederate States Army, serving first as a brigade commander in Virginia and later as an army commander in the trans-Mississippi Theater. Taylor commanded the District of West Louisiana and opposed United States troops advancing through upper northwest Louisiana during the Red River Campaign of 1864. He was the only son of Zachary Taylor, the 12th president of the United States. After the war and Reconstruction, Taylor published a memoir about his experiences.

== Early years ==
Richard Taylor was born in 1826 at Springfield, his family's plantation near Louisville, Kentucky, to Zachary Taylor, a lieutenant colonel in the United States Army at the time, and Margaret Mackall (Smith) Taylor. He was named after his paternal grandfather, Richard Lee Taylor, a Virginian who had served in the American Revolutionary War (1775–1783). Richard Taylor, nicknamed "Dick", had five older sisters, two of whom died in childhood before he was born. Three lived to adulthood: Ann Mackall Taylor, Sarah Knox Taylor, and Mary Elizabeth Taylor. The children spent much of their early lives on the American frontier, as their father was a career military officer and commanded frontier forts. All the family lived with him at these posts. As a youth, Richard was sent to private schools in Kentucky and Massachusetts.

After starting college studies at Harvard College in Cambridge, Massachusetts, Taylor completed them at Yale in New Haven, Connecticut, where he graduated in 1845. He was a member of Skull and Bones, Yale's social club. He received no academic honors, as he spent most of his time reading classical and military history books.

At the beginning of the Mexican–American War (1846–1848), Taylor visited his father in the Mexican town of Matamoros in July 1846. Reportedly, he volunteered to serve as his father's aide-de-camp.

Having to leave the war because of rheumatoid arthritis, the younger Taylor agreed to manage the family cotton plantation in Jefferson County, Mississippi. In 1850, he persuaded his father (then serving as 12th president after being elected in 1848) to purchase Fashion, a large sugar cane plantation in St. Charles Parish, Louisiana. After his father's sudden death in July 1850, Taylor inherited the sugar property.

On February 10, 1851, Richard Taylor married Louise Marie Myrthe Bringier (d. 1875), a native of Louisiana and the daughter of a wealthy French Creole matriarch, Aglae Bringier, and her husband. Steadily, Taylor added acreage to the plantation and improved its sugar works at considerable expense; he also expanded its enslaved labor force to nearly 200 people. He became one of the wealthiest men in Louisiana for his holdings. The freeze of 1856 ruined his crop, forcing him into debt with a large mortgage on the plantation. His mother-in-law, Aglae Bringier, financially aided Taylor and his wife.

In 1855, Taylor entered local politics. He was elected to the Louisiana State Senate, where he served until 1861. First affiliated with the Whig Party, he shifted to the American (Know Nothing) Party and finally joined the Democratic Party. He was sent to the first Democratic Convention of 1860 in Charleston, South Carolina, as a state delegate. There, he witnessed the Democrats' splintering. While in Charleston, he tried to devise a compromise between the two Democratic factions, but his attempts failed.

== American Civil War ==
When the American Civil War erupted, Taylor was asked by Confederate General Braxton Bragg to assist him, as a civilian aide-de-camp without pay, at Pensacola, Florida. Bragg had known Taylor from before the war and thought his knowledge of military history could help him to organize and train the Confederate forces. Taylor had been opposed to secession but accepted the appointment.

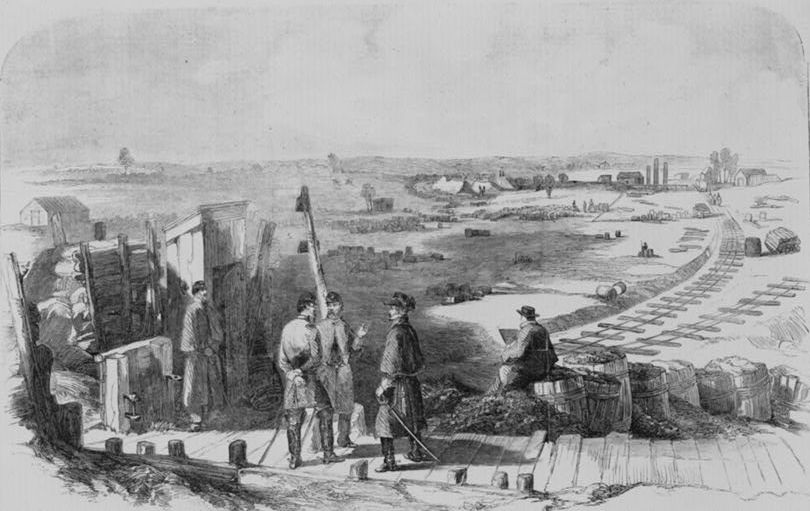
Manassas Junction, looking towards Bull Run and Centreville, Civil War-era drawing by Edwin Forbes

While training recruits, Taylor received news that he was commissioned as a colonel of the Confederate 9th Louisiana Infantry Regiment. The members of the 9th Louisiana voted for Taylor because they thought that with Taylor's connections to President of the Confederate States Jefferson Davis, widower of his late sister Sarah, the unit would be sent out sooner and see battle more quickly. On July 20, he arrived in Richmond, Virginia with his regiment and received orders from LeRoy Pope Walker, Confederate States Secretary of War, to board the train and move to take part in the First Battle of Manassas; the 9th Louisiana arrived at Manassas Junction hours after Confederate forces won the battle.

On October 21, 1861, Taylor was promoted to brigadier general, commanding a Louisiana brigade under Richard S. Ewell in the Shenandoah Valley campaign led by Stonewall Jackson. During the Valley campaign, Jackson used Taylor's brigade as an elite strike force that set a rapid marching pace and dealt swift flanking attacks. At the Battle of Front Royal on May 23, the First Battle of Winchester on May 25, and finally, at the climactic Battle of Port Republic on June 9, Taylor led the 9th Infantry in timely assaults against strong enemy positions.

His brigade consisted of various Louisiana regiments, as well as Major Chatham Roberdeau Wheat's "Louisiana Tiger" battalion. The undisciplined lot was known for its hard-fighting on the battlefield and its hard living off the battlefield. Taylor instilled discipline into the Tigers, and although Major Wheat did not agree with his methods, he came to respect Taylor.

Taylor subsequently traveled with the rest of Jackson's command to participate in the Seven Days Battles around Richmond. Attacks of rheumatoid arthritis left him crippled for days and unable to command in battle. For instance, Taylor could not leave his camp and command his brigade around this time. He missed the Battle of Gaines Mill, and Col. Isaac Seymour, commanding the brigade in his absence, was killed in action.

Taylor was promoted to the rank of major general on July 28, 1862. He was the youngest major general in the Confederacy. When Taylor was promoted over three more senior commanders, the other commanders complained of favoritism. President Davis wrote them a letter noting Taylor's leadership capabilities and promise, and stating that General Jackson had recommended Taylor. He was ordered to Opelousas, Louisiana, to conscript and enroll troops in the District of Western Louisiana, part of the Trans-Mississippi Department, west of the river.

The historian John D. Winters wrote that Taylor was:

to command all troops south of the Red River and was to prevent the enemy from using the rivers and bayous in the area. Troops were to be gathered and sent to fill up the ranks of Louisiana regiments serving in Virginia. After this, Taylor was to retain as many recruits as would be needed in the state. Light batteries of artillery were to be organized to harass passing enemy vessels on the streams. ... The enemy was to be confined to as narrow an area as possible, and communications and transportation across the Mississippi River were to be kept open.

After working as a recruiting officer, Taylor commanded the tiny District of West Louisiana. Governor Thomas Overton Moore had insistently requested a capable and dedicated officer to assemble the state's forces to counter U.S. advances.

Before Taylor returned to Louisiana, U.S. forces in the area had raided throughout much of southern Louisiana. During the spring of 1862, U.S. soldiers came upon Taylor's Fashion plantation and plundered it.

Taylor found the district almost entirely devoid of troops and supplies. However, he did the best with these limited resources by securing two capable subordinates, veteran infantry commander Alfred Mouton, and veteran cavalry commander Thomas Green. These two commanders would prove crucial to Taylor's upcoming campaigns in the state.

During 1863, Taylor directed an effective series of clashes with U.S. Army forces over control of lower Louisiana, most notably at Battle of Fort Bisland and the Battle of Irish Bend. These clashes were fought against U.S. Maj. Gen. Nathaniel P. Banks for control of the Bayou Teche region in southern Louisiana and his ultimate objective of Port Hudson. After Banks had successfully pushed Taylor's Army of Western Louisiana aside, Banks continued on his way to Alexandria, Louisiana, before returning south to besiege Port Hudson. After these battles, Taylor formulated a plan to recapture Bayou Teche, along with the city of New Orleans, and to halt the Siege of Port Hudson.

=== Operations to recapture New Orleans ===
Taylor planned to move down the Bayou Teche, overcome the lightly defended outposts and supply depots, and then capture New Orleans, which would cut off Banks' U.S. army from its supplies. Although his plan met with approval from Secretary of War James A. Seddon and President Jefferson Davis, Taylor's immediate superior, Edmund Kirby Smith, felt that operations on the Louisiana banks of the Mississippi across from Vicksburg would be the best strategy to halt the Siege of Vicksburg. From Alexandria, Louisiana, Taylor marched his army up to Richmond, Louisiana. There, he was joined by Confederate Maj. Gen. John G. Walker's Texas Division, who called themselves "Walker's Greyhounds". Taylor ordered Walker's division to attack U.S. soldiers at two locations on the Louisiana side of the Mississippi. The ensuing Battle of Milliken's Bend and Battle of Young's Point failed to accomplish the Confederate objectives. After initial success at Milliken's Bend, that engagement failed after U.S. gunboats shelled the Confederate positions. Young's Point ended prematurely as well.

In response to the Confederates summarily executing black U.S. soldiers, U.S. Army General Ulysses S. Grant wrote a letter to Taylor, urging the Confederates to treat captured black U.S. soldiers humanely and professionally and not murder them. Grant stated the official position of the U.S. government was that black U.S. soldiers were sworn military men and not insurrectionist slaves, as the Confederates asserted they were. After the battles, Taylor marched his army, minus Walker's division, down to the Bayou Teche region. From there, Taylor captured Brashear City (Morgan City, Louisiana), which yielded tremendous amounts of supplies, materiel, and new weapons for his army. He moved within the outskirts of New Orleans, which was being held by a few green recruits under Brig. Gen. William H. Emory. While Taylor was encamped on the outskirts and preparing for his attack against the city, he learned that Port Hudson had fallen. He retreated his forces up the Bayou Teche to avoid capture.

=== Red River Campaign ===
In 1864, Taylor defeated U.S. General Nathaniel P. Banks in the Red River Campaign with a smaller force, commanding the Confederate forces in the Battle of Mansfield and the Battle of Pleasant Hill on April 8–9. He pursued Banks back to the Mississippi River and, for his efforts, received the thanks of the Confederate Congress. At these two battles, the two commanders whom Taylor had come to rely on: U.S. Brigadier Generals Alfred Mouton and Thomas Green, were killed while leading their men into combat. On April 8, 1864, Taylor was promoted to lieutenant general, despite having asked to be relieved because of his distrust of his superior in the campaign, General Edmund Kirby Smith. The Congress of the Confederate States issued a joint resolution, which officially thanked Taylor and his soldiers for their military service during the Red River Campaign.

=== Last days of the war ===
Taylor was given command of the Department of Alabama, Mississippi, and East Louisiana. After General John Bell Hood's disastrous Franklin-Nashville Campaign in Tennessee and near destruction of his army at the Battle of Nashville, Taylor was briefly given command of the Army of Tennessee, until most of its remnant was sent to contest Sherman's march further north through the Carolinas from Savannah, Georgia. He surrendered his department at Citronelle, Alabama, the third and last major Confederate force remaining east of the Mississippi, to U.S. General Edward Canby on May 4, 1865, almost a month after Appomattox Courthouse and was paroled three days later. The rest of his command was paroled on May 12, 1865, in Gainesville, Alabama. In his memoir "Destruction and Reconstruction," Taylor told of what happened as he surrendered his troops. A Union officer present, not identified but referred to by Taylor as "a general officer who had recently left Germany to become a citizen and soldier of the United States", informed him that "we of the South would speedily recognize our ignorance and errors...and rejoice in the results of the war". Taylor wrote that Canby and another Union general attempted "in vain" to quiet the tactless officer. Taylor responded with irony, explaining to the officer that his ancestors had settled in Virginia in 1608; that his grandfather had commanded a regiment that fought against Hessians at Trenton in the Revolutionary War; and that his father had been president of the United States. Taylor apologized for his ignorance and regretted that his forebears "had found no time to transmit to me the correct ideas of the duties of American citizenship".

== Military prowess ==
Taylor had no military experience until the Civil War broke out. However, most of Taylor's contemporaries, subordinates, and superiors spoke many times of his military prowess as he proved himself capable both in the field and in departmental command. Nathan Bedford Forrest commented about Taylor, "He's the biggest man in the lot. If we'd had more like him, we would have licked the Yankees long ago." Charles Erasmus Fenner, an officer in the Confederate Trans-Mississippi Department and post-war Louisiana Supreme Court justice, asserted that "Dick Taylor was a born soldier. Probably no civilian of his time was more deeply versed in the annals of war, including the achievements and personal characteristics of all the great captains, the details and philosophies of their campaigns, and their strategic theories and practice."

Thomas J. "Stonewall" Jackson and Richard S. Ewell frequently commented on their conversations with Taylor about military history, strategy, and tactics. In particular, Ewell stated that he came away from his conversations with Taylor more knowledgeable and impressed with the information Taylor possessed. Stonewall Jackson recommended promoting Taylor to major general and putting him in command of Confederate forces in western Louisiana. Taylor was one of only three lieutenant generals in the Confederacy who did not graduate from West Point (the others being Forrest and Wade Hampton III).

In his 1879 memoir, Taylor modestly attributed his progress as a commanding officer during the war to two habits:

I early adopted two customs, and adhered to them throughout the war. The first was to examine at every halt the adjacent roads and paths, their direction and condition; distances of nearest towns and cross-roads; the country, its capacity to furnish supplies, as well as general topography, etc., all of which was embodied in a rude sketch, with notes to impress it on memory. The second was to imagine while on the march an enemy before me to be attacked, or to be received in my position, and make the necessary dispositions for either contingency. My imaginary manoeuvres were sad blunders, but I corrected them by experience drawn from actual battles, and can safely affirm that such slight success as I had in command was due to these customs.

== Postwar life ==
The war destroyed Taylor's home, including his much-prized library, sugar cane property, and facilities. He moved his family to New Orleans at the war's end and lived there until his wife died in 1875. He was president of the Boston Club 1868–1873. After his wife's death, he moved with their three daughters to Winchester, Virginia. From there, he regularly traveled to see friends and colleagues in Washington, D.C., and New York City.

Taylor wrote a memoir, Destruction and Reconstruction: Personal Experiences of the Late War (1879), considered one of the most credible accounts of the Civil War. The historian T. Michael Parrish wrote that, "Taylor finally gave enhanced dignity to defeat and surrender."

Taylor remained active in Democratic Party politics. He interceded with President Andrew Johnson to secure the release of former Confederate President Jefferson Davis, who was then still held at Fort Monroe, and was a leading political opponent of Reconstruction policies. On April 12, 1879, eighteen years to the day since the Battle of Fort Sumter, he died of dropsy (edema related to congestive heart failure) in New York City. He was visiting his friend and political ally Samuel L. M. Barlow I, a former Louisiana state senator. Taylor's body was returned to Louisiana for burial at Metairie Cemetery, New Orleans.

== Family ==
Richard Taylor was the only son of Margaret Mackall Smith and President Zachary Taylor. His sister Sarah Knox Taylor was the first wife of Jefferson Davis but died of illness in 1835, three months after their marriage. His sister Mary Elizabeth, who had married William Wallace Smith Bliss in 1848, served as her father's White House hostess. Although Taylor chose to join the Confederacy, his uncle, Joseph Pannell Taylor, served in the Union Army as a Brigadier General.

Richard and Marie (née Bringier) Taylor had five children, two sons and three daughters: Louise, Elizabeth, Zachary, Richard, and Myrthe. Their two sons died of scarlet fever during the war, losses that affected both parents deeply.

== Legacy ==
- The Lt. General Richard Taylor Camp #1308, Sons of Confederate Veterans in Shreveport, Louisiana, is named for General Taylor; the camp was chartered in 1971.
- Jackson B. Davis, a state senator from Shreveport, wrote a biographical article about Taylor that was published in 1941.
- A full-length biography, T. Michael Parrish's, Richard Taylor, Soldier Prince of Dixie, was published in 1992.
- In his 2023 revised and expanded study, "Confederate Patton: Richard Taylor and the Red River Campaign," military historian Samuel W. Mitcham Jr. portrays Taylor as a brilliant commander who successfully defeated a much larger Union force, showcasing the campaign as one of the most surprising defeats in U.S. military history and highlighting Taylor's strategic leadership and the challenges faced by the Confederate Army during this critical period in the Civil War.

== Works ==
- Taylor, Richard. Destruction and Reconstruction: Personal Experiences of the Late War. J.S. Sanders & Co., 2001 [1879]. ISBN 1-879941-21-X. First published in 1879 by D. Appleton.
- Works by Richard Taylor at Project Gutenberg
- Works by or about Richard Taylor at the Internet Archive

== See also ==
- List of American Civil War generals (Confederate)
