= Archibald Magill Fauntleroy =

American army officer

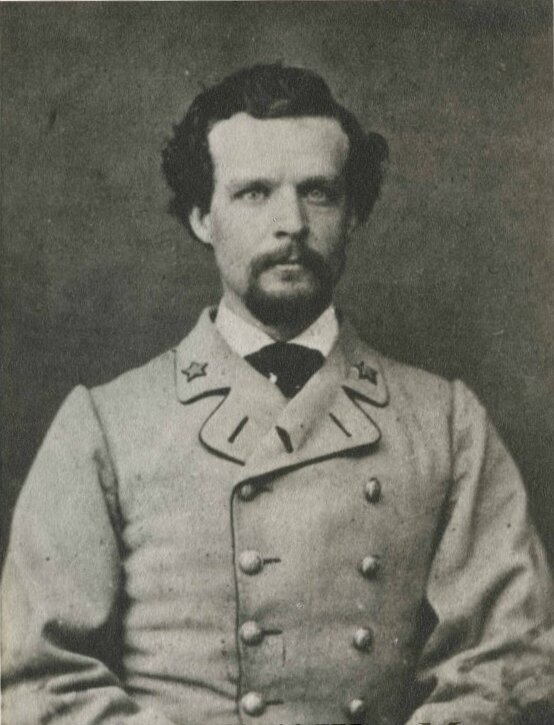
- Born: 8 July 1837; Warrenton
- Died: 19 June 1886; Staunton
- Occupation: Medical doctor
- Father: Thomas T. Fauntleroy
- Relatives: Thomas T. Fauntleroy, Mary Thurston Fauntleroy Barnes

Archibald Magill Fauntleroy (8 July 1837 in Warrenton, Virginia – 19 June 1886 in Staunton, Virginia) was a medical doctor. He was born on July 8, 1836. He graduated in medicine from the University of Pennsylvania in 1856, and in 1857 entered the United States Army as assistant surgeon; but, upon the start of the Civil War, he and his brother, a lieutenant in the navy, resigned at the same time with their father, Thomas T. Fauntleroy. He became a surgeon in the Confederate army, and was president of the board for the admission of surgeons, and chief officer on the medical staff of Gen. Joseph E. Johnston, and served with him until the battle of Seven Pines. He was then ordered to build and organize the hospitals at Danville, Virginia, and afterward had charge of the military hospital at Staunton, Virginia, until the war ended. He remained and practised at Staunton after the war, and was for several years superintendent of the lunatic asylum at that place. His contributions to medical literature include papers on potassium bromide, chloral hydrate, the use of chloroform in obstetrical practice, and a “Report upon Advance in Therapeutics,” which was printed in the Transactions of the Virginia Medical Society. He died on June 19, 1886.

== Family ==
A daughter, Elizabeth Whitney Fauntleroy, married Robert Kennon Clark in November 1896. Another daughter, Catharine Brooks Fauntleroy, married Henry Clay Miller on April 8, 1902. A third daughter, Louise Conrad Fauntleroy, married Henry Hamilton Seabrook in November 1909.
