= James Harrison Williams =

American politician (1836–1903)

Member of the Virginia House of Delegates from the Frederick County district
- In office 1874–1875 Serving with Robert W. Hunter
- Preceded by: E. M. Tidball and John F. Wall
- Succeeded by: John F. Wall and Philip B. Williams

Member of the Iowa House of Representatives
- In office January 1, 1860 – January 12, 1862

Personal details
- Born: 1836
- Died: December 7, 1903 (aged 66–67) Woodstock, Virginia, U.S.
- Party: Democratic
- Spouse: Cora De Novelle Pritchartt
- Children: 1
- Parent: Samuel C. Williams (father)
- Education: University of Virginia
- Occupation: Politician; lawyer; journalist

James Harrison Williams (1836 – December 7, 1903) was an American legislator, newspaper correspondent, and lawyer. He wrote for a newspaper in Dubuque, Iowa while he was an Iowa state representative. Williams later entered the military as a Confederate. He then served in the Virginia House of Delegates.

== Early life ==
James Harrison Williams was the son of Virginia state legislator and slave owner Samuel C. Williams. He was related to Virginia state delegate Philip B. Williams.

Williams spent his early life in the Shenandoah Valley in Virginia, later moving to Dubuque, Iowa after graduating from the University of Virginia in 1857. Later that year, he became a part of the law firm that was owned by his brother in law John T. Lovell.

== Career ==
Williams was elected as state representative as a Democrat. During this time, he was a correspondent for the newspaper Dubuque Herald. On January 1, 1860, Williams became part of the Iowa Legislature's Eighth General Assembly until January 12, 1862. In March 1861, his father called for Virginia to secede from the Union. In March 1862, Iowa Governor Samuel J. Kirkwood started a legislative session for Iowa's war effort. When a bill came to the United States House of Representatives that prevented rendering aid to rebels, Williams said a proposal that went further than the Fugitive Slave Act of 1850, stating that it should be made illegal for Iowa citizens to even countenance the escape of fugitive slaves which would make a person's moral stance illegal. There were many objections and the issue was tabled.

He wrote editorials for the Dubuque Herald and criticized Abraham Lincoln for suspending habeas corpus. On July 12, 1862, a crowd threatened that they would destroy the offices of the Dubuque Herald. Williams reportedly carried horse pistols so that he could defend the newspaper. He was elected to the Iowa Democratic National Convention, but he moved back to Virginia on the day it happened.

== Later life ==
Williams entered the military as Confederate by recruiting troops for R. Preston Chew's Horse Artillery in the 7th Virginia Cavalry, in which he later became a lieutenant. He was later a Judge Advocate General in the Cavalry Corps, Army of Northern Virginia under J.E.B. Stuart and then later under Wade Hampton III. Williams served as a member of the Virginia House of Delegates, representing Frederick County from 1874 to 1875.

Williams moved to Woodstock, Virginia in 1893 and married Cora De Novelle Pritchartt. They had a daughter named Nannie W. Williams. He practiced law at the firm Williams and Brothers. He died on December 7, 1903, at his home in Woodstock.
