= Kernstown, Virginia =

Unincorporated community in Virginia, United States

- Unincorporated community
- Location within Virginia Location within the United States
- Coordinates: 39°8′42″N 78°11′21″W
- Country: United States
- State: Virginia
- County: Frederick
- City: Winchester
- Time zone: UTC−5 (Eastern (EST))
  - Summer (DST): UTC−4 (EDT)
- GNIS feature ID: 1499623

Kernstown is an unincorporated community within the independent city of Winchester, Virginia, United States. Parts of Kernstown also lie within Frederick County. It is centered along the Valley Pike U.S. Route 11. During the Civil War, the first and second Battles of Kernstown were fought here.

Adam Kern, Sr. (1742-1799) was of German origin, and migrated from York County, Pennsylvania to Frederick County in 1765. He settled three miles south of Winchester along the Great Wagon Road. The town of Kernstown was named for his son, Adam Kern, Jr. (1773-1855).

Previous names include:

- Opequon - at the intersection of the "Great Wagon Road" – now Hwy 11 – and Opequon Creek
- Hogue's Tavern or Hogue's Ordinary – named after a tavern located at the intersection of the "Great Wagon Road" – now Hwy 11 – and Opequon Creek
- Kernsville – Settlement on Adam Kern, Sr.'s land. (His brother Michael Kern (1744-1814) purchased 33 acres in 1766 and 36 acres in 1767, and sold all to Adam Kern, Sr. in 1773). It is along the "Great Wagon Road" (now Hwy 11), south of Winchester near Opequon Creek.
- Kernstown – The town was officially established by an act of the Virginia Assembly in 1799. The town was named after Adam Kern, Jr., son of Adam Kern, Sr.

== Notable people ==
- Philip B. Williams (died 1896), Virginia state delegate

== See also ==
- Battle of Kernstown I
- Battle of Kernstown II
