= Roscoe Charles Wilson =

United States Air Force general

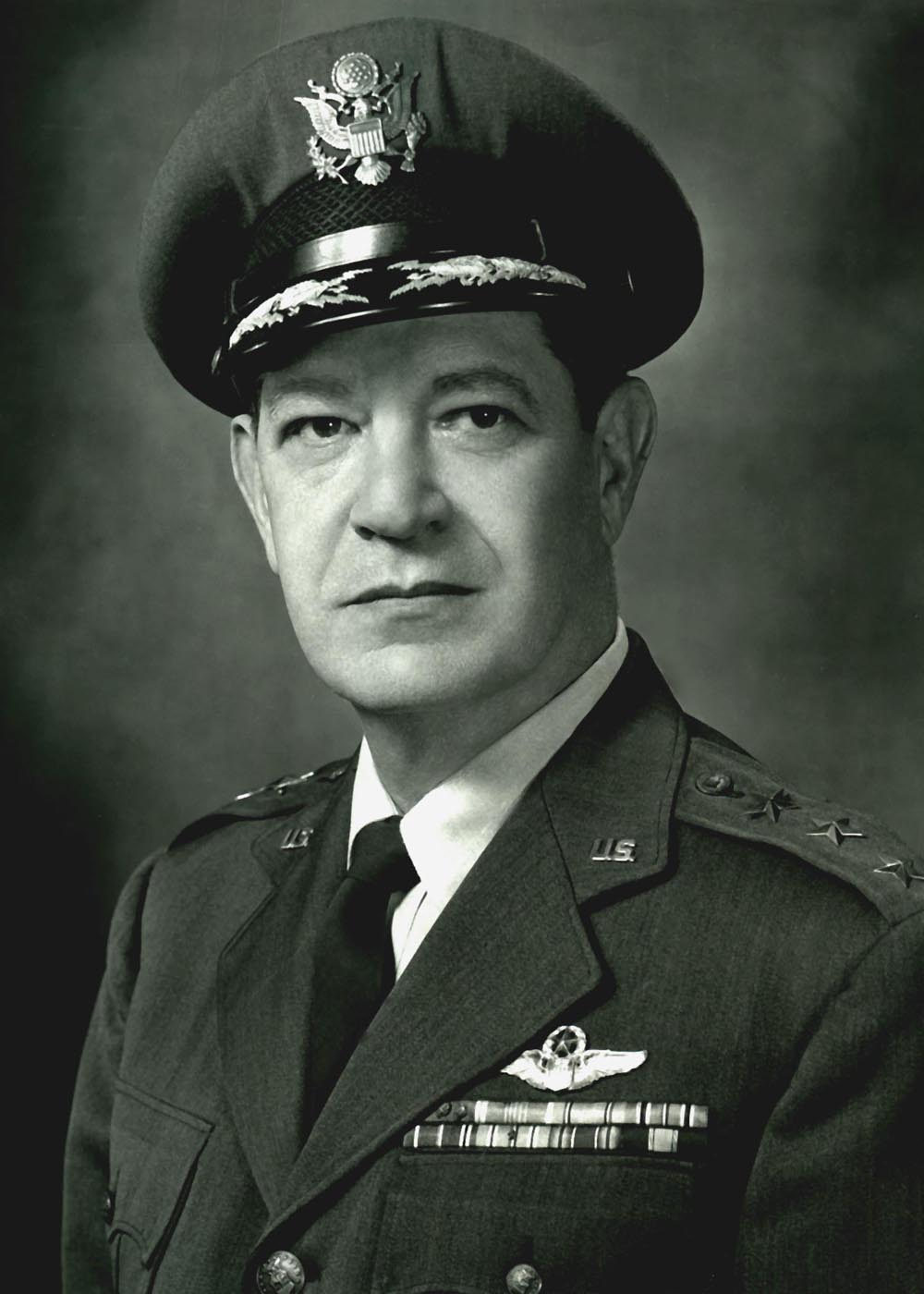
- Lieutenant General Roscoe C. Wilson
- Born: June 11, 1905; Centralia, Pennsylvania
- Died: August 21, 1986 (aged 81); Louisville, Kentucky
- Burial place: Zachary Taylor National Cemetery
- Alma mater: United States Military Academy (BS)
- Military career
- Allegiance: United States of America
- Branch: United States Army; United States Air Force
- Service years: 1928–1961
- Rank: Lieutenant General
- Nickname: Bim
- Commands: Third Air Force
- Conflicts: World War II: Air raids on Japan; Occupation of Japan
- Awards: Distinguished Service Medal; Legion of Merit (3)

Roscoe Charles Wilson (June 11, 1905 – August 21, 1986) was a United States Air Force general who was Commandant of the Air War College from 1951 to 1954 and Deputy Chief of Staff, Development, from 1958 to 1961.

A 1928 graduate of the United States Military Academy at West Point, Wilson was commissioned into the United States Army as a second lieutenant in the field artillery but underwent flying training and, on receiving his pilot's wings, transferred to the United States Army Air Corps in 1929. He attended the Air Corps Engineering School at Wright-Patterson Field, Ohio and was assigned to the Aircraft Design Section of the Aircraft Laboratory there, where he worked on the development of the XB-15, B-17 and XB-19.

During World War II, Wilson was Chief of Development Engineering at United States Army Air Forces (USAAF) headquarters, and was the USAAF liaison officer to the Manhattan Project. In December 1944 he became Chief of Staff of the 316th Bombardment Wing. Its B-29s deployed to Okinawa in June 1945, and he participated in the last air raids on Japan. After the war ended he was involved in a survey of the damage done by the bombing of Hiroshima and Nagasaki. In 1947, he became one of the Deputy Chiefs of the Armed Forces Special Weapons Project.

From October 1951 to May 1954 Wilson was Commandant of the Air War College at Maxwell Air Force Base, Alabama. He then became commander of the Third Air Force in the United Kingdom. He was promoted to lieutenant general on July 1, 1958, when he became Deputy Chief of Staff, Development. He retired from the Air Force in 1961 and became president and chairman of Allied Research.

== Early life and career ==
At West Point in 1928

Roscoe Charles Wilson was born in Centralia, Pennsylvania, on June 11, 1905, the son of an Army officer, Colonel Everett R. Wilson. He entered the United States Military Academy at West Point as a cadet on July 1, 1924, and graduated 48th in the class of 1928. He was commissioned as a second lieutenant in the field artillery on June 9, 1928, but on September 8 he commenced flight training at Brooks Field, Texas. After further training at the Advanced Flying School at Kelly Field, Texas he received his pilot's wings, and transferred to the United States Army Air Corps on November 21, 1929.

Wilson's first posting was to the 1st Observation Squadron at Mitchel Field, New York. In 1929 he married Elizabeth Robinson, a Vassar College graduate from Harrods Creek, Louisville, Kentucky in a ceremony at Christ Church Cathedral in Louisville. Their son Charles E. Wilson would also attend West Point, graduating with the class of 1954.

Wilson attended the Air Corps Engineering School at Wright-Patterson Field, Ohio from July 1932 to June 1933. After graduating, he was assigned to the Aircraft Design Section of the Aircraft Laboratory there, where he worked on the development of the P-39, XB-15, B-17 and XB-19. He was promoted to first lieutenant on February 1, 1934, and was Director of the Special Research and Test Laboratory and Director of Accessory Design and Test Laboratory.

Wilson came back to West Point in July 1937 as an instructor in the Department of Natural and Experimental Philosophy, as the Science Department was then known. He was promoted to captain on July 9, 1938. From May to August 1939, he attended the Air Corps Tactical School, after which he returned to West Point as an assistant professor. While there he built a wind tunnel, and wrote a book, entitled Preliminary Airplane Design, which was published in 1941.

== World War II ==
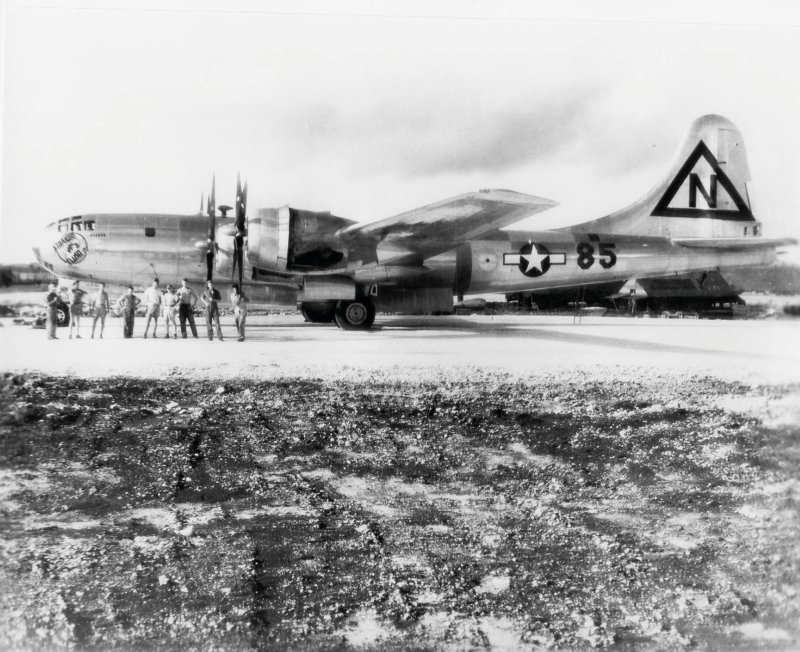
Silverplate B-29 Straight Flush. B-29 bombers required special modifications to carry nuclear weapons.

In June 1940, Wilson was posted back to Wright Field as Assistant Chief of the Air Laboratory of the Air Materiel Command, where he was promoted to major on January 31, 1941, lieutenant colonel on February 1, 1942, and colonel on March 1, 1942. He became Assistant Chief of Development Engineering at United States Army Air Forces (USAAF) Headquarters in Washington, DC, on May 1, 1942, and then its Chief on June 2, 1943. As such, he reported to Major General Oliver P. Echols, the head of the Air Materiel Command.

The Chief of USAAF, General Henry H. Arnold, designated Echols as the USAAF liaison with the Manhattan Project. In turn, Echols designated Wilson as his alternative, and it was Wilson who became Manhattan Project's main USAAF contact. The director of the Manhattan Project, Major General Leslie Groves later wrote that:

[Wilson] was a most fortunate choice, for his personality and professional competence ensured the smooth co-operation essential to our success. Through his efforts, the necessary air support was always provided by the subordinate Air Force commands, if not willingly, at least without delay. While I can say the same of every other Air Force officer with whom I had any dealings in the project, I have always felt particularly grateful to Wilson, for he had to bear the brunt of all our many minor problems with the Air Force as well as a major responsibility for a number of our principal activities. I am sure that he must have had many difficult moments with his Air Force colleagues, as he denied them, for security reasons, information they considered essential to understand the reasons for his requests.

Wilson was posted to Britain from March to April 1944, where he was involved in an exchange of technical information with the Royal Air Force. In December 1944 he became Chief of Staff of the 316th Bombardment Wing, which was then based at Colorado Springs, Colorado, but soon moved to Topeka, Kansas. Its B-29s deployed to Okinawa in June 1945, and he participated in the last air raids on Japan. After the war ended he was involved in a survey of the damage done by the bombing of Hiroshima and Nagasaki.

== Cold War ==
After the war, Wilson served in the Office of the Assistant Chief of Air Staff for Materiel and Supply, the Office of the Deputy Commander of the Army Air Force, and Office of the Deputy Chief of Staff for Research and Development. On July 26, 1947, he became one of the deputy chiefs of the Armed Forces Special Weapons Project, with the rank of brigadier general from April 1948. He also served on the Military Liaison Committee of the United States Atomic Energy Commission. He became Deputy Assistant Deputy Chief of Staff, operations, for Atomic Energy, in July 1948, and Assistant Deputy Chief of Staff, Operations, for Atomic Energy, in February 1950, although he remained on the Military Liaison Committee. He was promoted to major general on August 11, 1950.

From October 1951 to May 1954 Wilson was Commandant of the Air War College at Maxwell Air Force Base, Alabama. He then became commander of the Third Air Force in the United Kingdom, also becoming head of the Military Assistance Advisory Group for the United Kingdom on November 1, 1956. At the time, the Third Air Force was responsible for the only tactical nuclear weapons in Europe, so Wilson was a logical choice as commander. After returning to the United States in July 1957, he became the Air Force member of the Weapons Systems Evaluation Group in the Office of the Assistant Secretary of Defense for Research and Development. He was promoted to lieutenant general on July 1, 1958, when he became Deputy Chief of Staff, Development. In a reorganization of the area on July 1, 1961, he became Deputy Chief of Staff, Research and Technology.

Wilson retired from the Air Force on November 1, 1961. His decorations included the Distinguished Service Medal and the Legion of Merit with two oak leaf clusters. He became president and chairman of Allied Research in Concord, Massachusetts, a defense contractor, but retired in 1963, and moved to Harrods Creek, Louisville, Kentucky. He died on August 21, 1986, and was buried in Zachary Taylor National Cemetery in Louisville.
