= Margaret Taylor =

First Lady of the United States from 1849 to 1850

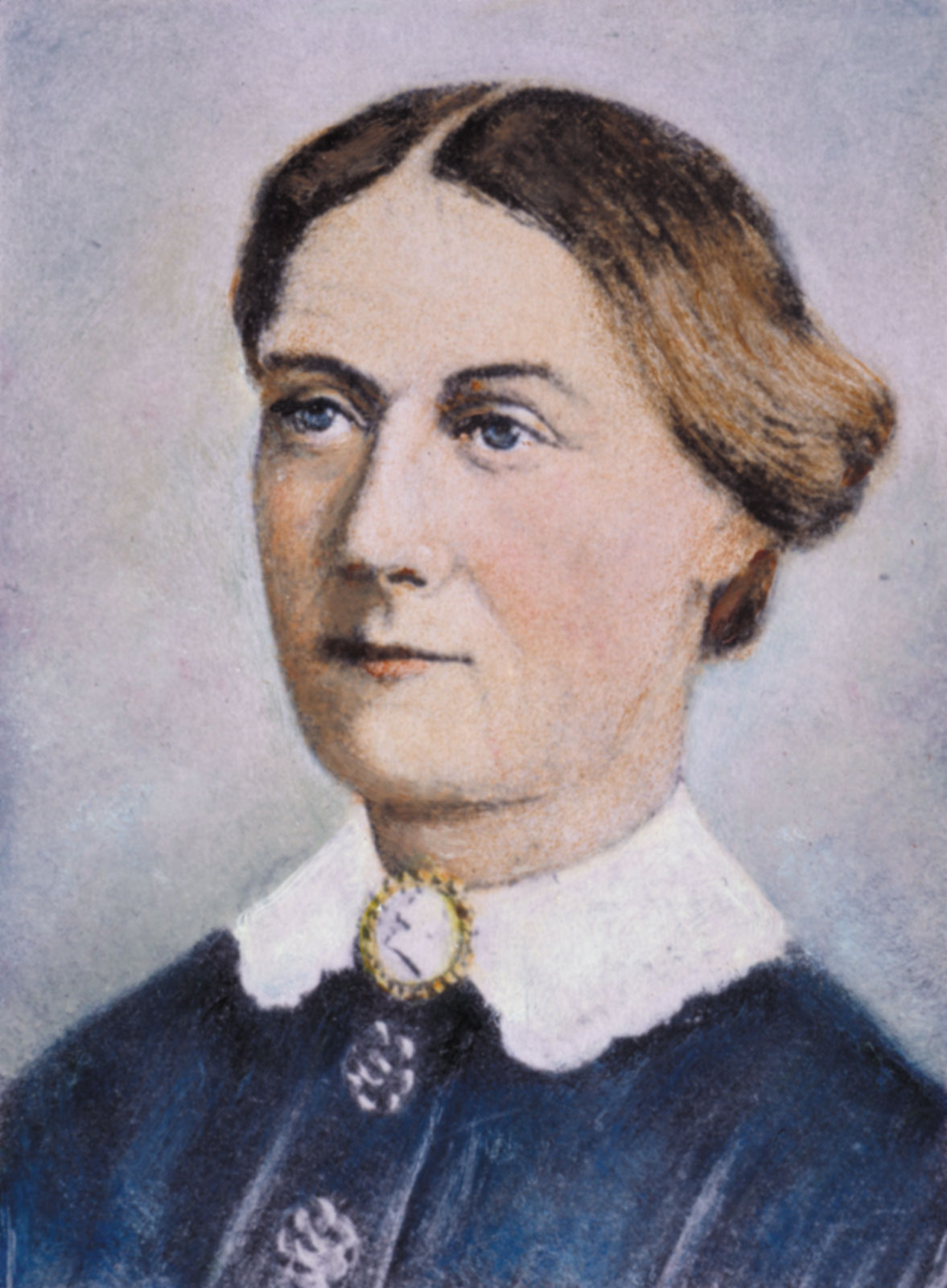
- Portrait of Taylor

First Lady of the United States
- In role March 4, 1849 – July 9, 1850
- President: Zachary Taylor
- Preceded by: Sarah Polk
- Succeeded by: Abigail Fillmore

Personal details
- Born: Margaret Mackall Smith; September 21, 1788 Calvert County, Maryland, U.S.
- Died: August 14, 1852 (aged 63) Pascagoula, Mississippi, U.S.
- Resting place: Zachary Taylor National Cemetery
- Spouse: Zachary Taylor (m. 1810; died 1850)
- Children: 6, including Sarah Knox, Mary Elizabeth, and Richard Taylor

Margaret Mackall Taylor (née Smith; September 21, 1788 – August 14, 1852) was the first lady of the United States from 1849 to 1850 as the wife of President Zachary Taylor. She married Zachary in 1810 and lived as an army wife, accompanying her husband to his postings in the American frontier. She had six children, two of whom died in childhood while the remaining four were sent to boarding schools in the eastern United States. After a brief period of stable domestic life in the 1840s, her husband was elected President of the United States to her dismay in 1848. She managed the White House from the upstairs residence while she delegated her responsibilities as White House hostess to her daughter. She was highly reclusive throughout her tenure as first lady, which ended abruptly with her husband's death in 1850. She lived in obscurity until her death two years later.

== Early life and education ==
Margaret Mackall Smith was born on September 21, 1788, in Calvert County, Maryland. Her father was Walter Smith, a prosperous Maryland planter from a prominent family and a veteran officer of the American Revolution. Her mother was Ann Mackall Smith. Smith was homeschooled, learning skills that would allow her to fulfill a domestic role. These included reading and writing, arithmetic, music, embroidery, dancing, and riding. When Smith was ten years old, her mother died. She would thereafter live with her mother's parents. As an adult, Smith was educated at a finishing school in New York City. When her father died in 1804, she moved in with her sister in Louisville, Kentucky. She met Lieutenant Zachary Taylor while in Kentucky in 1809, and after a seven month long courtship, she married him on June 21, 1810 in her sister's log house.

== Frontier life ==
The Taylors lived on the American frontier, regularly moving to different camps and barracks. Margaret was one of the few military wives that accompanied their husbands into the frontier, though there were also long periods of separation when Margaret was unable to travel with Zachary. While in the frontier, they had six children: Ann Mackall in 1811, Sarah Knox in 1814, Octavia Pannill in 1816, Margaret Smith in 1819, Mary Elizabeth in 1824, and their only son Richard in 1826. She was forced to raise them in the sub-optimal conditions of military camps. When they came of school age, they were sent to the Eastern United States with relatives. Margaret and Zachary wished to give their children educational opportunities that they themselves never had. Their children spent many years in boarding schools, sometimes going years without seeing their parents.

Taylor was a devout lifelong Episcopalian, and her faith gave her reassurance while she endured the burdens of frontier life. While they were in Bayou Sara, Louisiana, in 1820, the Taylors were afflicted by what was then diagnosed as bilious fever. Their children Octavia and Margaret died that year. Taylor herself came close to death, and she was devastated by the loss of her children. In 1828, the Taylors found residence in a house where Zachary was stationed at Fort Snelling. In 1832, they had access to a larger house while Zachary was in command of Fort Crawford, where they lived until 1836. At this home, Taylor held two slaves that did farm work with her.

== War and presidential election ==
Taylor was beset by another tragedy in 1835 when her daughter Sarah died of malarial fever at the age of 21, only three months after marrying Jefferson Davis. Taylor was involved in the war effort during the Second Seminole War after her husband was stationed in Florida in 1837. She assisted in treating the wounded and promoting morale among the soldiers. She was able to return to domestic life after her husband was given leave in 1840 and they collected their daughter Betty from her boarding school. It was only then that they had their own home together in Baton Rouge, Louisiana. Taylor declined one of the larger homes that were available in favor of a small cottage.

Zachary was called to serve in the Mexican–American War in 1845. This separation was particularly difficult for Margaret, and one rumor suggests that she swore to give up public life if her husband returned from the war alive. During the war, she saw to the establishment of a chapel for military wives in Baton Rouge that would eventually become the St. James Episcopal Church. Though she had never been a healthy person, her health degraded more severely around this time, and she had only limited mobility by the time of her husband's return. Her husband's success in the war won him national acclaim, and he was nominated by the Whig Party in the 1848 presidential election. She strongly opposed his presidential run, insisting it would "shorten both our lives." Taylor prayed nightly that he would lose the election, but to her disappointment, he was elected president. One week before her husband's inauguration, she declined an invitation to dinner from the incumbent president and first lady, allowing her daughter to accept the invitation instead. Despite her strong reservations, however, she was happy for her husband's success. Though she attended her husband's inauguration, rumors spread that she had not.

== First Lady of the United States ==
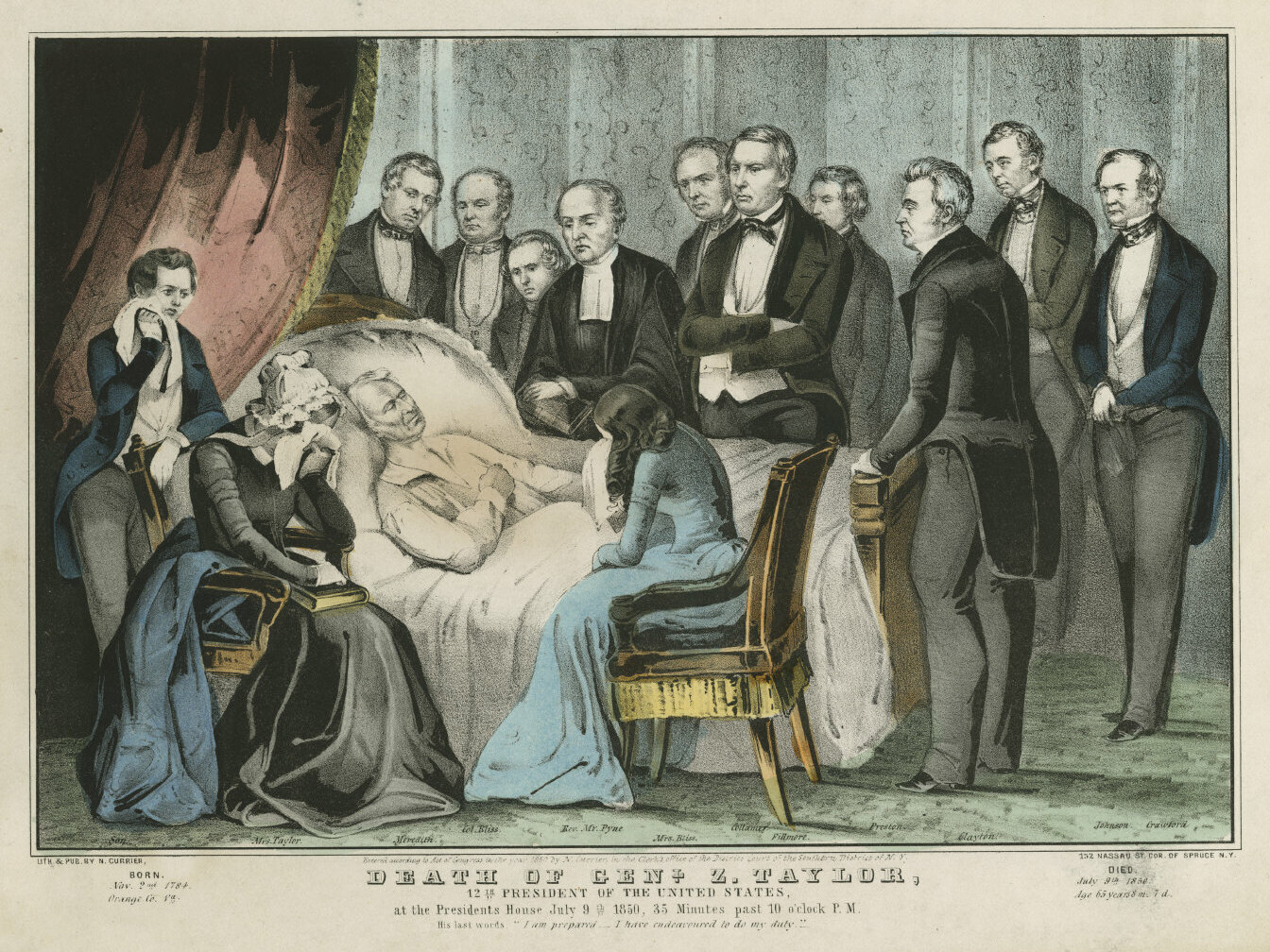
A depiction of Zachary Taylor's death. The artist did not know what Margaret Taylor looked like, so her face is obscured by a handkerchief.

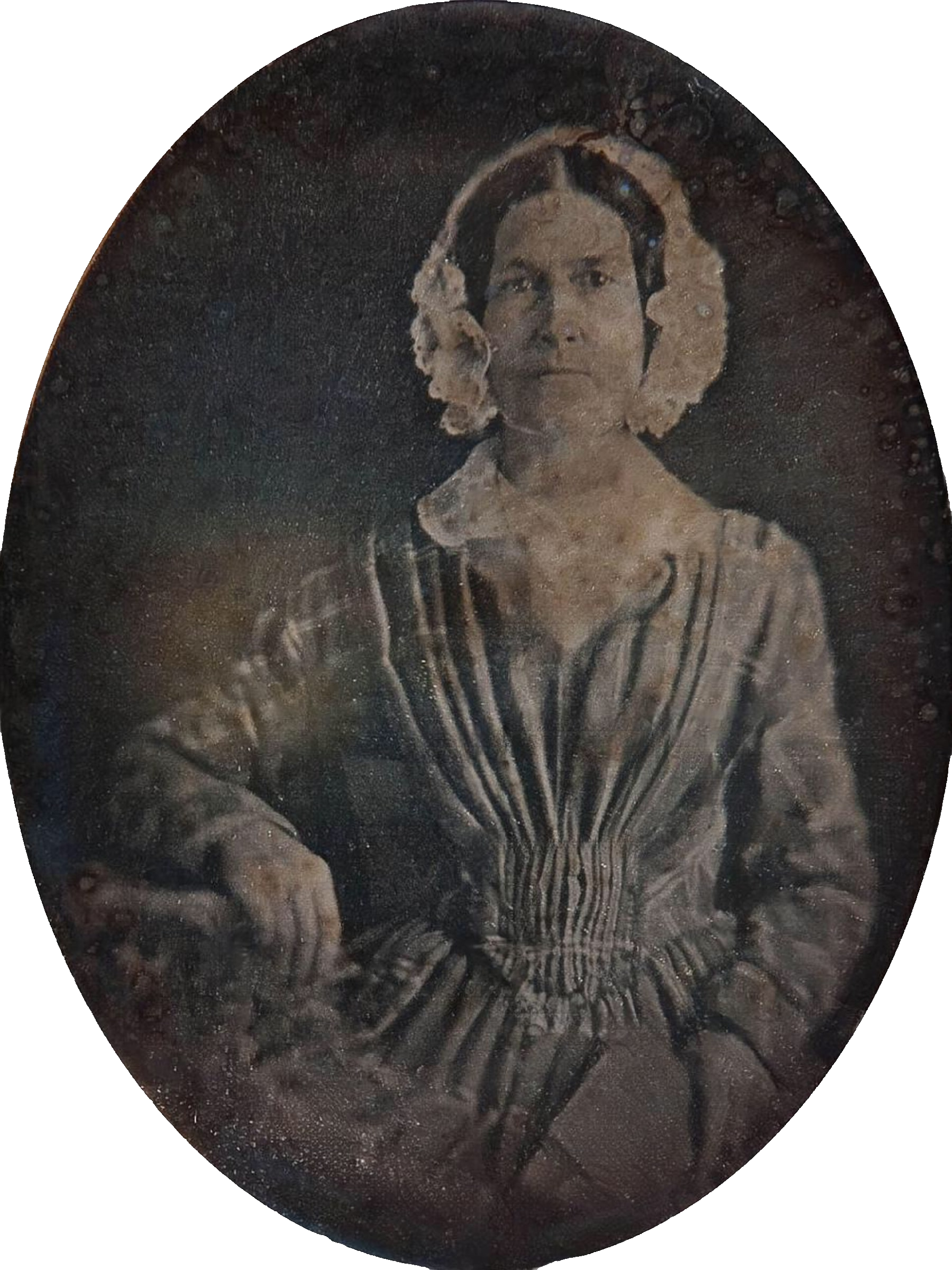
Daguerreotype, c. 1840–1852

Like many first ladies of her generation, Taylor rejected the position's traditional duties. Her experience in high society had long since been overshadowed by frontier life, and she had no desire to fulfill the role of White House hostess. She remained in seclusion on the second floor of the White House, citing her health, limiting her hosting to that of family and friends. She delegated her remaining responsibilities to her daughter Mary Elizabeth Bliss. Very few political visitors were invited to meet Taylor, though she did once meet Daniel Webster. Though Taylor was not active in her husband's administration, she would regularly engage in political discussion with guests or knit silently and listen while others discussed politics. She may have influenced her husband's decision to appoint Reverdy Johnson as Attorney General due to her relationship with his wife.

Taylor's limited public appearances and lack of experience in Washington social life inspired rumors and political attacks, often suggesting that she was unintelligent or unladylike. The Taylors maintained a relationship with their widower son-in-law Jefferson Davis, and his second wife Varina Davis became a close friend of Taylor during her(?) tenure as first lady.

Taylor retained the private aspects of the first lady's duties, serving as head of the White House residence. She managed the White House staff, which included 15 slaves. Slavery had become highly controversial by the time the Taylors entered the White House, and the slaves were typically kept upstairs so as not to draw attention to them. Much of her time in the White House was spent knitting. She also attended St. John's Episcopal Church every day, and she was a member of the American Sunday School Union. She was often accompanied in the White House by her children and grandchildren, who visited regularly. Taylor's tenure as first lady ended with the death of her husband on July 9, 1850.

== Later life and death ==
Though Taylor was invited to stay in the White House as long as necessary, she left the evening of her husband's state funeral, and she left Washington a week later. She stayed with her daughter Ann in Baltimore for three months before taking up residence with her daughter Betty in Pascagoula, Mississippi. She lived away from the public eye for the rest of her life, never talking about the White House. It is believed that she spent her final years teaching Sunday school. Taylor died of a fever on August 14, 1852, and was buried beside her husband at what is now the Zachary Taylor National Cemetery. At the time of her death, she had the shortest post White House life of any first lady at two years and 36 days, but she would only briefly hold this record, as her successor Abigail Fillmore died the following year mere weeks after leaving the White House.

== Legacy ==
Taylor is described as "mysterious" due to her relative obscurity. Many contemporary reports erroneously described her as a heavy pipe smoker, though she detested tobacco. Contemporary biographers of Zachary Taylor during his time as a general gave little acknowledgement of his wife, with one merely portraying her as ill and frail and another neglecting to mention her at all outside of a footnote. Her performance as first lady is regarded poorly by historians, and she is typically placed in the bottom five of first ladies in polling of historians by the Siena Research Institute. None of her letters are known to have survived, and she is regarded as having played no role in her husband's administration.

For many years no portraits or photographs of Taylor could be fully authenticated, and none were known to exist. In portrait galleries of the first ladies, Taylor's portrait was typically substituted with that of her daughter Elizabeth. In 2010 a tinted ambrotype portrait of Taylor surfaced. This particular image seems to have been the model for most depictions of her. For many years, the only known image of Taylor was an engraving issued by the U.S. Government in 1902. Heritage Auctions offered a ninth plate daguerreotype of the First Lady, a Taylor family heirloom, in November 2010, identifying it then as one of only two known photographs. This is the one loaned by her daughter, White House Hostess Betty Taylor Bliss Dandridge, to be used as the model for the engraving.

== See also ==
- Bibliography of Zachary Taylor
- Bibliography of United States presidential spouses and first ladies

Honorary titles
| Preceded by Sarah Polk | First Lady of the United States; 1849–1850 | Succeeded by Abigail Fillmore |
