= General Wahl =

General Wahl may refer to:

- George Douglas Wahl (1895–1981), U.S. Army brigadier general
- Lutz Wahl (1869–1928), U.S. Army major general

== See also ==
- Viktor von Wahl (1840–1915), Baltic German general
- Kurt Wahle (1855–1928), German Imperial Army major general
- General Wall (disambiguation)
