= Robert W. Hunter =

American politician

Member of the Virginia House of Delegates from the Berkeley County, Virginia district
- In office September 7, 1863 – March 15, 1865 Serving with Israel Robinson
- Preceded by: Adam Small (Virginian)
- Succeeded by: n/a

Member of the Virginia House of Delegates from the Frederick County district
- In office January 1, 1874 – November 30, 1875 Serving with James Harrison Williams
- Preceded by: E. M. Tidball
- Succeeded by: John F. Wall

Personal details
- Born: July 12, 1837 Virginia
- Died: April 3, 1916 (aged 78) Washington, D.C.
- Party: Democratic
- Spouse(s): Mary Clifton Harrison (d. 1862); Margaret Stuart (d. 1893); Eliza Selden Washington
- Parent: Edmund P. Hunter (father)
- Education: University of Virginia
- Profession: lawyer, newspaperman

Robert Waterman Hunter (July 12, 1837 – April 3, 1916) was a Virginia newspaper editor and Confederate officer who twice served single terms in the Virginia House of Delegates and became the first Secretary of Virginia Military Records, as well as served as federal Inspector of Public Lands during the first Cleveland administration.

== Early and family life ==
Born on July 12, 1837, in Martinsburg to Martha Crawford Abell Hunter (1812-1890), the wife of Edmund P. Hunter (1809-1854) who was a prominent lawyer in what became the Eastern Panhandle of West Virginia in Robert's lifetime, twice served as one of Berkeley County's delegates in the Virginia House of Delegates and owned the Martinsburg Gazette. Robert was the eldest son in a family of seven children. Although his father died of cholera when Robert was 17, their financial circumstances permitted Robert to attend the University of Virginia. He had two elder sisters, the eldest of whom, Sarah Forrest Hunter, married Peyton Randolph Harrison Jr. (1832-1861), whose sister would become Robert's first wife but die of childbirth complications. The family also included several younger sisters and two younger brothers, David B. Hunter (1843-1864) and John A. Hunter (1845-1921).

Robert W. Hunter would marry three times. His first bride was his brother in law's sister, Mary Clifton Harrison Hunter (1839-1862); both mother and infant son died in 1862. Hunter remarried at war's end (1865) in King George, Virginia, to Margaret Stuart Hunter (1837-1893). They had three daughters and two sons: Julia Calvert Hunter Kennedy (1868-1946), Martha Forrest Hunter Campbell (1869-1939), Caroline Stuart Holliday Hunter (1872-1950), Richard Stuart Hunter (1875-1960) and Edmund Pendleton Hunter (1877-1938). The widower married Eliza Selden Washington on October 29, 1895, in Norfolk, Virginia. She survived him, and they had no children.

== Career ==
By 1860 Hunter both operated and taught at a private academy in Winchester.

=== Confederate service ===
During the American Civil War, many in northwestern Virginia disagreed with Virginia's secession from the Union after the Virginia Secession Convention of 1861, and instead attended the two Wheeling conventions in Wheeling to secede from Virginia, as eventually happened in 1863. However, no delegates from Berkeley County attended either Wheeling assembly, as many in the county either sympathized with the Confederacy (six Confederate and 2 Union companies were recruited from the county) and the county's railroad lines (especially the Baltimore & Ohio Railroad), Chesapeake and Ohio Canal and roads made it of crucial strategic importance (Union forces occupied Martinsburg for 32 months and Confederates for about 16 months).

Meanwhile, Robert W. Hunter enlisted in Company D of the 2nd Virginia Infantry on April 18, 1861, at Martinsburg and received a lieutenant's commission. He was appointed the unit's adjutant on June 17, 1861; the last unit entry that shows him as present was made in November/December 1861. Hunter later served as chief of staff to General John Brown Gordon and rose to the rank of major. His brother-in-law, Peyton R. Harrison, Jr., died at the First Battle of Bull Run in July 1861 (although Hunter survived), and his younger brother David died at the disastrous (for Confederacy) Battle of Cedar Creek in 1864.

Residents of Berkeley County (generally those serving in the Confederate military such as Hunter, since West Virginians as a whole approved statehood despite the Jones-Imboden Raid) elected Hunter and re-elected veteran politician Israel Robinson to represent them in the Virginia House of Delegates in Richmond (though Robinson died during this term and was replaced by fellow Stonewall Brigade officer William B. Colston). Neither Hunter nor Colston resigned his military commission during his part-time legislative service, and Hunter was even selected to carry General Gordon's flag of truce at Appomattox Court House as that Confederate General met Union General Philip Sheridan shortly before General Lee surrendered the Army of Northern Virginia.

=== Post-war career ===
After the war, Hunter either began or resumed his newspaper and legal careers. By 1866, he bought the Winchester Times (which Goldsborough & Clark had established the previous year), and transformed it into a weekly with marked Democratic views. In February 1867 Hunter took Jefferson County native and Confederate 12th Virginia Cavalry veteran Henry D. Beall (1837-1902) as a partner. The partnership continued until 1869, when Beall sold his interest in the newspaper to former Confederate Captain E.G. Hollis and moved to Baltimore, where he worked for the Baltimore Sun for many years. The Winchester Times absorbed the Winchester Sentinel in 1871. Hunter resumed sole ownership of the Winchester Times in 1877, and continued as its editor and publisher until 1883, when he sold to Thomas W. Harrison who took lawyer-publisher Richard Evelyn Byrd Sr. (father of future Senator Harry F. Byrd) as partner. By 1899 the Times had become the weekly edition of the Winchester Evening Star, but its days were numbered. The weekly's last edition was published on March 29, 1905.

Hunter was also an active member of the Turner Ashby Camp No. 22 of Confederate Veterans in Winchester. Virginia did not recognize the creation of the state of West Virginia until long after the American Civil War ended. In 1871 it lost Virginia v. West Virginia, a lawsuit seeking the return of Berkeley and neighboring Jefferson County in the U.S. Supreme Court; litigation seeking reimbursement for public improvements in what had become West Virginia would continue past 1900. Meanwhile, in 1874, Frederick County voters elected Hunter to serve as one of their two delegates, alongside veteran politician John F. Wall, but the following year neither won re-election. During the first term of President Grover Cleveland, a fellow Democrat, Hunter became the federal Inspector of Public Lands. He continued to live in Winchester in 1880, and listed his occupation on that year's census as "editor of newspaper". However, by 1900 he, his third wife and youngest son E. P. Hunter (whose occupation was listed as "clerk"), lived in Alexandria, Virginia, with easy train access to both Washington and Richmond.

Meanwhile, on March 13, 1884, Virginia's General Assembly passed an act to compile a roster of Virginians who served in the Confederate military, but the project was neither funded, nor completed, so additional legislation was passed on January 25, 1898 and March 6, 1900 directing local Commissioners of Revenue (in each of Virginia's counties) to compile such lists. However, not until after the U.S. Congress passed an act on February 25, 1903, which provided for assembling of muster rolls for all Union and Confederate soldiers, did Virginia create the Office of the Secretary of Virginia Military Records on March 7, 1904, to assist the Secretary of War and the U.S. War Department in compiling a complete roster of Confederate soldiers from Virginia. Governor Andrew J. Montague appointed Hunter the first Secretary of Virginia Military Records, upon the recommendation of the Grand Commander of the Grand Camp of Confederate Veterans, Hunter also wrote a column "Our Confederate" in the Richmond Times-Dispatch from 1904 until 1909. The Virginia General Assembly passed legislation expanding the small office and reappointing Hunter as secretary (with a salary) on February 20, 1906 and again on March 9, 1908. Hunter submitted a report concerning his office's accomplishments to Governor Claude A. Swanson in 1909. Joseph V. Bidgood succeeded him in 1910.

== Death and legacy ==
Hunter died in Washington, D.C., on April 3, 1916, survived by his third wife, children and grandchildren. He is buried at Mount Hebron Cemetery in Winchester, Virginia. The Department of Military Records was ultimately closed and its archival responsibilities transferred to the Library of Virginia.
