= Edmund P. Hunter =

American politician

Member of the Virginia House of Delegates from the Berkeley County district
- In office December 1, 1834 – December 4, 1836 Serving with Edward Colston; Levi Henshaw
- Preceded by: Charles J. Faulkner
- Succeeded by: Robert V. Snodgrass
- In office December 2, 1839 – November 30, 1840 Serving with Jacob Myers
- Preceded by: Tillotson Fryatt
- Succeeded by: Tillotson Fryatt
- In office December 6, 1841 – December 4, 1842 Serving with James M. Newkirk
- Preceded by: Tillotson Fryatt
- Succeeded by: William T. Snodgrass

Personal details
- Born: March 25, 1809 Martinsburg, Virginia, U.S.
- Died: September 9, 1854 (aged 45) Martinsburg, Virginia, U.S.
- Party: Whig
- Spouse: Martha Crawford Abell
- Relations: Andrew Hunter (brother)
- Children: 8, including Robert
- Education: Washington and Jefferson College
- Profession: Lawyer, newspaper editor

Military service
- Allegiance: United States
- Branch/service: Virginia militia
- Rank: colonel

Edmund Pendleton Hunter (March 25, 1809 – September 9, 1854) was a Virginia lawyer, newspaper editor, soldier, slaveowner and politician who served four terms in the Virginia House of Delegates as a Whig.

== Early and family life ==
Born on March 25, 1809, in the then-small town of Martinsburg to Elizabeth Pendleton (1774-1825) and her husband Col. David Hunter (1761-1829), who had emigrated across the Potomac River from York County, Pennsylvania and became the Berkeley County clerk, as well as led its militia. The family included three elder brothers: Philip Pendleton Hunter (1800-1855; who moved to Carmi, Illinois), Dr. David Hunter (b. 1802), Andrew Hunter (1804-1888) and Rev. Moses Hoge Hunter (1814-1899), as well as six sisters.

After a private education in Martinsburg, Hunter graduated from Jefferson College in Washington, Pennsylvania, then read law.

Edmund P. Hunter married Martha Crawford Abell (1812-1890) in Jefferson, Alabama on August 8, 1832. She would bear eight children (all but one daughter surviving to adulthood) and survive him. By 1850, he owned five enslaved people,

== Career ==
Admitted to the Berkeley County, Virginia bar in 1831, Hunter became a prominent lawyer in Martinsburg, as well as the county prosecutor after the resignation of Elisha Boyd from that post in 1838 (after four decades). Hunter attended the "Young Men's Convention" in Washington, D.C. in May 1832 and heard leading Whig Henry Clay speak, in including in support of internal improvements such as the Chesapeake and Ohio Canal which reached Cumberland, Maryland not terribly far from Martinsburg, as well as the Baltimore and Ohio Railroad, which had some difficulty reaching Martinsburg due to the opposition of Virginia politicians who convinced the Virginia General Assembly to authorize only routes south of Kanawha.

Hunter also established and published the Martinsburg Gazette beginning circa 1832, which in addition to advocating for internal improvements, also published essays and sketches by "Porte Crayon", the pen name of the son of Col. Hunter's successor as county clerk, Col. John Strother. Porte Crayon lived at Berkeley Springs in Berkeley County during summers and Martinsburg during winters.

Berkeley County's voters elected E.P. Hunter as one of their delegates to the Virginia House of Delegates in 1834, and Hunter won re-election once before losing his second bid for re-election. He would subsequently win single terms in 1839 (during which he helped arrange funding in the Virginia legislature for a Baltimore and Ohio Railroad route through Martinsburg, the Maryland legislature offering a premium for a more technically difficult route on the opposite bank of the Potomac River) and 1841, the year the B&O reached Martinsburg after constructing a bridge at Harpers Ferry.

Hunter was also a Mason, active in the local Episcopal Church, and received the honorific "Colonel" for leading the 67th regiment of Virginia Militia.

== Death and legacy ==
Hunter died during a cholera epidemic in Martinsburg on September 4, 1854. Two of his sons served in the Confederate States Army during the American Civil War: David B. Hunter died in 1864 but his elder brother Robert W. Hunter not only survived, but followed his father's footsteps in editing a newspaper (in Winchester) as well as having a legal practice and serving in the Virginia House of Delegates (but as a Democrat, the Whig party having imploded not long after this Hunter's death) and later became Virginia's first secretary of Military Records. His brother Andrew Hunter was one of Virginia's prosecutors of John Brown (abolitionist) for treason in 1859 and after the American Civil War, one of the lawyers who unsuccessfully argued in the United States Supreme Court on Virginia's behalf in 1871 seeking to have Berkeley County and neighboring Jefferson County returned to Virginia. Their youngest brother, Rev. Moses Hoge Hunter (1814-1899) served as chaplain of the 3rd Pennsylvania cavalry during that war, and would later edit the memoirs of Union General David Hunter (particularly despised by Confederate sympathizers in western Virginia).
