= William Wallace Smith Bliss =

American army officer and mathematician

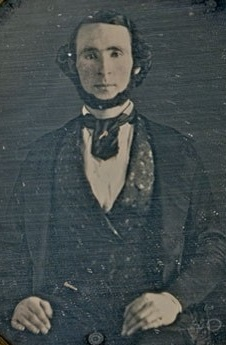
- Daguerreotype by unknown photographer, c. 1848

Private Secretary to the President
- In office March 4, 1849 – July 9, 1850
- President: Zachary Taylor
- Preceded by: Joseph Knox Walker
- Succeeded by: Millard Powers Fillmore

Personal details
- Born: August 17, 1815 Whitehall, New York
- Died: August 5, 1853 (aged 37) Pascagoula, Mississippi
- Spouse: Mary Elizabeth Taylor (m. 1848)

William Wallace Smith Bliss (August 17, 1815 – August 5, 1853) was a United States Army officer, mathematics professor, and linguist.

Bliss taught mathematics at West Point, and served as a line officer throughout his military career.

Gifted at languages, he was able to read thirteen and could speak a number of them fluently. When he became interested in the various Native American tribes, Bliss learned a number of their tongues and studied their cultures. He was a member of the Royal Society of Northern Antiquaries of Copenhagen, Denmark, and an Honorary Member of the American Ethnological Society.

Bliss was an aid to then-General Zachary Taylor in Texas from 1845 to 1848, including the duration of the Mexican-American War. In December 1848 he married Mary Elizabeth Taylor, then President-elect Taylor's youngest daughter. Bliss would go on leave from the Army and serve as Taylor's presidential secretary until Taylor's untimely death in 1850. Resuming his duties, Bliss contracted yellow fever in New Orleans in 1853 and died in Mississippi at the age of 37.

== Early life ==
Bliss was born in Whitehall, New York, the son of Captain John Bliss (of Lebanon, New Hampshire) and Olive Hall Simonds (of Todd County, Kentucky).

== Career ==
=== Military ===
Bliss entered the United States Military Academy at West Point, New York, on September 1, 1829, at the age of 14. He showed very great skills in mathematics, and graduated July 1, 1833, at age 17, and was commissioned as a second lieutenant in the 4th Infantry Regiment. He had requested an assignment in that branch.

He served in the Fort Mitchell army garrison in Alabama from 1833 to 1834. During 1835 he was involved in operations against the Cherokee during Indian Removal in the Southeast, which forced most of them onto Indian Territory west of the Mississippi River.

On October 2, 1834, the 19 year-old Bliss began as an assistant professor of mathematics at West Point, a position he held until January 4, 1840. Promoted to captain, he served as chief of staff to Brigadier General Walker Keith Armistead, the commanding general in the Seminole Wars, from 1840 until 1841. From 1841 until 1845 he served as a staff officer at Fort Smith, Arkansas, and at Fort Jesup, Louisiana.

Also in 1845, Bliss took part in the United States military occupation of the Republic of Texas prior to its late December annexation. Between April 1846 and November 1847 he took part in the Mexican War, including fighting in the battles of Palo Alto, Resaca de la Palma and Buena Vista. He was brevetted to major in May 1846, and again to lieutenant colonel in February 1847, for gallant and meritorious service.

During his entire service in Texas and Mexico, he served as chief of staff to Major General Zachary Taylor. Bliss was noted for his efficiency and skills as a high-level aide. His writing was simple, elegant, vigorous, and picturesque. He was cheerful and popular with the public.

=== Political ===
President-elect Zachary Taylor appointed Bliss his Private Secretary, who took leave from the Army to fill his new role.

The President's wife took no part in formal social events, and delegated the First Lady's social role to the Taylor's daughter Mary Elizabeth (Bliss), who assumed the role of White House hostess at the age of 22. The popular young Blisses seemed destined to become powerful figures in Washington.

The president died suddenly in July 1850. Bliss and his wife Mary accompanied her mother to Pascagoula, Mississippi. She died there in 1852, at the home of another daughter.

Bliss resumed his military service, and was assigned as Adjutant-General of the Western Division of the Army. He died of illness in 1853.

== Intellectual pursuits ==
Bliss had a talent for languages, and was fluent in at least thirteen. George Perkins Marsh, the philologist, called Bliss was the best linguist in America.

Bliss received the honorary degree of Master of Arts from Dartmouth College, New Hampshire, in 1849. He was a member of the Royal Society of Northern Antiquaries of Copenhagen, Denmark, and an Honorary Member of the American Ethnological Society.

== Personal life ==
Bliss married President-elect Zachary Taylor's youngest daughter, Mary Elizabeth (1824–1909), on December 5, 1848, at Baton Rouge, Louisiana.

== Death ==
Gravestone of William Bliss, Fort Bliss National Cemetery

Following a summer visit to New Orleans on behalf of University of Louisiana, Bliss contracted yellow fever. He died in Pascagoula, Mississippi a on August 5, 1853, at the age of 37. He was buried at Girod Street Cemetery (defunct), New Orleans. A century later, his remains were moved to Fort Bliss National Cemetery in Texas.

== Legacy and honors ==
- In 1849, the State of New York presented Bliss with a Gold Medal for his bravery in the Mexican–American War, at Palo Alto, Resaca de la Palma, Monterrey, and Buena Vista.
- On March 8, 1854, the U.S. Army Post at El Paso, Texas, was renamed Fort Bliss in his honor.
- A 20 ft (6.1 m) tall memorial made of Italian marble was erected in his honor in the Girod Street Cemetery, New Orleans. It noted he was "a finished scholar, an accomplished gentleman and a gallant soldier." In 1955, the cemetery was condemned for new construction in the Central Business District. When his remains were removed to the Fort Bliss National Cemetery, the monument was relocated to Fort Bliss as the centerpiece of LTC William W. S. Bliss Parade Field, near Hinman Hall.
