= Nimrod Whitacre =

American politician (1822–1892)

Member of the Virginia House of Delegates from the Frederick County district
- In office December 5, 1877 – December 2, 1879 Serving with Thomas T. Fauntleroy
- Preceded by: John F. Wall
- Succeeded by: Edmund P. Dandridge

Personal details
- Born: January 1822 Frederick County, Virginia, U.S.
- Died: December 12, 1892 (aged 70)
- Party: Conservative
- Spouse: Elizabeth A. Mauzy (m. 1844; died 1886)
- Children: 8
- Occupation: Politician; farmer

Nimrod Whitacre (January 1822 – December 12, 1892) was an American politician from Virginia. He served in the Virginia House of Delegates from 1877 to 1879.

== Early life ==
Nimrod Whitacre was born in January 1822 near Back Creek in Frederick County, Virginia to Rachael (née Wilson) and George Whitacre.

== Career ==
Whitacre was affiliated with the Conservative Party. He served in the Virginia House of Delegates, representing Frederick County from 1877 to 1879. He also served as justice of the peace for about 30 years. He worked as a farmer and owned real estate.

== Personal life ==
Whitacre married Elizabeth A. Mauzy, daughter of Peter Mauzy, of Hampshire County, Virginia, in October 1844. Following his marriage, he lived two years in Hampshire County. In 1846, they moved to a home near the Whitacre post office in Frederick County. The couple had eight children, Harrison P., Lamarian C., James P., George S., William Clark, Turner A., Robert E. L. and Herbert D. His wife died in 1886. Whitacre was a member of the Disciples Church.

Whitacre died on December 12, 1892.
