= Thomas T. Fauntleroy (soldier) =

American military figure and politician

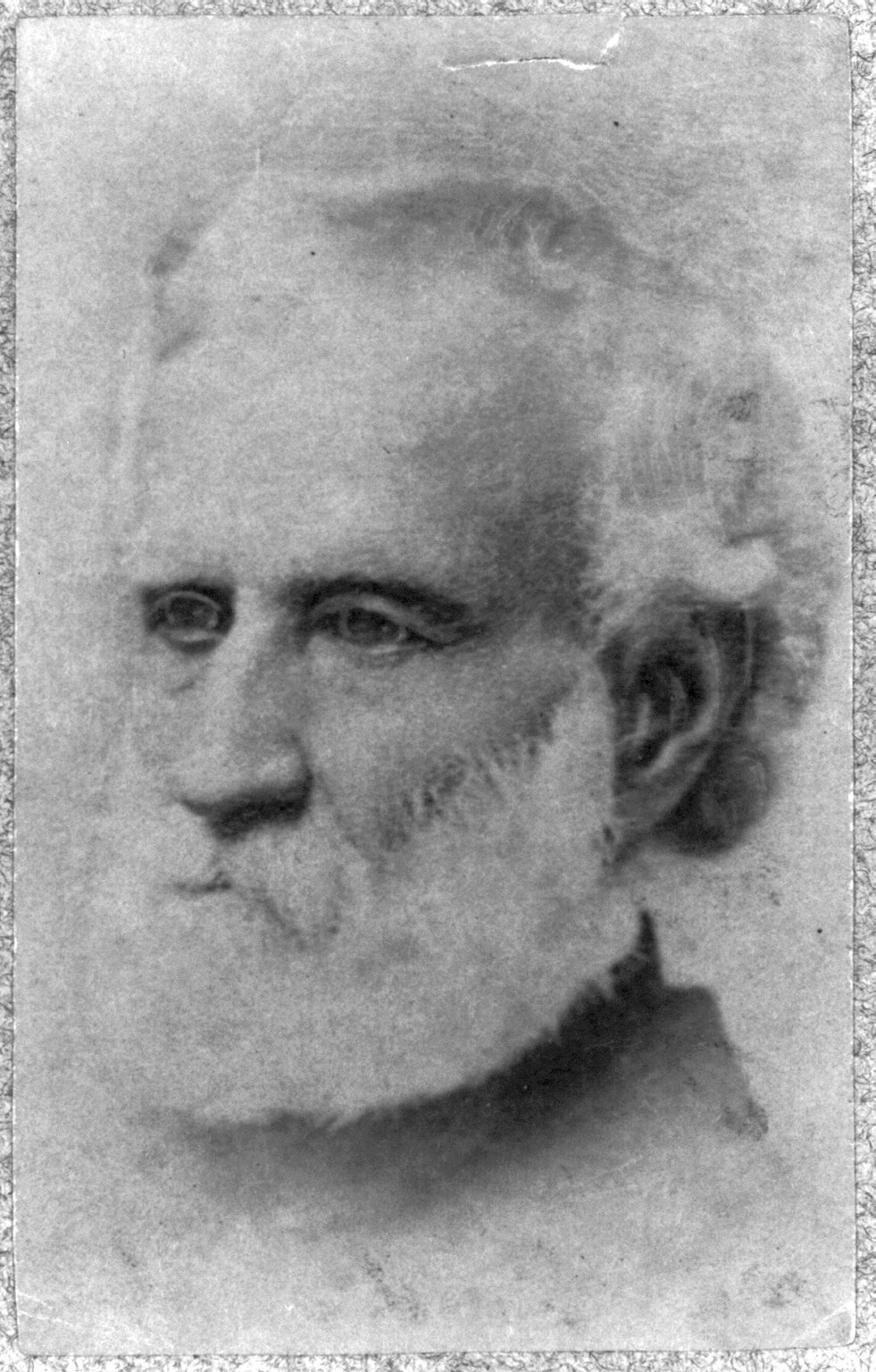

Member of the Virginia House of Delegates from the Fauquier County district
- In office December 1, 1823 – November 28, 1824 Serving with John Marshall Jr.
- Preceded by: Eppa Hunton
- Succeeded by: John Robert Wallace

Personal details
- Born: October 6, 1796 Richmond County, Virginia, U.S.
- Died: September 12, 1883 (aged 86) Leesburg, Virginia, U.S.

Military service
- Allegiance: United States; Virginia
- Branch/service: United States Army; Provisional Army of Virginia
- Years of service: 1812–1814, 1836–1861; 1861
- Rank: Colonel (USA); Brigadier General (Virginia)
- Commands: 1st U.S. Dragoons; Department of New Mexico
- Battles/wars: War of 1812; Second Seminole War; Mexican–American War; Indian Wars; American Civil War

Thomas Turner Fauntleroy (October 6, 1796 – September 12, 1883) was a Virginia lawyer, state legislator from Fauquier, Regular Army officer, slaver, and briefly a Virginia military officer at the beginning of the American Civil War who refused a commission as brigadier general in the Confederate States Army.

== Early life and career ==
Fauntleroy was born in Clarke County, Virginia to Joseph Fauntleroy (of Richmond County, Virginia) and his wife Elizabeth ("Betsy") Fouchee Fauntleroy (of Richmond, Virginia).

Although only 17 years old, he was commissioned a lieutenant in the U.S. Army during the War of 1812.

After the war, Fauntleroy studied law in Winchester, Virginia, then practiced law in Warrenton, Virginia. He married Ann Magdelin Magill, daughter of Col. Magill of Winchester. They had two daughters and two sons who would survive the American Civil War: Thomas Turner Fauntleroy Jr. (1823–1906), Mary Thurston Fauntleroy Barnes (1824–1912), Katherine Knox Fauntlerosy Whittlesey (1834–1906), and Archibald Magil Fauntleroy (1836–1886). His firstborn son, C.N. Fauntleroy, joined the Confederate Navy.

He was elected to the Virginia House of Delegates from Fauquier County, Virginia in 1823 for a single term, serving alongside John Marshall Jr., who had likewise ousted an incumbent delegate but who would continue to serve in the next session.

== Regular U.S. Army service ==
Commissioned a major of dragoons on June 8, 1836, Fautleroy served in the Second Seminole War. Detached from Major General Zachary Taylor's main force in 1835, he held native Americans in check on the Texas frontier. He was promoted to lieutenant colonel, Second Regiment of Dragoons, on June 30, 1846, and ordered to join General Taylor's force during the Mexican–American War at the Rio Grande. Later, he commanded the cavalry of Major General Winfield Scott's army in the campaign to capture Mexico City.

In 1849 he assumed command of the First Regiment of Dragoons, commanding troops on frontier duty in Texas. His next assignment commanded the Post at Mission San Diego de Alcalá at San Diego, which led to his promotion to colonel on July 25, 1850. He then commanded Fort Vancouver in Oregon Territory. During this time, three of his brothers died: Robert Henry Fauntleroy in Galveston Texas in 1849, Leroy D. Fauntleroy in Pensacola, Florida in 1853 and William M. Fauntleroy in Adams County, Mississippi in 1854.

During the winter of 1854–1855, Col. Fauntleroy campaigned against the hostile Utes in the Rocky Mountains and in 1858 made another mid-winter campaign against the Apache in New Mexico. He also led several expeditions against the Apaches, accompanied by scout Kit Carson. From 1859–1861 Col. Fauntleroy commanded the Department of New Mexico.

== American Civil War ==
While Col. Fauntleroy fought in the West, his son and namesake had become a lawyer and followed his father's example by winning election to the Virginia House of Delegates, albeit for Frederick County. After the Battle of Fort Sumter that began the American Civil War and Virginia's secession in April 1861, Fauntleroy resigned his U.S. Army commission in May 1861 and returned to his native Commonwealth. Governor of Virginia John Letcher appointed Fauntleroy as brigadier general of the Provisional Army of Virginia. However, by the following month, the Confederate States Army had been organized and the Provisional Army of Virginia was merged into it. Fauntleroy refused to accept a CSA commission, despite General Samuel Cooper offering such on July 9, 1861. He was relieved of that rank on his request on August 25, 1861, having never held Confederate rank.

== Postwar ==
After the war, the retired Fauntleroy lived in Opequon, Virginia near Winchester with his son Thomas' family.

Fauntleroy's eldest son, C. M. Fauntleroy was a U.S. Navy officer who joined the Confederate Navy and commanded the CSS Rappahannock. His second son, also named Thomas T. Fauntleroy, became a Virginia lawyer and politician and after the war a judge of the Virginia Supreme Court of Appeals. Another son Archibald Magill Fauntleroy became a surgeon in the Confederate army and later a physician. A daughter, Mary Thurston Fauntleroy, married Surgeon General of the United States Army Joseph Barnes.

Although Fauntleroy lived in Winchester with his son Thomas' family in 1880, he died in Leesburg, Virginia on September 12, 1883, and was buried at Mount Hebron Cemetery in Winchester.
