= Zachary Taylor National Cemetery =

Veterans cemetery in Jefferson County, Kentucky

Coordinates: 38°16′41″N 85°38′37″W

- U.S. National Register of Historic Places
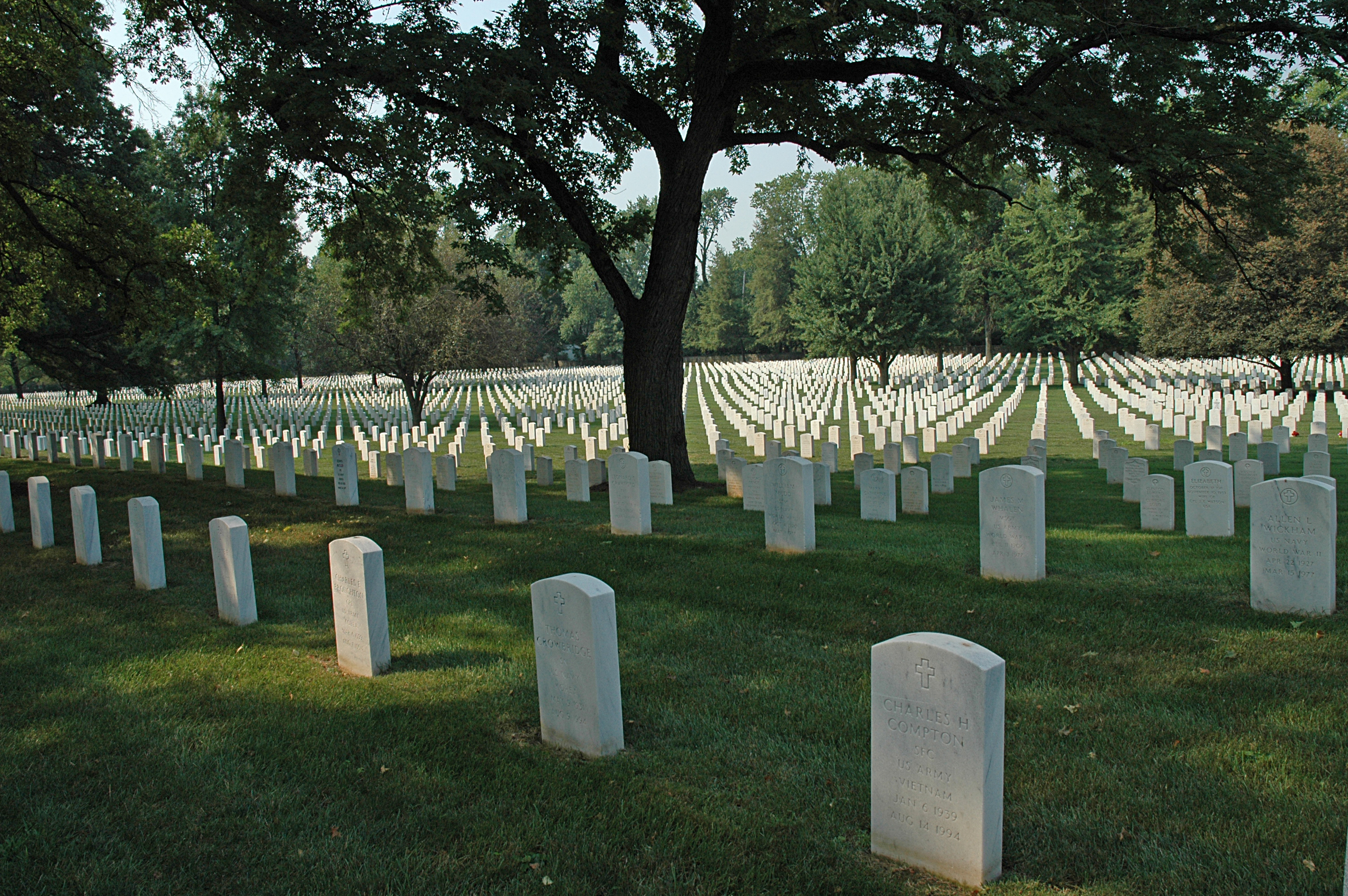

- Location within Kentucky
- Location: Louisville, Kentucky, US
- Built: 1926
- MPS: Jefferson County MRA
- NRHP reference No.: 83003733
- Added to NRHP: November 3, 1983

Zachary Taylor National Cemetery is a United States National Cemetery located at 4701 Brownsboro Road (US-42), in Louisville, Kentucky. It is named for Zachary Taylor, the 12th president of the United States, who is buried there with his wife, Margaret Mackall Smith Taylor. Zachary Taylor National Cemetery was listed in the National Register of Historic Places on November 3, 1983. As of 2014, the cemetery has over 14,000 interments and is one of seven national cemeteries in the Commonwealth of Kentucky, and one of 112 in the United States. Those buried at the national cemetery served in six wars: Spanish–American War, World War I, World War II, Korean War, Vietnam War, and the Persian Gulf War.

The cemetery began as the Taylor family cemetery and holds the graves of the president's parents, Richard Taylor, a colonel in the American Revolutionary War, and Sarah Strother Taylor, and other family members.

== History ==
The land which became Zachary Taylor National Cemetery was part of Richard Taylor's 400-acre (160 ha) estate, known as Springfield, given to him in gratitude for his service in the American Revolutionary War. The house in which the family lived for most of their time in Louisville is still nearby, and is called the Zachary Taylor House.

On November 1, 1850, Zachary Taylor was buried in his family's burial ground. His remains were moved there from the Congressional Cemetery in Washington, D.C. where he was interred temporarily from July 13 to October 25, 1850.

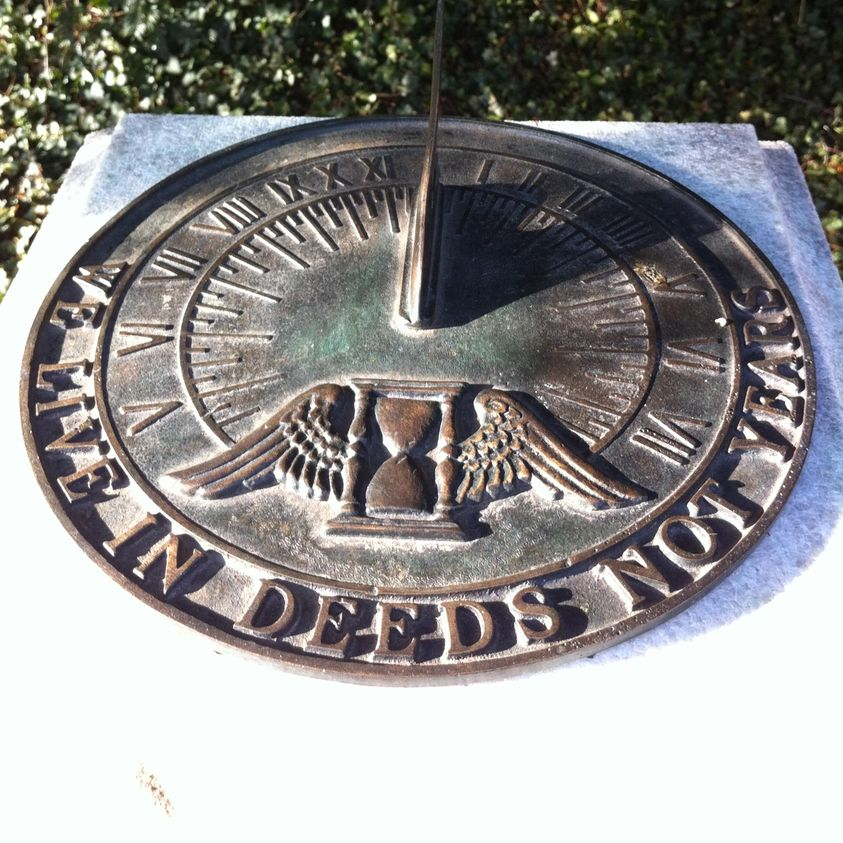
Winged hourglass on sundial at Taylor's grave site, with inscription, "We live in deeds not years"

In 1883, the commonwealth of Kentucky placed a fifty-foot monument, topped by a life-sized statue of Zachary Taylor, near his grave. In 1930, a sundial was added.

The Taylor family in the 1920s initiated the effort to turn the Taylor burial grounds into a national cemetery. The commonwealth of Kentucky donated two adjacent parcels of land for the project, turning the half-acre Taylor family cemetery into 16 acres (6.5 ha). However, the Army judge advocate general ruled against acquiring the Taylor cemetery. When the national cemetery was created, the federal government constructed a new mausoleum for Zachary Taylor, made of limestone with a granite base and a marble interior. The mausoleum and adjacent Taylor family graves lie within the boundaries of the national cemetery, but are not owned by the United States government. However, the National Cemetery Administration maintains the Taylor graves as it does the rest of the national cemetery.

There have been several attempts to increase the size of the cemetery, but each time local residents stopped the growth.

The National Cemetery made the national news on June 17, 1991, when Zachary Taylor's remains were exhumed to determine if the real cause of death was arsenic poisoning and not an intestinal ailment as previously thought.

"A team of Kentucky medical examiners concluded yesterday that Taylor was not poisoned with arsenic or other compounds ... laying to rest speculation that he was the first president assassinated." The article title is misleading, as the body was too decomposed to determine what Taylor died of, but there was nonetheless no sign of poisoning.

== Today ==
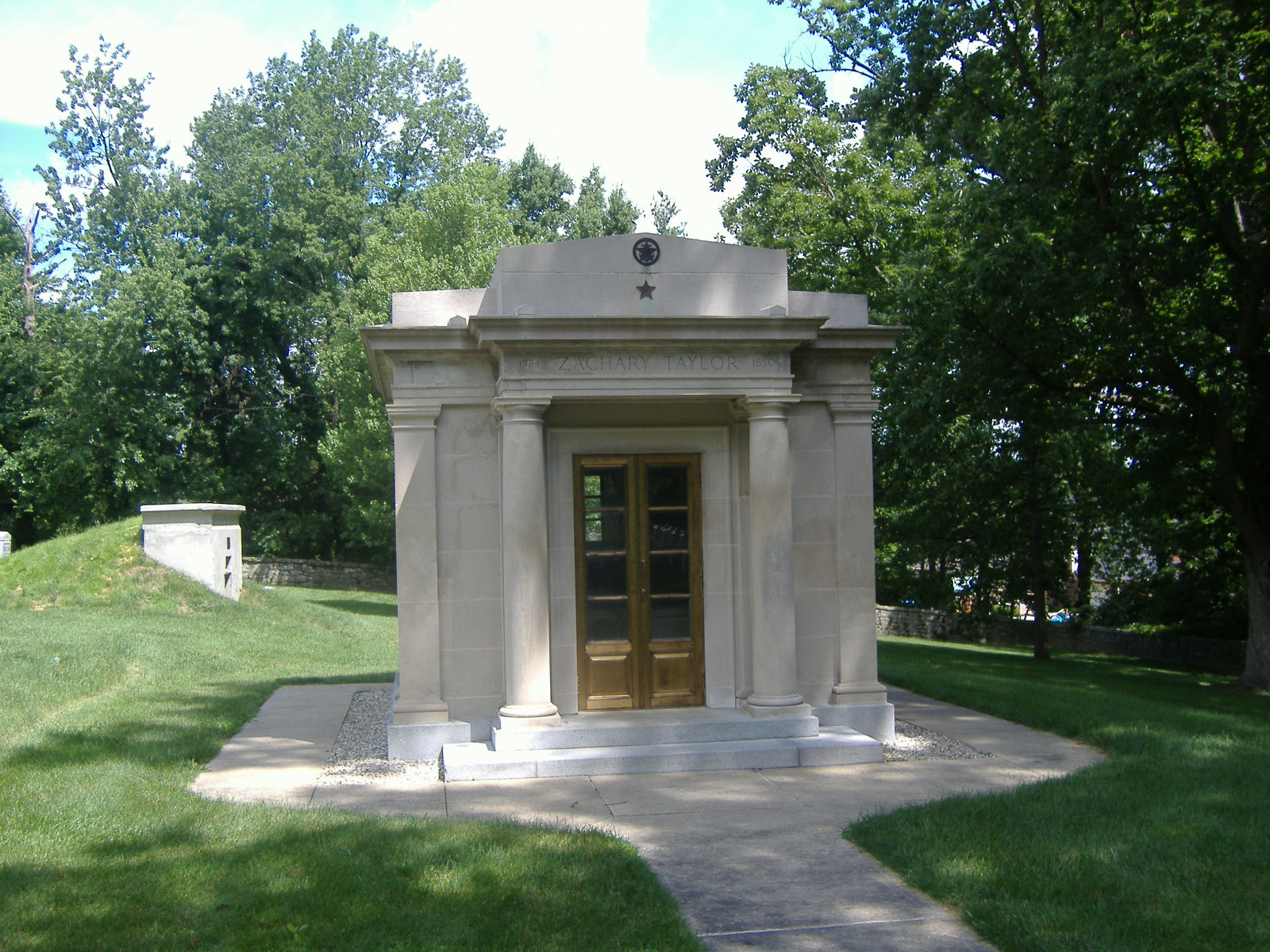
Zachary Taylor's mausoleum

The cemetery is currently closed to new interments. However, space may be available in the same grave site for eligible family members. It is administered by the National Cemetery Administration, a division of the Department of Veterans Affairs.

The cemetery is the burial site of one Medal of Honor recipient, Sergeant John C. Squires (World War II), United States Army. Also, United States Air Force Lieutenant General Roscoe Charles Wilson is buried there.

The Taylor family section is at the rear of the national cemetery. The vault in which Zachary Taylor was first buried still stands near the 1926 mausoleum. Soldiers from Fort Knox engage in a wreath-laying ceremony every November 24, the anniversary of Zachary Taylor's birth.

The cemetery also contains the war graves of three British Army soldiers who died on the same day (March 18, 1944) in World War II.

== See also ==
- Cave Hill National Cemetery, the other National Cemetery in Louisville
- List of attractions and events in the Louisville metropolitan area
- List of burial places of presidents and vice presidents of the United States
