= Mary Elizabeth Bliss =

Daughter of US President Zachary Taylor

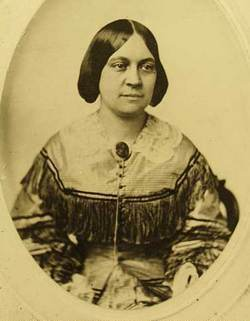
- Born: Mary Elizabeth Taylor; April 20, 1824; Louisville, Kentucky, U.S.
- Died: July 25, 1909 (aged 85); Winchester, Virginia, U.S.
- Spouses: William Wallace Smith Bliss (m. 1848; died 1853) Philip Pendleton Dandridge (m. 1858; died 1881)
- Parent(s): Zachary Taylor; Margaret Smith

Mary Elizabeth "Betty" Bliss Dandridge (née Taylor; April 20, 1824 – July 25, 1909) was the youngest of the three surviving daughters of President Zachary Taylor and Margaret Smith.

In 1848, after her father was elected president, Mary Elizabeth married William Wallace Smith Bliss, an army officer who had served with her father. Taylor appointed William Bliss as Presidential Secretary. At the age of 24, Mary Elizabeth Bliss served as First Lady during her father's presidency, as her mother declined the social role.

== Early life and education ==
Betty Taylor was born the youngest of five daughters (two of whom died before she was born) of Peggy and Zachary Taylor in Louisville, Kentucky, then on the frontier. She also had a younger brother, Dick Taylor. She and her siblings grew up alternately at their plantation in Louisville and U.S. Army forts, where her father, a career Army officer, was often in command. Her mother mostly taught the children at home, sometimes with the help of tutors or young army officers. In the late 1820s, the family moved to a plantation near Baton Rouge, as her father was purchasing land in the area.

In the early 1830s, the family was with Taylor at Fort Crawford as he waged the Black Hawk War. Later they returned to Baton Rouge, when he went to territorial Florida for the Second Seminole War and then to Texas.

== Marriage and political career ==
On December 5, 1848, Betty married William Wallace Smith Bliss, an army officer who had served with her father.

Zachary Taylor was elected to the presidency in 1848, and was inaugurated in 1849. He appointed William Bliss as his Presidential Secretary.

As President Taylor's wife declined the role, Betty Bliss – addressed as "Miss Betty" – served as First Lady for her father during official White House functions. She and her husband were excited about their roles in Washington, D.C.

In many respects, it was Betty Bliss who assumed responsibility for the family's primary interaction with the general public. The President's daughter was the public hostess of the Administration. At the Inaugural Ball, following the Russian Minister's wife in red silk and diamonds, "Miss Betty" appeared in a simple white dress with a white flower in her hair, and her naturalness became her trademark. She presided over all public functions in the White House as the official hostess of the Taylor Administration. The public face of the Taylor women duo, Betty Bliss even had a popular dance song written in her honor.

On July 9, 1850, the Taylor presidency ended prematurely with Zachary Taylor's death. Betty and her husband accompanied her widowed mother Peggy Taylor to Pascagoula, Mississippi, where Mrs. Taylor lived with another married daughter until her death two years later. The following year, William Bliss died of yellow fever contracted in New Orleans, leaving Mrs. Bliss a widow at 29.

On February 11, 1858, Betty married again, to Philip Pendleton Dandridge (1817–1881). She died on July 25, 1909, at 85, and was buried at Mount Hebron Cemetery in Winchester, Virginia. She was the last surviving child of Zachary Taylor.
