= Sarah Knox Davis =

Daughter of Zachary Taylor and first wife of Jefferson Davis

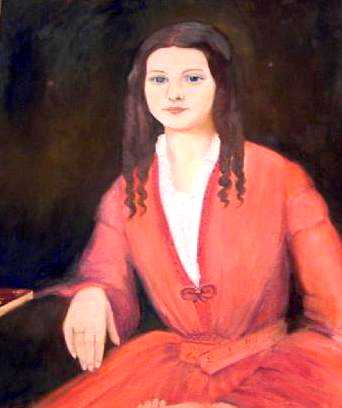
- Sarah Knox Taylor, age 16
- Born: Sarah Knox Taylor; March 6, 1814; Fort Knox II, Vincennes, Indiana, U.S.
- Died: September 15, 1835 (aged 21); St. Francisville, Louisiana, U.S.
- Cause of death: Malaria or yellow fever
- Resting place: Locust Grove State Historic Site
- Other name: Knoxie
- Spouse: Jefferson Davis (m. 1835)
- Parent(s): Zachary Taylor; Margaret Smith

Sarah Knox Davis (née Taylor; March 6, 1814 – September 15, 1835) was the daughter of the 12th U.S. president Zachary Taylor and part of the notable Lee family. She met future Confederate president Jefferson Davis (1808–1889) when living with her father and family at Fort Crawford during the Black Hawk War in 1832. They married in 1835 and she died three months later of malaria.

== Marriage and death ==
Zachary Taylor and his wife, Margaret, had three surviving daughters and one son. Sarah Knox Taylor was their second child and spent some years growing up on military installations. Her father became a general and commanded forts; her mother provided most of her education. Sarah was given the nickname "Knoxie," which originated from her middle name and from Fort Knox II in Vincennes, Indiana, where she was born. In the early 1830s, her father commanded Fort Crawford at Prairie du Chien, Wisconsin, and was involved in waging the Black Hawk War. His wife and children lived there with him.

At age 17, Sarah fell in love with Jefferson Davis, (1808–1889), a recent graduate of the United States Military Academy, and a newly commissioned lieutenant in the United States Army, who was second to General Taylor at the fort. Davis was transferred to St. Louis in 1833, yet managed to keep in contact with the woman whom he wished to marry. Zachary Taylor admired Davis for his soldiering skills but opposed the romantic match. The Taylors' older daughter had already married Army surgeon Robert Crooke Wood, and they were raising three young children in a desolate frontier outpost. Together with their own experience, the Taylors felt that the military life was too hard and did not want Sarah to be an Army wife.

Following discussions with his older brother Joseph Emory Davis, Jefferson decided to resign from the Army so that he could marry Sarah. He returned to Mississippi to develop his Brierfield Plantation next to his brother's Hurricane Plantation. Joseph gave Jefferson the land, called Brierfield because it was largely covered with brush and briers.

After Sarah turned 21, she married Davis on June 17, 1835, at the home of her aunt, near Louisville, Kentucky. Both of the newlyweds contracted either malaria or yellow fever on a summer visit to Davis's sister, Anna Davis Smith, in St. Francisville, Louisiana. Sarah Taylor Davis died of the tropical illness just three months into her marriage to Jefferson Davis, while staying in her sister-in-law's home, Locust Grove Plantation. Her husband nearly died as well. The young Mrs. Davis was laid to rest near other members of Jefferson Davis's family, in the cemetery located on the site of the (former) Locust Grove Plantation. The cemetery has been preserved by the state of Louisiana and is now known as the Locust Grove State Historic Site.

== Posthumous ==
Jefferson Davis was devastated by the death of his young wife, as were her parents. Her death caused years of ill will between Davis and Zachary Taylor; Taylor and his wife felt that Davis should have known better than to go to St. Francisville in the "fever season". The men met by chance in 1845 on a Mississippi steamboat and achieved some reconciliation.

After recovering from malaria, seeking respite from the loss of his wife, Davis sailed to Havana, and then to New York City. In 1836, he returned to his Brierfield Plantation in Warren County, Mississippi, to take up cotton cultivation. After being reclusive for years, he gradually became active in politics. He remarried in 1845 and had six children. He served in Congress and was elected as President of the Confederate States of America, after secession in 1861.

When Jefferson Davis married Varina Banks Howell on February 26, 1845, he insisted that the newlywed couple visit Sarah's grave during their honeymoon.

Davis served as Colonel under the command of General Zachary Taylor in the 1847 Battle of Buena Vista during the Mexican–American War. Davis fought bravely during the battle but was shot in the foot, necessitating his removal to safety by Robert H. Chilton. In recognition of Davis's bravery and initiative, Taylor is reputed to have said, "My daughter, sir, was a better judge of men than I was."

== Bibliography ==
- Cooper, William J. (2000). Jefferson Davis, American. New York: Alfred A. Knopf. ISBN 978-0-307-77264-0.
- Davis, William C. (1996). Jefferson Davis: The Man and His Hour. Louisiana State University Press. ISBN 978-0-8071-2079-8.
