= John F. Wall =

United States Army general

John Furman Wall
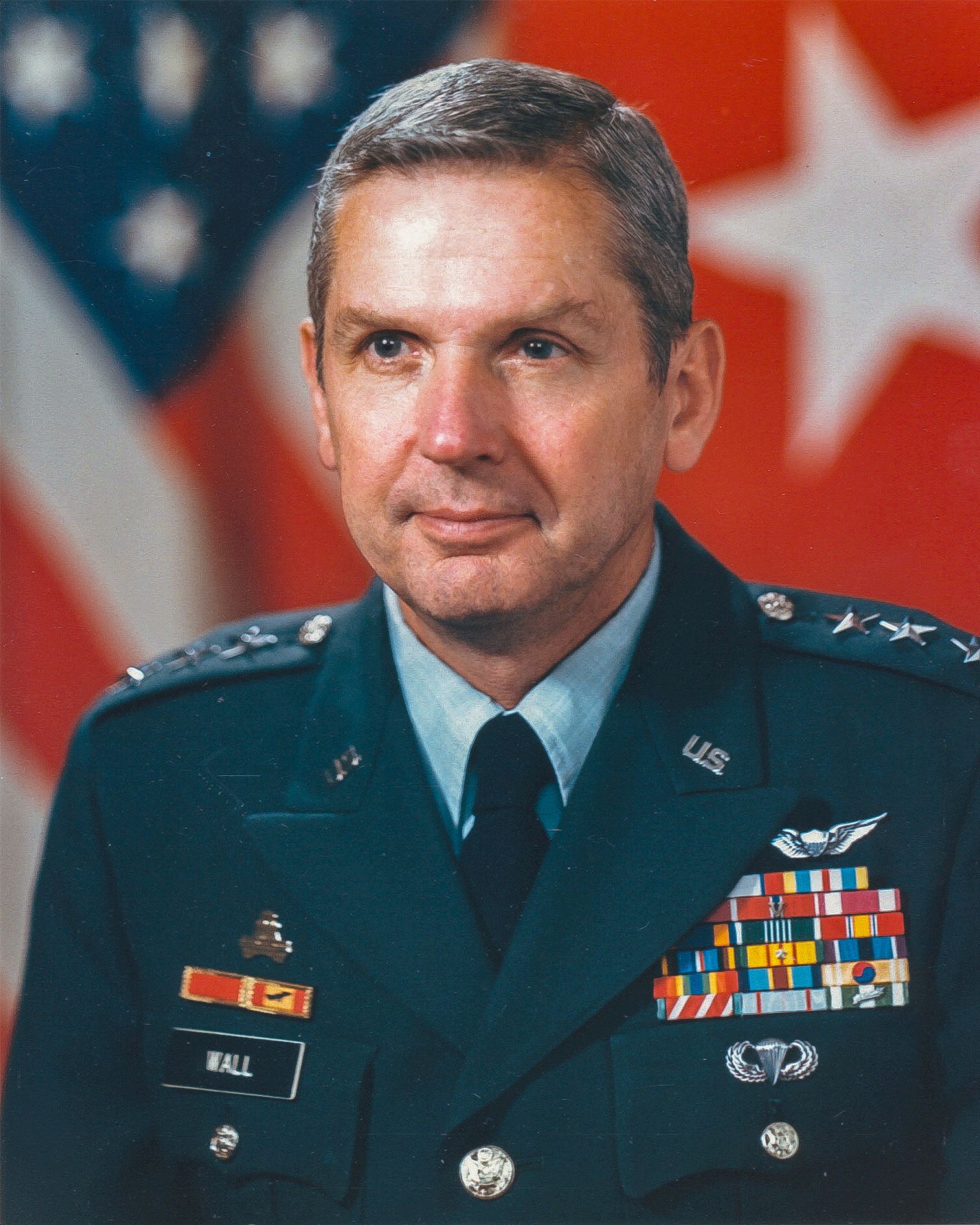
- Born: October 19, 1931; Boise, Idaho, U.S.
- Died: March 28, 2024 (aged 92); West Columbia, South Carolina
- Military career
- Allegiance: United States
- Branch: United States Army
- Rank: Lieutenant general
- Commands: Strategic Defense Command

John Furman Wall (October 19, 1931 - March 28, 2024) was a retired lieutenant general in the United States Army. He served as Commander of the United States Army Strategic Defense Command.
