= Thomas T. Fauntleroy (lawyer) =

American judge and politician (1823–1906)

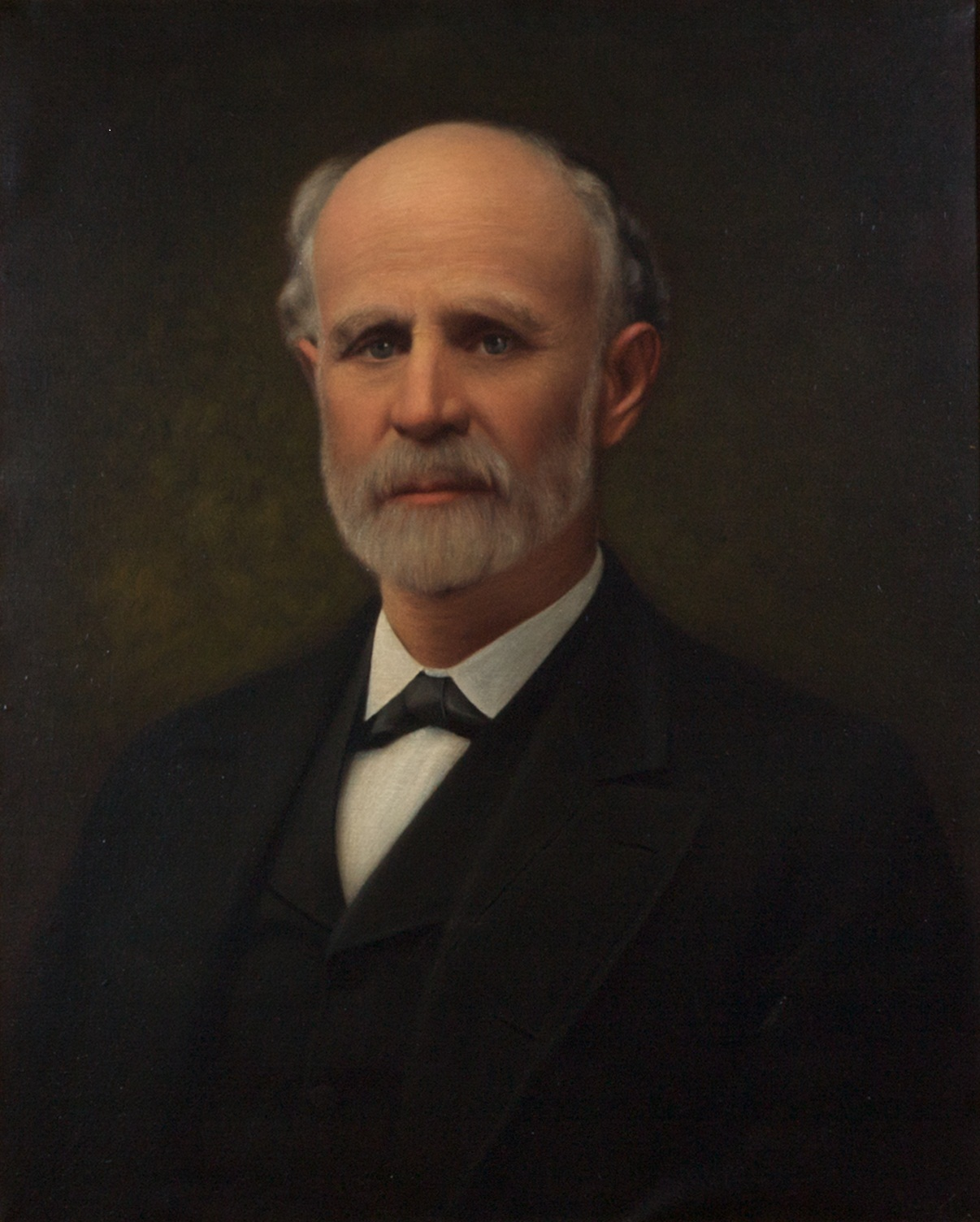

Justice of the Supreme Court of Virginia
- In office January 1, 1883 – January 1, 1895
- Preceded by: Edward C. Burks
- Succeeded by: John Alexander Buchanan

Member of the Virginia House of Delegates from the Frederick County district
- In office December 7, 1857 – December 4, 1859 Serving with M. R. Kaufman
- Preceded by: R. C. Bywaters
- Succeeded by: George W. Ward

Member of the Virginia House of Delegates from the Frederick County district
- In office December 5, 1877 – December 2, 1879 Serving with Nimrod Whitacre
- Preceded by: John F. Wall
- Succeeded by: Edmund P. Dandridge

Personal details
- Born: Thomas T. Fauntleroy Jr. December 20, 1823 Winchester, Virginia, U.S.
- Died: October 2, 1906 (aged 82) St. Louis, Missouri, U.S.
- Parent: Thomas T. Fauntleroy (father)
- Education: University of Virginia

Thomas Turner Fauntleroy Jr. (December 20, 1823 – October 2, 1906) was a Virginia attorney, politician, slave owner, and judge of the Virginia Supreme Court of Appeals.

== Early and family life ==
Fauntleroy was born in Winchester, Virginia. He was the second son of a career U.S. Army officer, ultimately Colonel Thomas Turner Fauntleroy and his wife, the former Ann Magdalene Magill. He had several brothers and sisters. His son would later trace the family's ancestry to Lt. Col. Charles Mynn Thruston and Lt. Charles Magill of Winchester, who both served in the American Revolutionary War (Magill on General Washington's staff). Thus, the family could trace its descent from the First Families of Virginia. Although Col. Fauntleroy was assigned various commands in the western U.S. territories, his family remained in Frederick county. Thomas Jr. received a private education suitable for his class, including at Benjamin Hallowell High School in Alexandria and the University of Virginia in Charlottesville, where he studied law and graduated in 1844.

Thomas Jr. married twice. In 1850 he married Ann Hite Williams, who died shortly after the birth of Philip Williams Fauntleroy (1852-1931). The widower remarried on December 30, 1858, to Bettie S. Hite, who gave birth to Cornelius Williams Fauntleroy (1859-1921); Thomas Turner Fauntleroy III (1862-1947), Ann Magill Fauntleroy Ball (1865-1956), Robert B. Fauntleroy (1868-1955) and Joseph W. Fauntleroy (1872-1959).

== Career ==
In 1847, Fauntleroy began private practice in Winchester and in 1850 was elected Commonwealth's Attorney for Frederick County. In 1860, he owned four slaves (65 and 25 year old Black women and 2 and 5-year-old girls). Frederick county voters twice elected Fauntleroy as one of their delegates in the Virginia General Assembly, so he served (part-time) from 1857 to 1859 and again in 1877. In the prewar election, he and M. R. Kaufman ousted the two previous delegates, and the following term, George W. Ward received the most votes and was seated alongside Kaufman.

As the American Civil War began, the elder Fauntleroy gave up his U.S. Army commission and returned to Virginia, where he lived with this son. He had accepted a commission as general in the Virginia militia, but not a Confederate States Army commission, unlike two of his sons (this Fauntleroy's brothers). His eldest son C. M. Fauntleroy also resigned his U.S. Navy commission, but the ship he commanded, the CSS Rappahannock, was never permitted to leave European waters. His brother Dr. Archibald Magill Fauntleroy served as a Confederate surgeon.

Despite health problems following the Civil War, after agreeing not to again own enslaved people and receiving a presidential pardon on September 29, 1865, Fauntleroy resumed his legal practice and political career.

In 1877, Fauntleroy and Nimrod Whitacre ousted the previous men representing Frederick County in the Virginia House of Delegates, but after subsequent redistricting, Edmund P. Dandridge became the sole representative of Winchester and Frederick County. In 1879 Fauntleroy became the Secretary of the Commonwealth of Virginia, a position appointed by the Governor. In 1882, the Readjuster Party had taken control of the state legislature, and refused to renew the 12-year terms of members of the Supreme Court of Appeals (all but one selected immediately after Virginia voters accepted a new state constitution after the Civil War which prohibited slavery) and elected four members effective January 1, 1883. Fauntleroy, Benjamin W. Lacy, Drury A. Hinton and Robert A. Richardson served together on the appellate bench for their twelve-year terms until again the legislature (now controlled by the Democratic Party) refused to renew their terms, so five successors took office in January 1895.(thus the succession box above is arbitrary)

== Later life and death ==
After his judicial service, Fauntleroy moved first to St. Paul, Minnesota, then to St. Louis, Missouri, where his namesake son lived and where Judge Fauntleroy died. His remains were returned for burial at historic Mount Hebron cemetery in Winchester, Virginia. His widow survived him by two decades and died in Washington, D.C., but is buried beside him.

== Sources ==
- S. S. P. Patteson, "The Supreme Court of Appeals of Virginia," Green Bag5 (Sept. 1893): 417–418.
- Obituary in Virginia Law Register 12 (1906): 586–587.
