= Rosedown Plantation =

- U.S. National Register of Historic Places
- U.S. National Historic Landmark District
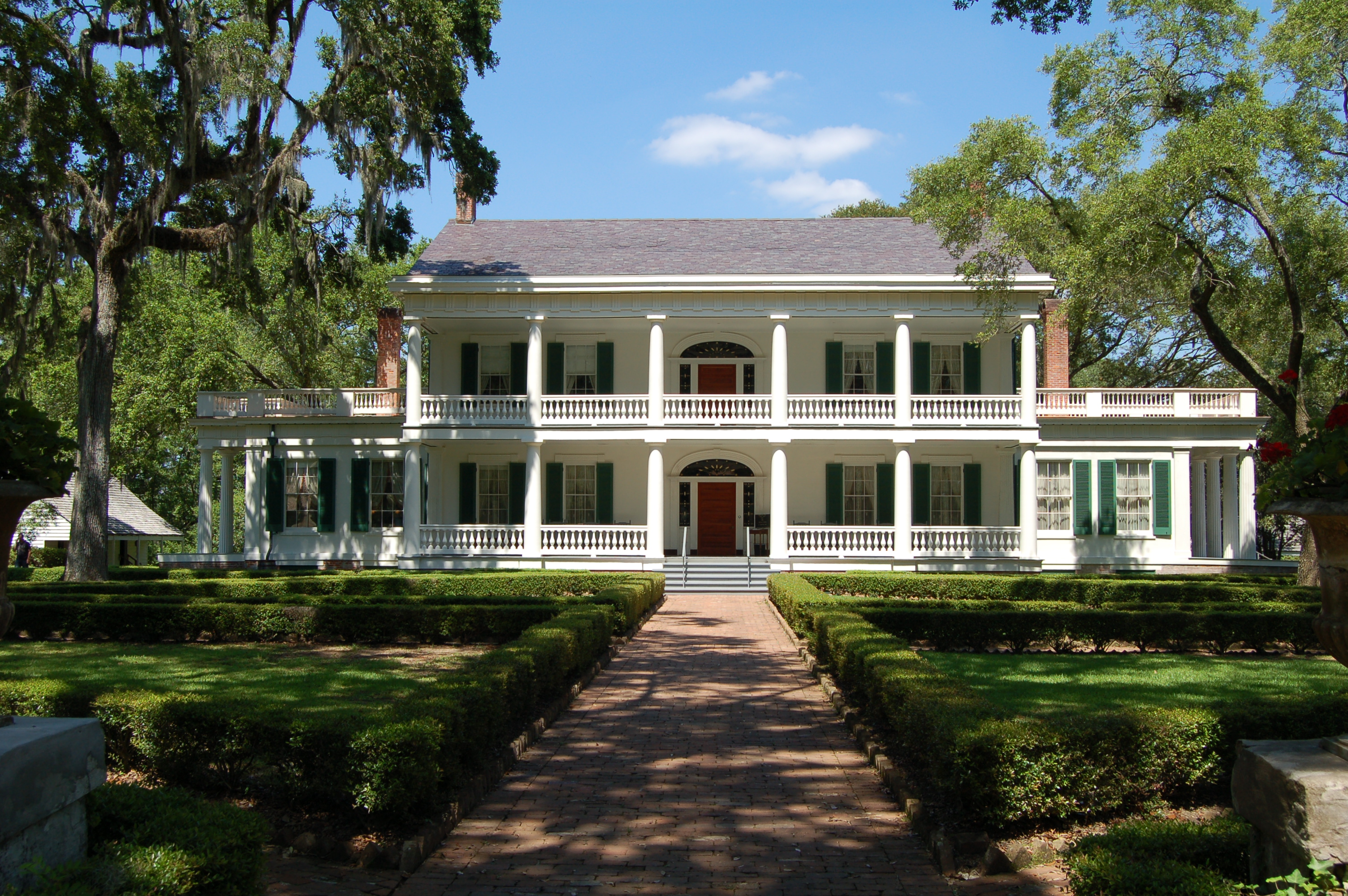
- Rosedown Plantation

- Location within Louisiana Location within the United States
- Location: 12501 La. Hwy. 10, Saint Francisville, West Feliciana Parish, Louisiana
- Coordinates: 30.796015°N 91.370945°W
- Area: 371 acres (150 ha)
- Built: 1835
- Architectural style: Federal, Greek Revival
- NRHP reference No.: 01000765

Significant dates
- Added to NRHP: August 7, 2001
- Designated NHLD: April 5, 2005

Rosedown Plantation State Historic Site is an 8,000-square-foot (740 m^{2}) historic home and former plantation located in St. Francisville, Louisiana, United States. Commissioned in 1835 by owners Daniel and Martha Turnbull and built by enslaved people under their control, Rosedown is one of the most documented and intact plantation complexes in the Southern United States. It is known for its extensive formal gardens surrounding the house.

== House and grounds ==
=== Architecture ===
Sited on the highest point of the plantation at the edge of a bluff on Alexander Creek, Daniel Turnbull contracted with carpenter Wendell Wright to construct a house in the transitional Federal-Greek Revival– style designed by an unknown architect. Built of cypress and cedar milled primarily onsite, the westward facing five bay, two-story house features a two-story gallery with smooth Doric columns and a bulbous vase like balustrade, matching fluted pilasters and a Doric entablature. At the center of the house, both upstairs and down, is a Federal-style elliptical arch doorway with six horizontal panels, distinguished by boldly formed fluting, a layered entablature, a keystone, and leaded patterns superimposed on the glass. The fanlight features a series of loops in a radial design, while the side lights feature ovals and roundels. T.S. Williams added one-story brick side wings to the north and south of the building in 1845, with Greek-style end porticoes.

The south elevation has a three-column Doric portico spanning its width, while the north wing, though larger of the two, has only a two-column portico. The columns at the end of both wings are fluted while the pilasters are smooth, and the Doric entablature and eave treatment match the main block. Each wing is topped by a balustrade with balusters similar in shape to those on the gallery, while the main block's side elevations feature a wooden fan design in the gable peaks. The eastern-facing rear elevation has a small room on each side of a porch set under a shed roof.

=== Interiors ===
Rosedown's floorplan is in the French or Early Louisiana design in contrast to the American scheme of a hall through the center of the house. The plan has a main entrance hall, decorated with block-printed wallpaper by Joseph Dufour et Cie of Paris, with an elliptical mahogany staircase to the second floor, a parlor to the right, music room to the left, and an office, butler's pantry and dining room in the rear that features a punkah. Upstairs are the family bedrooms. The north wing houses a guest bedroom with an en-suite bathroom that features an early form of a shower supplied with water from a cistern on the roof. The bedroom was built to house a suite of furniture that was originally to have been installed in the Lincoln Bedroom at the White House for the presidency of Henry Clay. Clay lost the election in 1844, and Daniel Turnbull, a Clay supporter, purchased the 13-foot-tall rosewood Gothic Revival bed. The bed was found in the room for over 150 years until the last private owner of Rosedown sold it to the Dallas Museum of Art for $450,000. The south wing houses a library that Turnbull utilized as an office for his oversight of the plantation. The home was furnished with imported goods from Philadelphia, New Orleans, and Europe. Most of the furnishings remained with the house during the years after the American Civil War, and a large percentage of original pieces are still displayed at Rosedown, including a tapestry stitched by Martha Washington.

=== Grounds ===
The grounds of Rosedown are currently composed of 371 acres (150 ha) with the focal point being the 18 acres (7.3 ha) of ornamental gardens that were inspired by the great formal gardens of France, Italy, and England that were visited by the Turnbulls on their European Grand Tour. One of the few privately maintained formal gardens in the United States, they were overseen by amateur horticulturalist Martha Turnbull, who kept a detailed garden diary during her 60-year tenure at Rosedown. The gardens began before the house's construction, and in 1836, there are records showing the purchase of camellias, azaleas, and other plants from William Prince & Sons in New York.

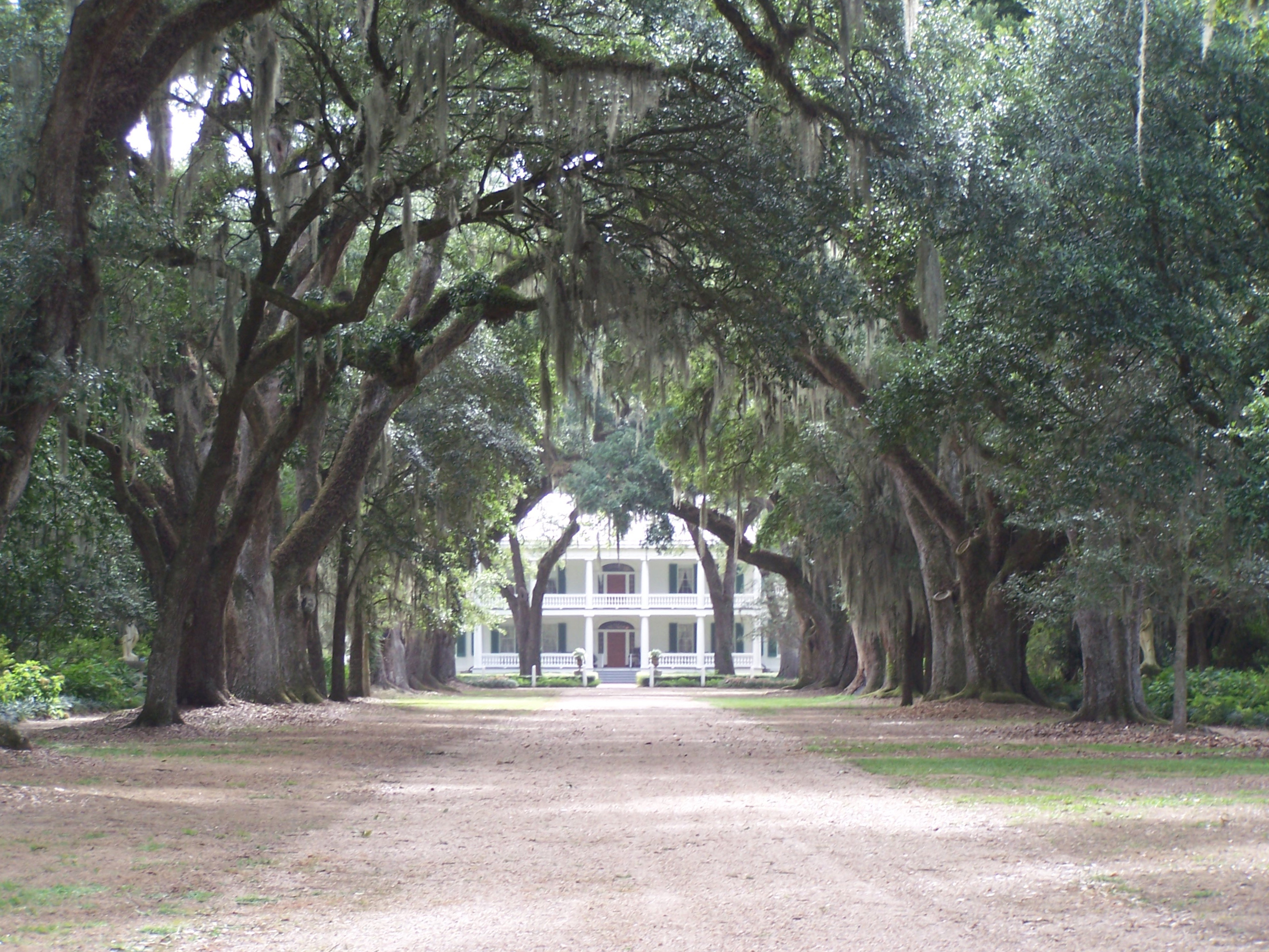
Rosedown Plantation in 2008, viewed from the 660-foot-oak (200 m) tree allée

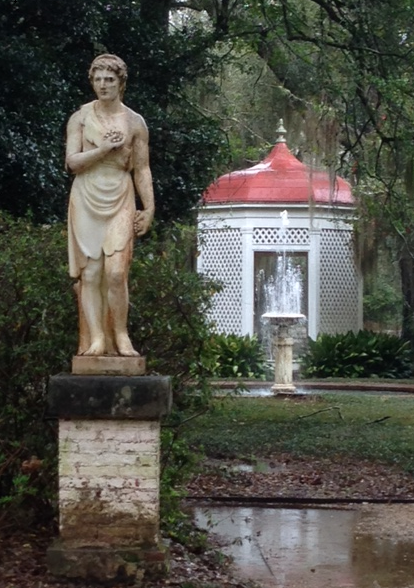
Rosedown Garden gazebo

The landscaped gardens are accessed through a Greek-Revival wooden gate at the head of a 660-foot-long (200 m) oak allée or tree avenue that terminates at a large oval forecourt with a diamond yaupon holly parterre flanked by two water oaks in front of the house. The unique length of the allée reflected a 19th-century land survey technique when the property was measured with 66-foot long chains, meaning that the allée is ten chains long.

Eight white marble Italian sculptures on brick pedestals accent the allée. However, these are not original to the landscape. The previous owner removed the twelve statues that the Turnbulls purchased in Italy in 1851, and the eight now found are close approximations of the originals. Flanking the allée are both Baroque gardens with formal geometrical landscaping, as well as English style gardens with meandering paths that include now rare varieties of plants.

The sunniest and most open area of the gardens is what is referred to as the Flower Garden, located to the southwest of the house. Planted with several varieties of roses, the layout combines rectangular forms with irregular, curved paths and ornamented with one of three latticed gazebos with onion-domed roofs found on the property. Nearby is an underground hothouse (heated greenhouse) and brick tool shed that had at one time been connected to a greenhouse which is no longer extant. The other two gazebos center the extensive gardens on each side of the allée and are placed directly opposite each other to imply a cross-axis. The gardens were restored in 1956 by landscape architect Ralph Ellis Gunn, whose sensitive renovations included adding a reservoir to the southeast of the house and fountains to complement the existing gardens.

Near the main house are several ancillary buildings, including a Greek temple-style doctor's office, privy, milk-house, wood shed, and barn. Originally Rosedown had two wings that attached to the rear of the house. The north wing housed the kitchen that was moved up and attached to the house at an unknown date, while the south wing was added in 1859 to accommodate the Turnbulls once they turned the house over to their daughter Sarah and her family. During the restoration in 1956, the kitchen wing was removed and reconstructed near the house, while the south wing, now known as "Miss Nina's wing", was moved a few yards to the southeast to overlook the reservoir.

== History ==
=== 19th-century ===
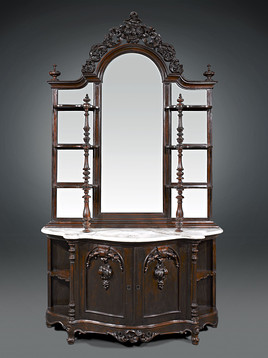
Étagère from Rosedown Plantation. 19th Century Rococo Revival

When Rosedown was constructed, society in and around St. Francisville was dominated by European, primarily British, settlers who became cotton planters on an enormous scale. Most of the 19th-century cotton barons in the area had requested and received their lands through the Spanish government, the titles to which remained valid after the establishment of the United States government. The parents of Martha Barrow Turnbull, who owned the land that later became Rosedown, achieved high social status in West Feliciana through their immense cotton operations, and Daniel Turnbull himself was known before the American Civil War as one of the wealthiest men in the nation.

Rosedown, named for a play that the Turnbulls saw on their honeymoon, was not assembled via Spanish land grants but in a group of seven purchases made by Daniel Turnbull from the 1820s through the 1840s. At its largest, Rosedown comprised approximately 3,455 acres, mostly planted in cotton. Daniel and Martha began construction on the main house at Rosedown in November 1834, completing it six months later in May 1835, for a total cost of $13,109.20. The labor of enslaved people to construct and upkeep the plantation accrued immense wealth to Daniel Turnbull. During peak years of cotton production, Daniel enslaved 444 people, with around 250 working just at Rosedown.

The couple had three children, William, Sarah, and James Daniel. James Daniel died of yellow fever in 1843 at 7. William married Caroline Butler and had two children, William and Daniel. In 1856, William drowned in a boating accident while crossing "Old River" at 27. That left their daughter Sarah, who had married James Pirrie Bowman from nearby Oakley Plantation, to inherit the plantation. The Bowmans moved into Rosedown and had ten children, eight girls, and two boys. Martha and Daniel Turnbull retired to a wing in the back of the house in 1859 to accommodate Bowman's growing family.

Daniel died in 1861, the same year Louisiana joined the Confederacy and declared war against the United States. The war ravaged Rosedown and two other Turnbull plantations. Martha Turnbull managed Rosedown after the war. No longer able to operate on the free labor of enslaved people, the family relied on the labor of 250 sharecroppers.

=== 20th-century ===
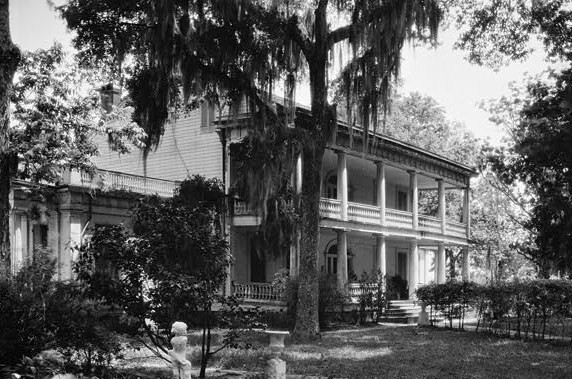
Rosedown Plantation in 1934

Martha Turnbull died in September 1896, leaving Sarah in sole possession of Rosedown. After Sarah died in 1914, Sarah's four unmarried daughters, Corrie, Isabel, Sarah, and Nina, took over the plantation. In the 1920s, they opened the house to tourists interested in the remnants of the prosperous cotton culture. The sisters sacrificed to hold Rosedown, and when Nina, the last surviving sister, died in 1955, no bills or mortgages were outstanding on the property; they still had 3,000 acres of land and the house with all its furnishings. The family was Episcopalian and are interred at the Grace Church Cemetery in St. Francisville.

After Nina's death, Rosedown passed to her nieces and nephews, who sold the plantation in 1956, to oil heiress Catherine Fondren Underwood, an enthusiastic amateur horticulturalist, and her husband, Milton Underwood. The Underwoods began an eight-year, $10-million restoration to restore the house and formal gardens to their former grandeur while the plantation functioned as a working cattle farm. The house was opened to the public in 1964.

=== 21st-century ===
Rosedown Plantation was purchased in 2000 by the Louisiana Office of State Parks as a state historic site to illustrate plantation life in the 1800s. The plantation was declared a National Historic Landmark in 2005.

== Cultural references ==
In South and West: From a Notebook, Joan Didion writes that Ben Toledano's wife suggested she visit the Rosedown Plantation as well as the Asphodel Plantation, the Oakley Plantation and Stanton Hall to better understand the culture of the Southern United States.

== See also ==
- List of Louisiana state historic sites
- Audubon State Historic Site (Oakley Plantation), also in West Feliciana Parish
- In East Feliciana Parish:
  - Centenary College of Louisiana at Jackson; Centenary State Historic Site
  - Port Hudson State Historic Site & (in neighboring East Baton Rouge Parish) Port Hudson National Cemetery
- List of National Historic Landmarks in Louisiana
- List of plantations in Louisiana
