= Asphodel Plantation =

Historic house in Louisiana, United States

- Asphodel Plantation and Cemetery
- U.S. National Register of Historic Places
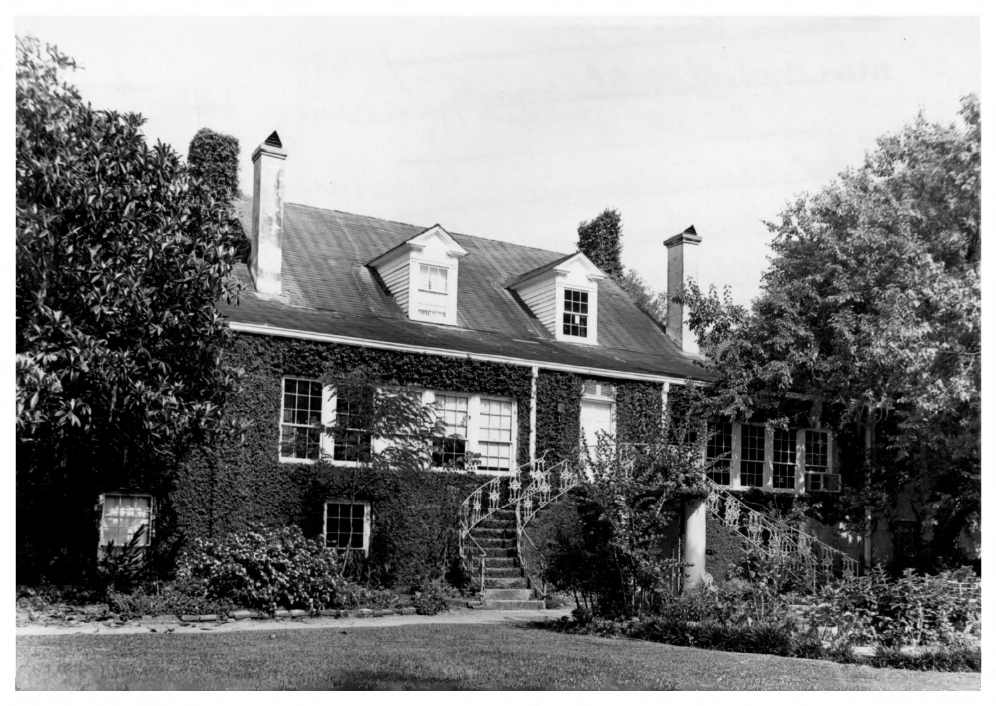

- Location within Louisiana Location within the United States
- Location: About 3.5 miles (5.6 km) south of Jackson on LA 68
- Nearest city: Jackson, Louisiana
- Coordinates: 30°47′12″N 91°13′02″W
- Area: 51.4 acres (20.8 ha)
- Built: c.1830
- Built by: Benjamin Kendrick
- Architectural style: Greek Revival
- NRHP reference No.: 72000552
- Added to NRHP: November 15, 1972

The Asphodel Plantation is a historic building and former plantation, completed in c.1830 and located about 3.5 miles (5.6 km) south of Jackson, Louisiana, United States. It was built by Benjamin Kendrick, a cotton planter and slave owner.

Both the house and the cemetery on the property were listed on the National Register of Historic Places on November 15, 1972.

== History ==
The Asphodel Plantation was built as a cottage between 1820 until 1830, by Benjamin Kendrick (1779–1838) as a gift to his wife Caroline (née Pollard; ?–1833). The name "Asphodel" is a term derived from the liliaceous plant family; it was used in ancient Greece and by 18th century English and French poets to describe either daffodils (or narcissus). During Kendrick's ownership of the property, enslaved African American labor was used on this plantation to grow cotton.

In 1838, Asphodel Plantation was inherited by his daughter Isabella Kendrick Fluker (1816–1875) and her husband, Colonel David Jones Fluker. During the siege of Port Hudson in 1863, in the midst of the American Civil War, "a group of Union soldiers set fire to Asphodel" but "the fire went out."

The house was restored and renovated by the new owner John Fetzers and his sons, starting in 1949. It was purchased by Robert E. Couhig in July 1958.

== Architecture ==
The architecture of Asphodel Plantation is Greek Revival architecture style, complete with six doric columns in the front exterior. The front exterior of the building is symmetrical and has two front doors. The structure has 14 rooms.

== Legacy ==
The house and cemetery are listed on the National Register of Historic Places since November 15, 1972. Author Lyle Saxon described Asphodel as the "jewel of Louisiana."

When the plantation was being built, John James Audubon came to Asphodel to paint portraits of Isabella Kendrick Fluker and two of her sons; the paintings are located in Virginia and have the inscription, "painted at their beloved Asphodel".

In South and West: From a Notebook, Joan Didion writes that Ben Toledano's wife suggested she visit the Asphodel Plantation as well as the Rosedown Plantation, the Oakley Plantation and Stanton Hall to understand the American South better.

== See also ==
- List of plantations in Louisiana
- National Register of Historic Places listings in East Feliciana Parish, Louisiana
