= Stanton Hall =

Mansion in Mississippi, United States

- U.S. National Register of Historic Places
- U.S. National Historic Landmark
- Mississippi Landmark
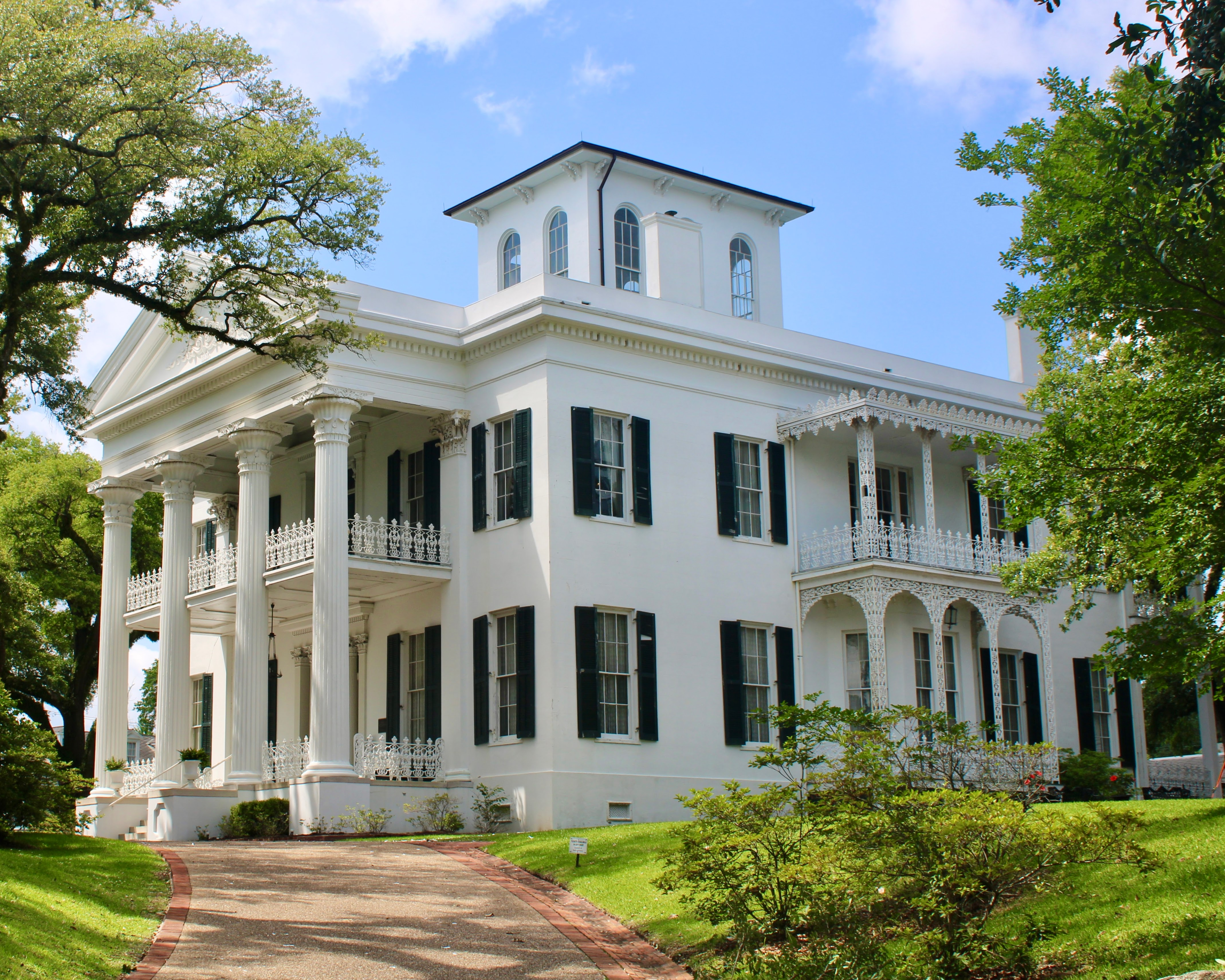
- Stanton Hall in 2024

- Location within Mississippi Location within the United States
- Location: 401 High Street, Natchez, Mississippi
- Coordinates: 31.562621°N 91.400730°W
- Built: 1851
- Built by: Thomas Rose
- Architectural style: Greek Revival
- NRHP reference No.: 74002254
- USMS No.: 001-NAT-0188-NHL-NRD-ML

Significant dates
- Added to NRHP: May 30, 1974
- Designated NHL: May 30, 1974
- Designated USMS: March 21, 1995

Stanton Hall, also known as Belfast, is a Greek Revival mansion within the Natchez On-Top-of-the-Hill Historic District at 401 High Street in Natchez, Mississippi. Built in the 1850s, it is one of the most opulent antebellum mansions to survive in the southeastern United States. It is now operated as a historic house museum by the Pilgrimage Garden Club. The house was declared a National Historic Landmark in 1974; a contributing property to the Natchez On-Top-of-the-Hill Historic District in 1979; and a Mississippi Landmark in 1995. It is open for tours year round.

== Description ==
Stanton Hall occupies an entire 2-acre (0.81 ha) city block north of downtown Natchez, bounded by High, Commerce, Monroe, and Pearl Streets. The property is ringed by wrought iron fencing with elaborate gate posts. The house is a three-story brick structure, plastered and painted white. It was designed and built by Thomas Rose, a local builder and English immigrant.

Its front entrance features a two-story Greek temple portico, with four fluted cast-iron Corinthian columns supporting an entablature and gabled pediment. Spaces between the columns have decorative iron railings, repeated in a second-floor balcony railing set under the portico. The main roof is hipped, and truncated with a large cupola at the center. The interior is elaborately decorated, using materials such as imported Italian marble, textiles from Paris and chandeliers made of glass and bronze. The main hall has ceilings nearly 17 feet high, with an exquisitely carved overhead arch. The ceilings are embellished with circular arabesques borderd by geometrical friezes. The large front parlor and smaller back parlor combined measure 72 feet long, and are together sometimes called the Music Room. An arch similar to the one in the main hall separates the parlors. The carpet in the parlors is a reproduction of a Natchez design from 1850. The bronze chandeliers in the house were made by Cornelius & Baker of Philadelphia.

== History ==
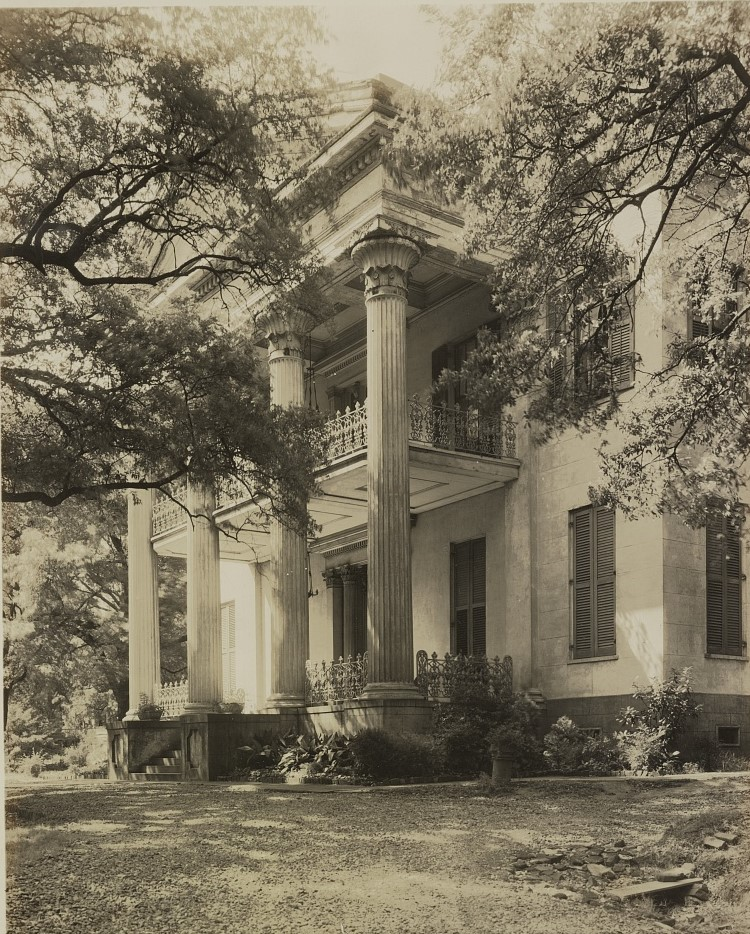
Photograph of Stanton Hall by Frances Benjamin Johnston, 1938

Stanton Hall was built during 1851–1857 for Frederick Stanton, a cotton broker. Stanton named it "Belfast", but only lived in it for nine months before he died of yellow fever. The house's scale and opulence made it a great financial burden on his heirs, but it survived the American Civil War, and in 1890 was made home to the Stanton College for Young Ladies. In 1940 it was acquired by the Pilgrimage Garden Club, which uses it as its headquarters and operates it as a museum and event venue.

== In popular culture ==
The house's insides have appeared in ABC's mini-series North and South as the Mains' mansion interiors. (Note: The exteriors were filmed at the Boone Hall Plantation, near Charleston, South Carolina) The house was also seen briefly in Show Boat (1951).

In South and West: From a Notebook, Joan Didion writes that Ben Toledano's wife suggested she visit Stanton Hall as well as the Asphodel Plantation, the Oakley Plantation and the Rosedown Plantation to understand the South better.

== See also ==
- List of National Historic Landmarks in Mississippi
- National Register of Historic Places listings in Adams County, Mississippi
