= Locust Grove State Historic Site =

Family cemetery in West Feliciana Parish, Louisiana

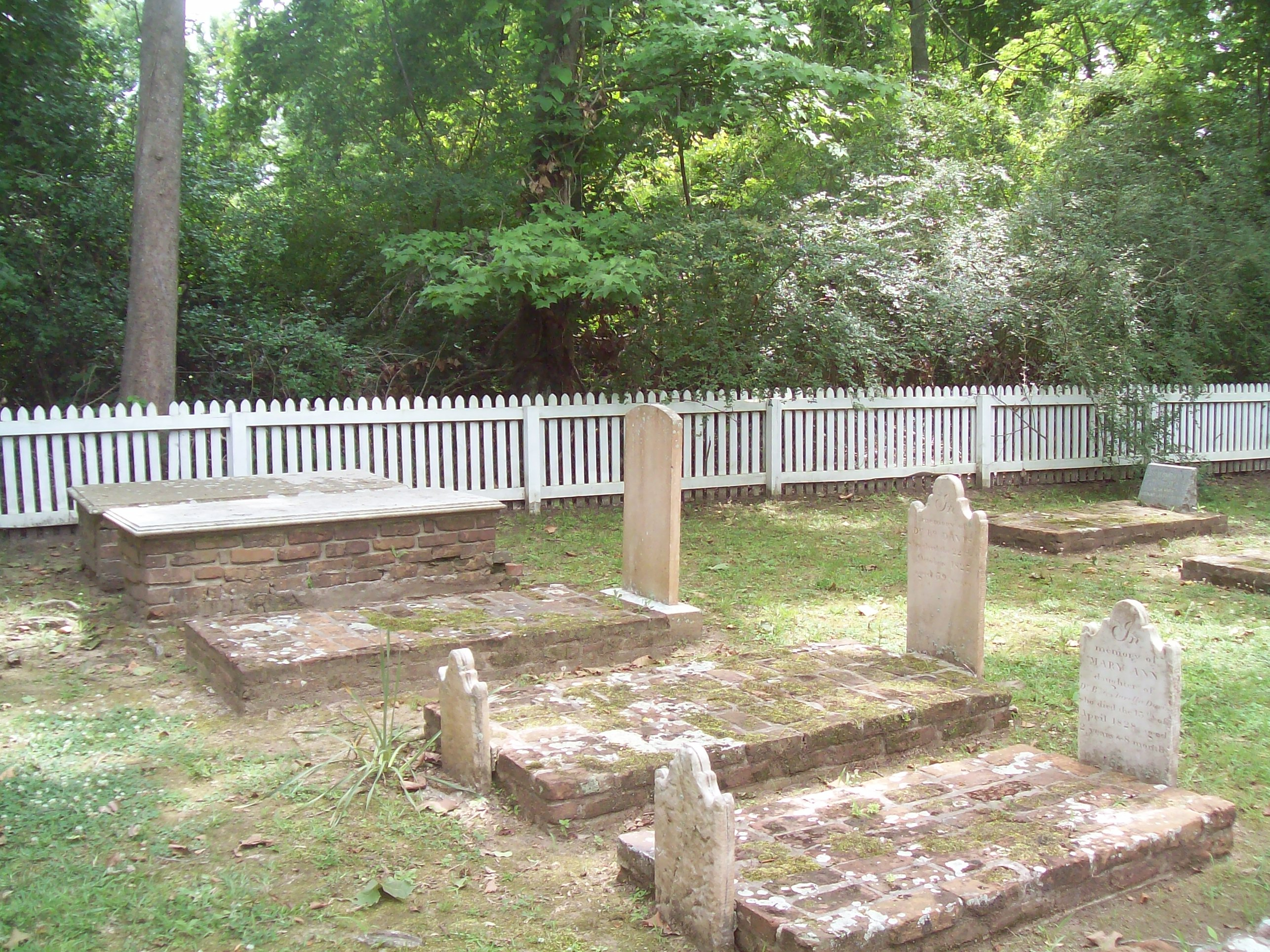
- The cemetery is the last artifact of a plantation that once was at the site.

- Location within Louisiana Location within the United States
- Location: St. Francisville, Louisiana, United States
- Coordinates: 30°50′27″N 91°20′08″W
- Area: 1 acre (0.40 ha)
- Governing body: Louisiana Office of State Parks
- Website: Official web page

Locust Grove State Historic Site, located near St. Francisville, Louisiana, commemorates a family cemetery that is part of the former Locust Grove Plantation. Locust Grove Plantation was once owned by the family of former Confederate President Jefferson Davis' sister Anna E. Davis Smith. Among the notable figures buried at the cemetery are Sarah Knox Taylor Davis, daughter of General Zachary Taylor and first wife of Jefferson Davis, and Eleazer Wheelock Ripley, a distinguished general who served in the War of 1812. Locust Grove Cemetery was deeded to the Office of State Parks in 1937 by heirs of Mrs. Anna E. Davis Smith.

== See also ==
- Audubon State Historic Site
- Port Hudson State Historic Site
- List of Louisiana state historic sites
