= List of Louisiana state historic sites =

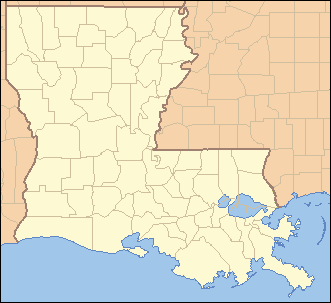
Map of areas maintained by the Office of State Parks
(Each dot is linked to the corresponding historic site article)

This List of Louisiana state historic sites contains the 17 state historic sites governed by the Office of State Parks, a division of Louisiana Department of Culture, Recreation and Tourism in the U.S. state of Louisiana, as of 2011. State historic sites were formerly known as state commemorative areas until July 1, 1999 with the passing of House Bill No. 462, which renamed them to state historic sites.

== 2010 budget cuts ==
Due to state budget cuts in 2010, Los Adaes and Winter Quarters State Historic Site were placed on 'caretaker status'. Later in the year on July 26, five more historic sites were put on caretaker status. These sites included Centenary SHS, Fort Jesup, Fort Pike, Marksville, and Plaquemine Lock.

Fort Jesup State Historic Site was removed from the list on November 12, 2010 with support from the town of Many, The Sabine River Authority, and parish tourism officials. Plaquemine Lock State Historic Site was reopened on January 5, 2011 with help of the local government. However, funds for Centenary State Historic Site, also in Jackson, weren't obtained to open it along with Plaquemine Lock State Historic Site. While the boat launch of Fort Pike reopened to the public on January 11, 2011, the historic site itself is still under caretaker status and available by appointment only.

== State historic sites ==
| Site Name | Parish | Area | Photo |
|---|---|---|---|
| Audubon State Historic Site | West Feliciana Parish | 100 acres (40 ha) | |
| Centenary State Historic Site | East Feliciana Parish | 43 acres (17 ha) | |
| Fort Jesup State Historic Site | Sabine Parish | 21 acres (8.5 ha) | |
| Fort Pike State Historic Site | Orleans Parish | 22 acres (9 ha) | |
| Fort St. Jean Baptiste State Historic Site | Natchitoches Parish | 5 acres (2 ha) | |
| Forts Randolph and Buhlow State Historic Site | Rapides Parish | 103 acres (42 ha) | |
| Locust Grove State Historic Site | West Feliciana Parish | 1 acre (.4 ha) | |
| Longfellow-Evangeline State Historic Site | St. Martin Parish | 157 acres (64 ha) | |
| Los Adaes State Historic Site | Natchitoches Parish | 14 acres (6 ha) | |
| Mansfield State Historic Site | De Soto Parish | 178 acres (72 ha) | |
| Plaquemine Lock State Historic Site | Iberville Parish | 14 acres (6 ha) | |
| Port Hudson State Historic Site | East Feliciana Parish | 900 acres (364 ha) | |
| Poverty Point State Historic Site | West Carroll Parish | 400 acres (162 ha) | |
| Rebel State Historic Site | Natchitoches Parish | 46 acres (19 ha) | |
| Rosedown Plantation State Historic Site | West Feliciana Parish | 371 acres (150 ha) | |
| Winter Quarters State Historic Site | Tensas Parish | 7 acres (2.8 ha) | |

== Former state historic sites ==
The following were once Louisiana state historic sites, but for one reason or another are no longer current state historic sites.

| Former State Historic Site | Parish | Date established | Date jurisdiction changed | Remarks |
|---|---|---|---|---|
| Kent House | Rapides Parish | | 1983 | The Plantation home was turned over to Kisatchie Delta Regional Planning and Development District, Inc, in Rapides Parish in 1983. Friends of Kent House group started helping to maintain the plantation in 1999. |
| Fort DeRussy | Avoyelles Parish | 1999 | 2016 | The site is currently being administered by the City of Marksville. |
| Marksville State Historic Site | Avoyelles Parish | 1952 | 2020 | Site was turned over to the City of Marksville, Louisiana, after being closed to the public since 2016. |

== See also ==
- List of Louisiana state parks
- Louisiana State Arboretum
