= Port Hudson State Historic Site =

- Location within the United States
- Location: East Feliciana Parish, Louisiana
- Nearest city: Jackson, Louisiana
- Coordinates: 30°41′36″N 91°16′33″W
- Governing body: Louisiana Department of Culture, Recreation, and Tourism; Office of State Parks
- Port Hudson
- U.S. National Register of Historic Places
- U.S. National Historic Landmark
- Location within Louisiana Location within the United States
- NRHP reference No.: 74002349

Significant dates
- Added to NRHP: May 30, 1974
- Designated NHL: May 30, 1974

The Port Hudson State Historic Site is located on the Mississippi River north of Baton Rouge in East Feliciana Parish, Louisiana, just outside the limits of Port Hudson and in the vicinity of Jackson. The site preserves a portion of the fortifications and battle area of the longest siege in American history, during the American Civil War from May 23 through July 9, 1863. The state of Louisiana maintains the site, which includes a museum about the siege, artillery displays, redoubts, and interpretive plaques. Historical reenactments are held each year. It was designated a National Historic Landmark in 1974, significant as the first place where African-American military units fought for the Union Army under African-American field leadership.

== Description ==
Port Hudson State Historic Site is located north of the community of Port Hudson, on the west side of United States Route 61. The property of the site extends west to Thompson Creek, and is bounded on the north by Sandy Creek and partly on the south by Foster Creek. This area forms a terrace about 65 to 80 feet (20 to 24 m) above the creeks, with twisting and steep terrain that made for a natural defensive position, and is where Union Army forces were dug in. The area immediately to the southwest of Foster Creek has similar terrain, and is where Confederate defensive positions were located. These positions were but a small portion of the total offensive and defensive positions, which entirely ringed the community, and included artillery emplacements overlooking the nearby Mississippi River.

An addition of 256 acres (1.04 km^{2}) to the site was made possible by The Conservation Fund using its Battlefield Revolving Fund established by grants from The Gilder Foundation and contributions from a number of partners, including the American Battlefield Trust.

Port Hudson National Cemetery, where many dead of the siege were buried, is located about 6 miles (9.7 km) to the south, in East Baton Rouge Parish.

== History ==
The Siege of Port Hudson was part of a concerted Union effort to gain full control of the Mississippi River. It was conducted May 22 – July 9, 1863, by forces under the command of Major General Nathaniel Prentice Banks, and only ended because the Confederate General Franklin Gardner surrendered after learning of the fall of Vicksburg, Mississippi to Union forces. General Banks gave orders to two units composed entirely of African Americans, the 1st and 3rd Louisiana Native Guards, to attack the Confederate positions south of Foster Creek on the morning of May 27. There was in Union military circles some question about how these units would perform, which were among the first to include African-American field commanders. The units acquitted themselves well, reaching to within 50 feet (15 m) of the Confederate batteries three times before being repulsed. The overall attack plan ordered by Banks was a failure, in part due to the piecemeal, disorganized, and uncoordinated execution of its elements. The units that fought against this position suffered 37 killed, 155 wounded, and 116 missing (out of just over 1,000 men deployed), and remained in the field until ordered to retreat at 4:00 pm.

== Soldiers' reburial ==
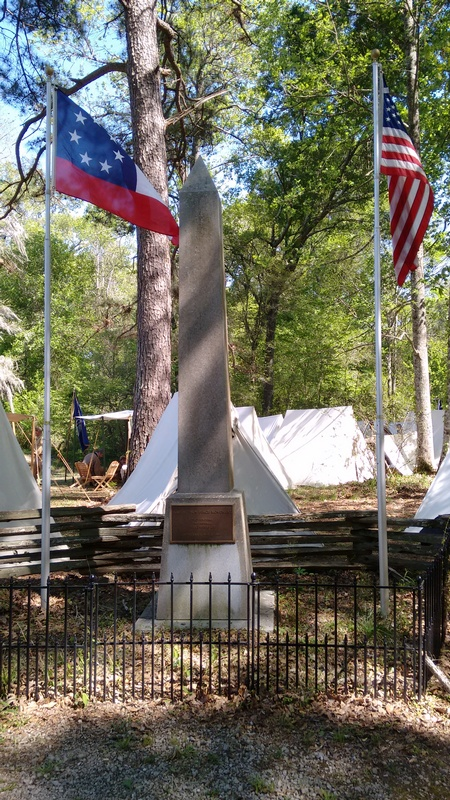
Port Hudson Peace Monument

In 1997 a dedication ceremony was held to pay tribute to all soldiers who died at the siege. A group of Civil War reenactors and a modern military honor guard escorted a gun carrier, which bore a wooden coffin containing the sparse remains of victims of both sides. Following the ceremony, the coffin was lowered to its final resting place beneath a single obelisk. The remains were found during an archaeological study began in 1987 to authenticate if graves of soldiers existed at the historic Port Hudson cemetery. Testing in the first season of the study found Confederate and Union buttons confirming the graves were military. An individual buried in a uniform with Union eagle buttons was probably a Union soldier who breached the line and was shot at close range receiving buck shot in the abdominal region.

Plaque on the monument reads:

Port Hudson Peace Monument

Two Soldiers
One Federal
One Confederate

Re-Interred May 27, 1997

== Archaeology surveys ==
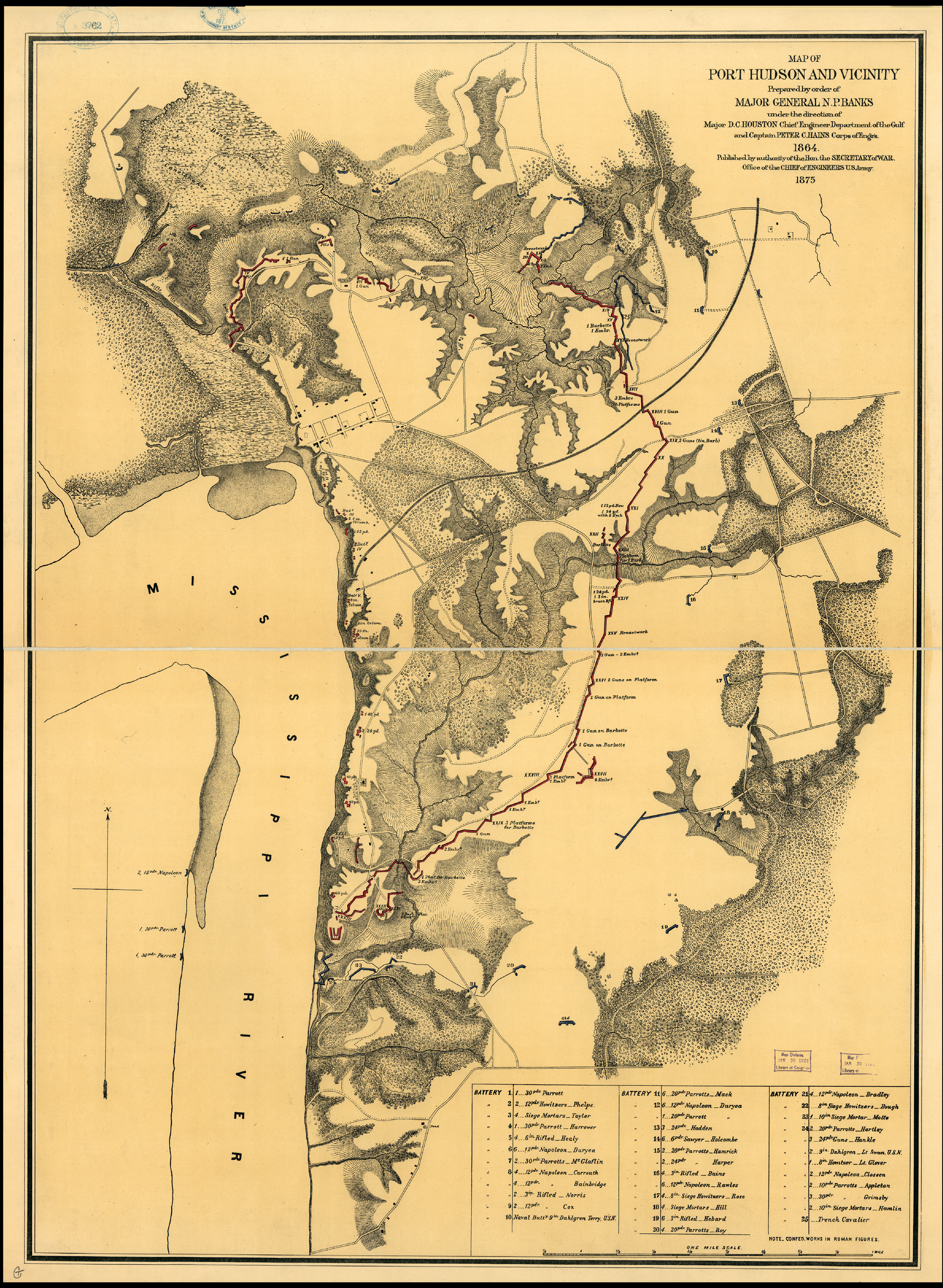
Port Hudson & Vicinity, 1864.

A survey of Union Siege Battery 8 was conducted by archaeology students from Louisiana State University. Goals of the survey included locating the exact boundaries of the battery and finding evidence of a zigzag trench, or sap, that historical accounts say the Union troops dug from the battery to a short distance from the Confederate lines. The project will also produce a digital topographical map of the area so that park staff may overlay with historical maps.

Battery 8 is located in the northeast portion of the Union Siege lines (view 1864 map).

== Gallery ==
Port Hudson State Historic Site

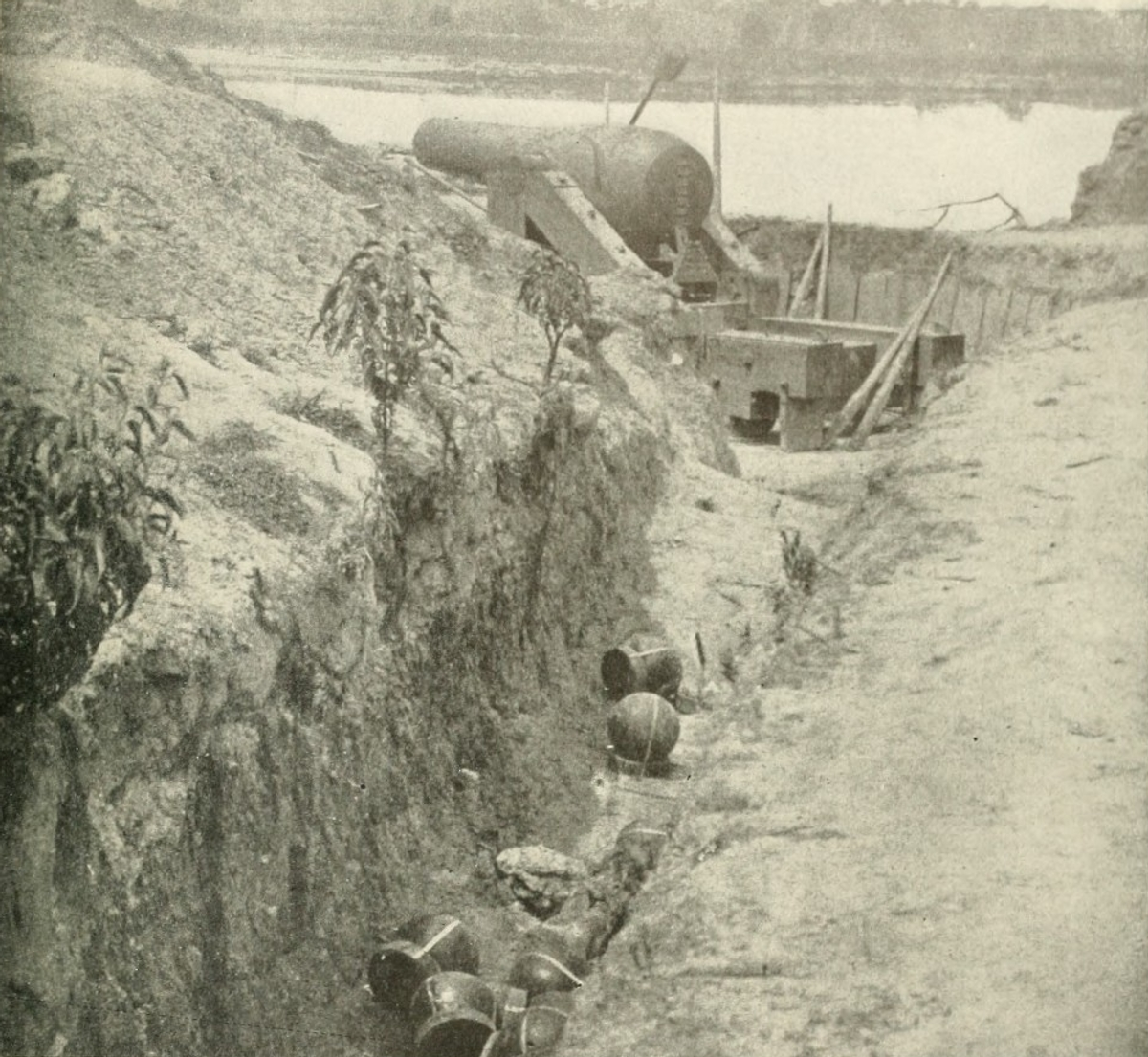
Confederate siege gun mounted in the river fortifications, 1863.

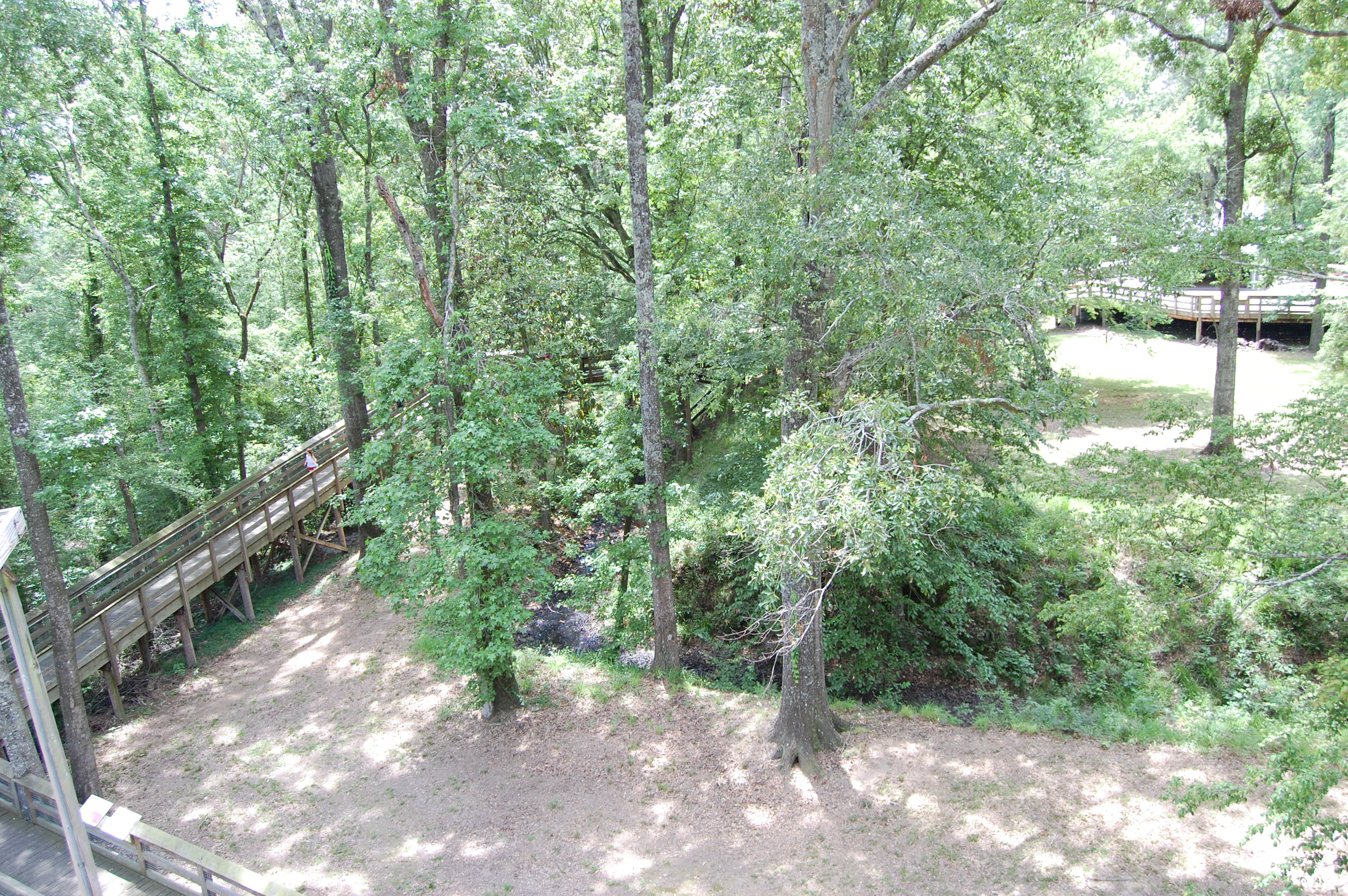
View of Fort Desperate from the observation tower.

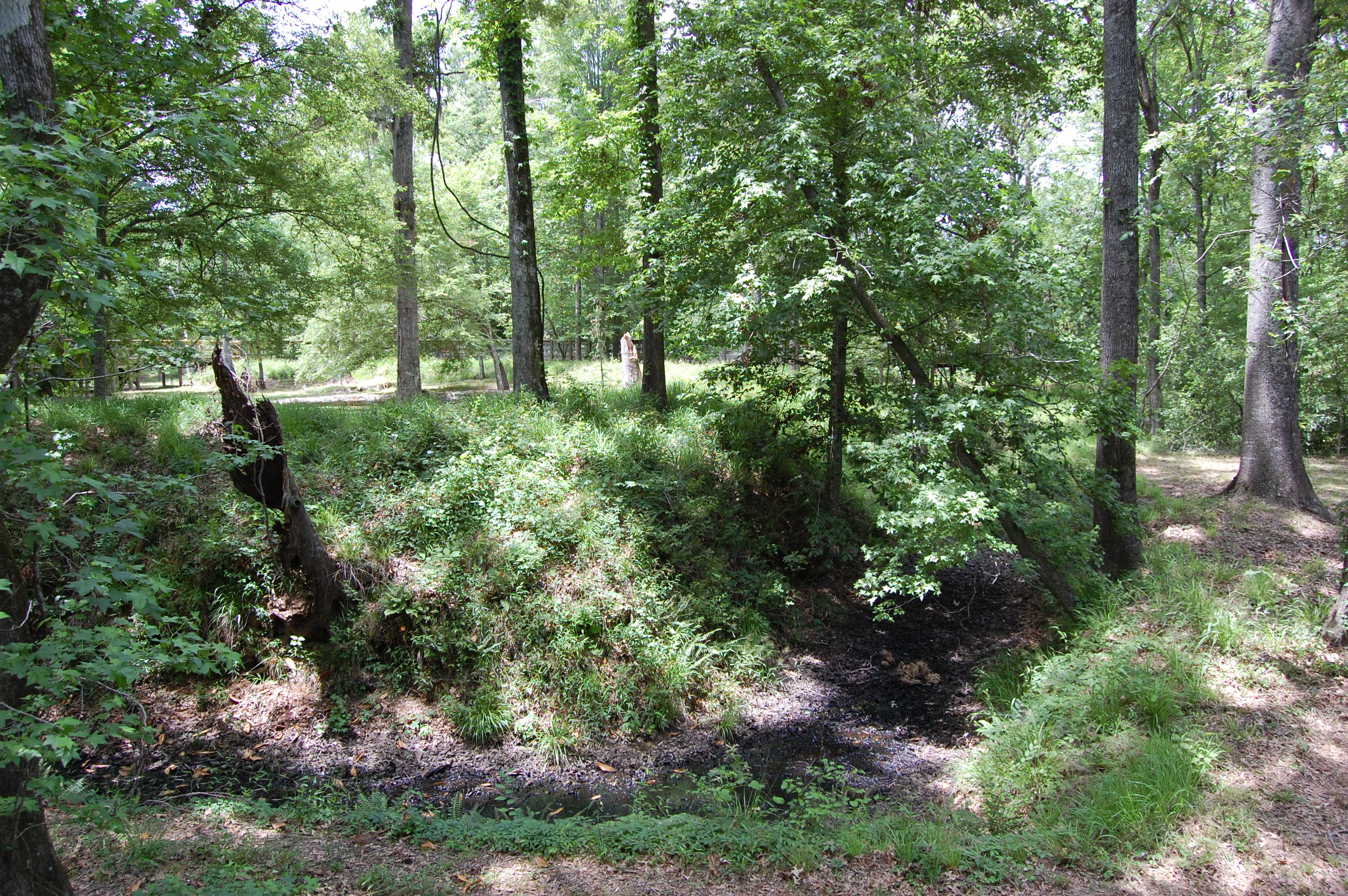
Outside the Fort Desperate earthworks looking west.

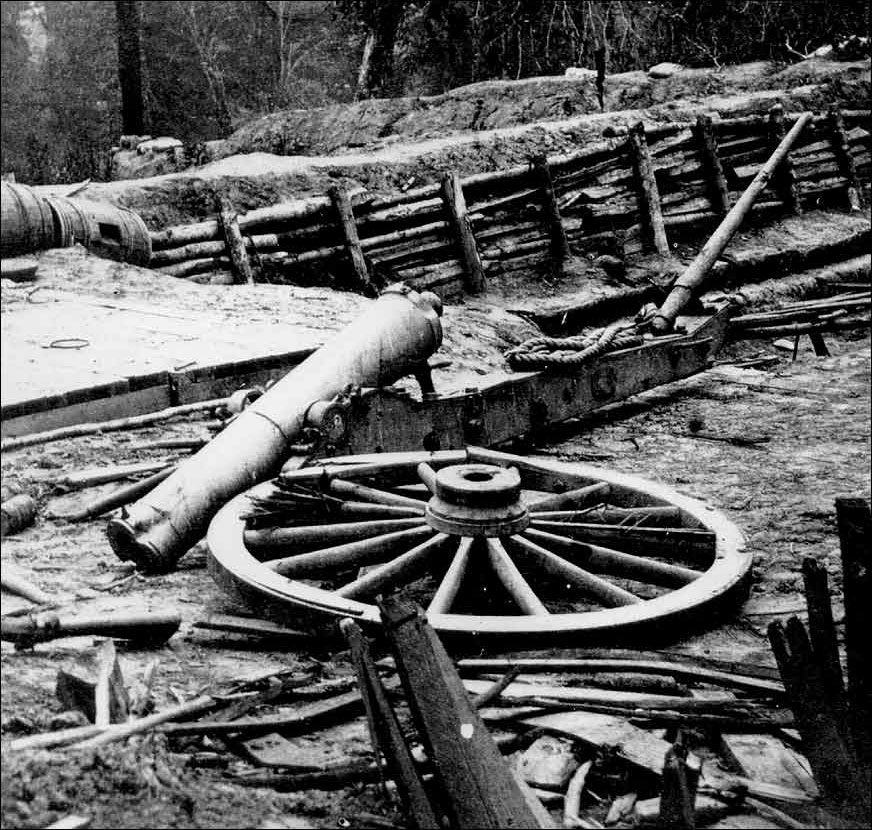
Fort Desperate, July 1863.

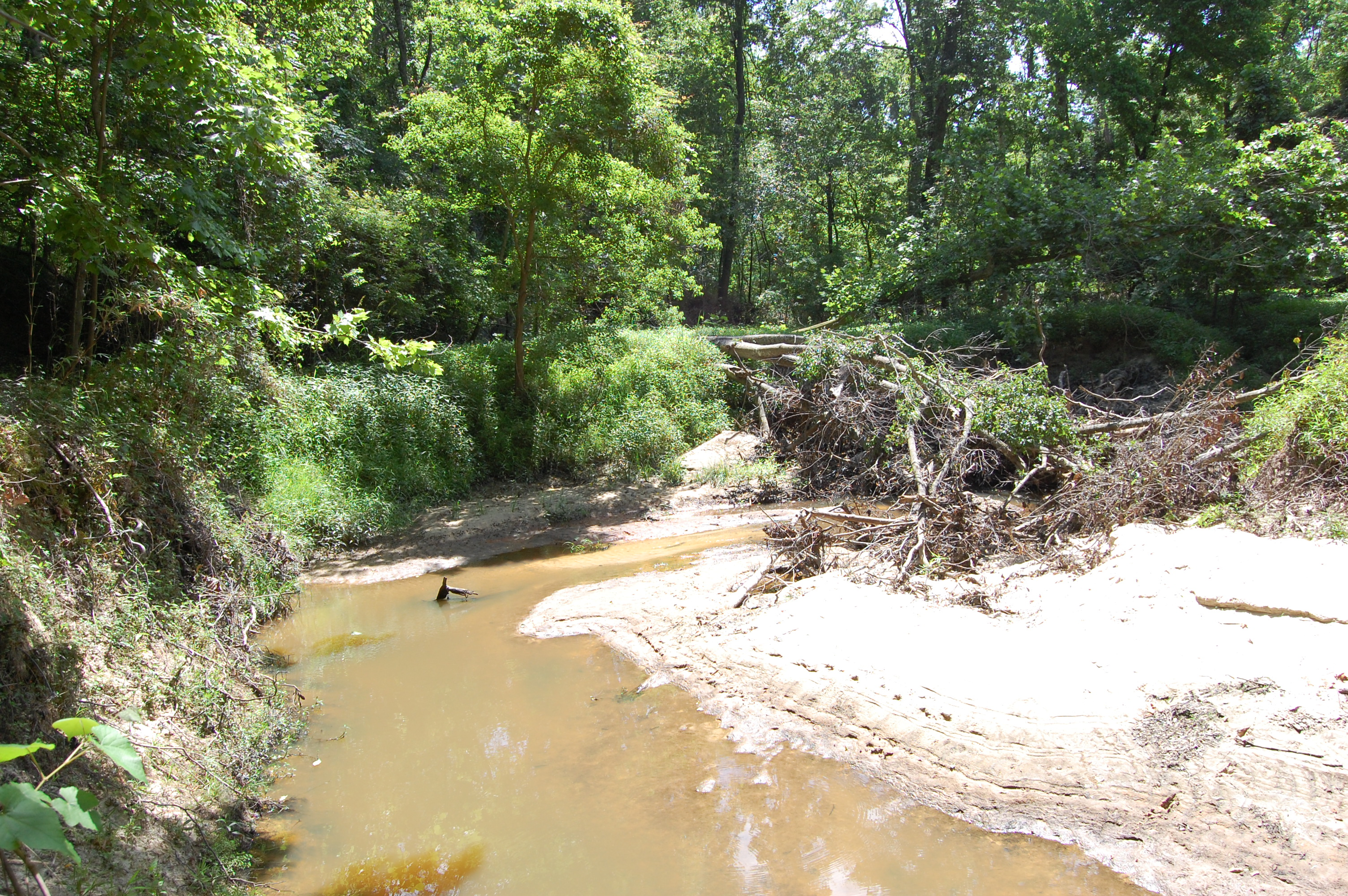
Foster Creek below Artillery Ridge looking west toward Fort Babcock.

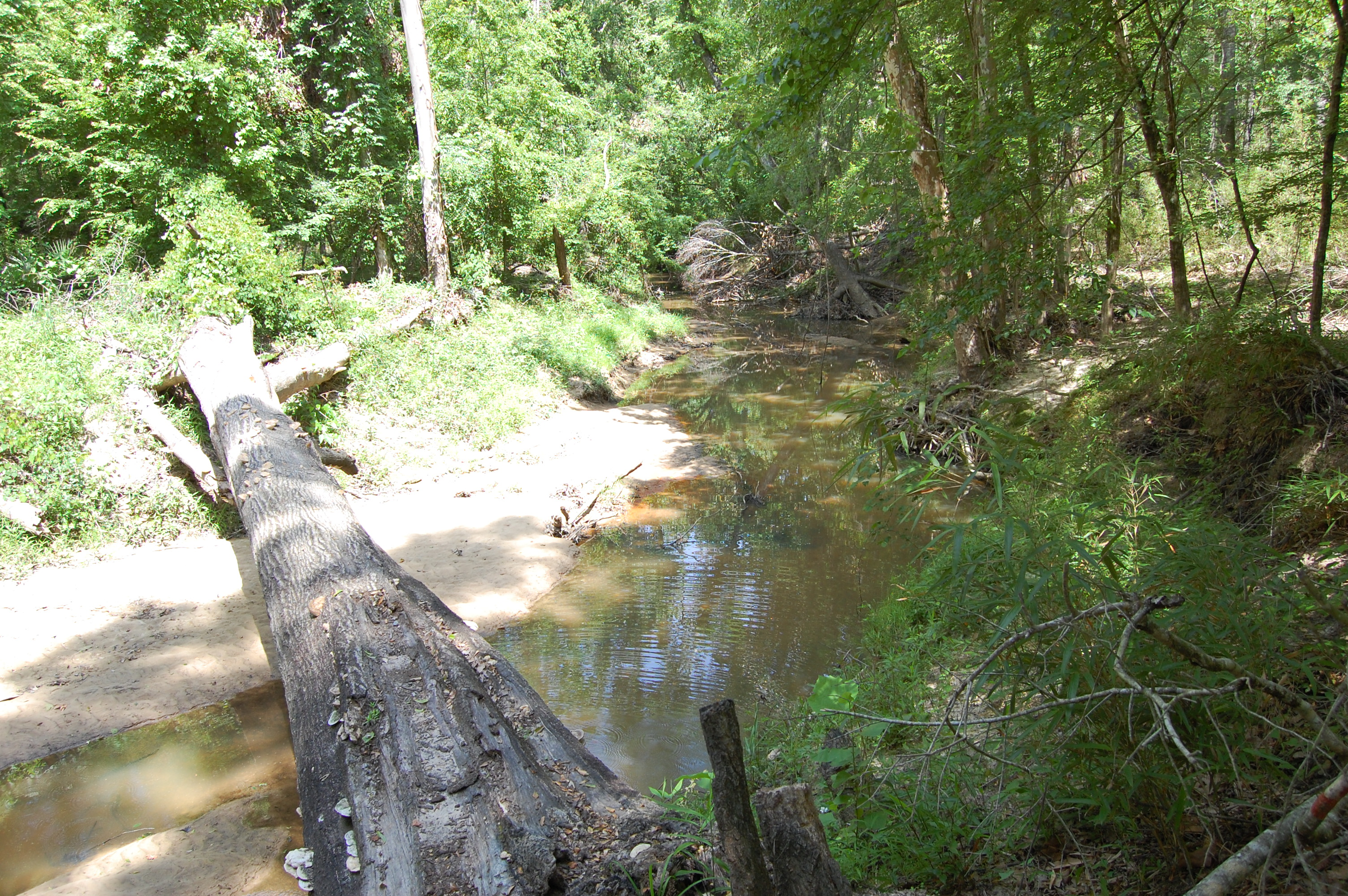
Foster Creek west of the Alabama-Arkansas Redoubt looking north toward Artillery Ridge.

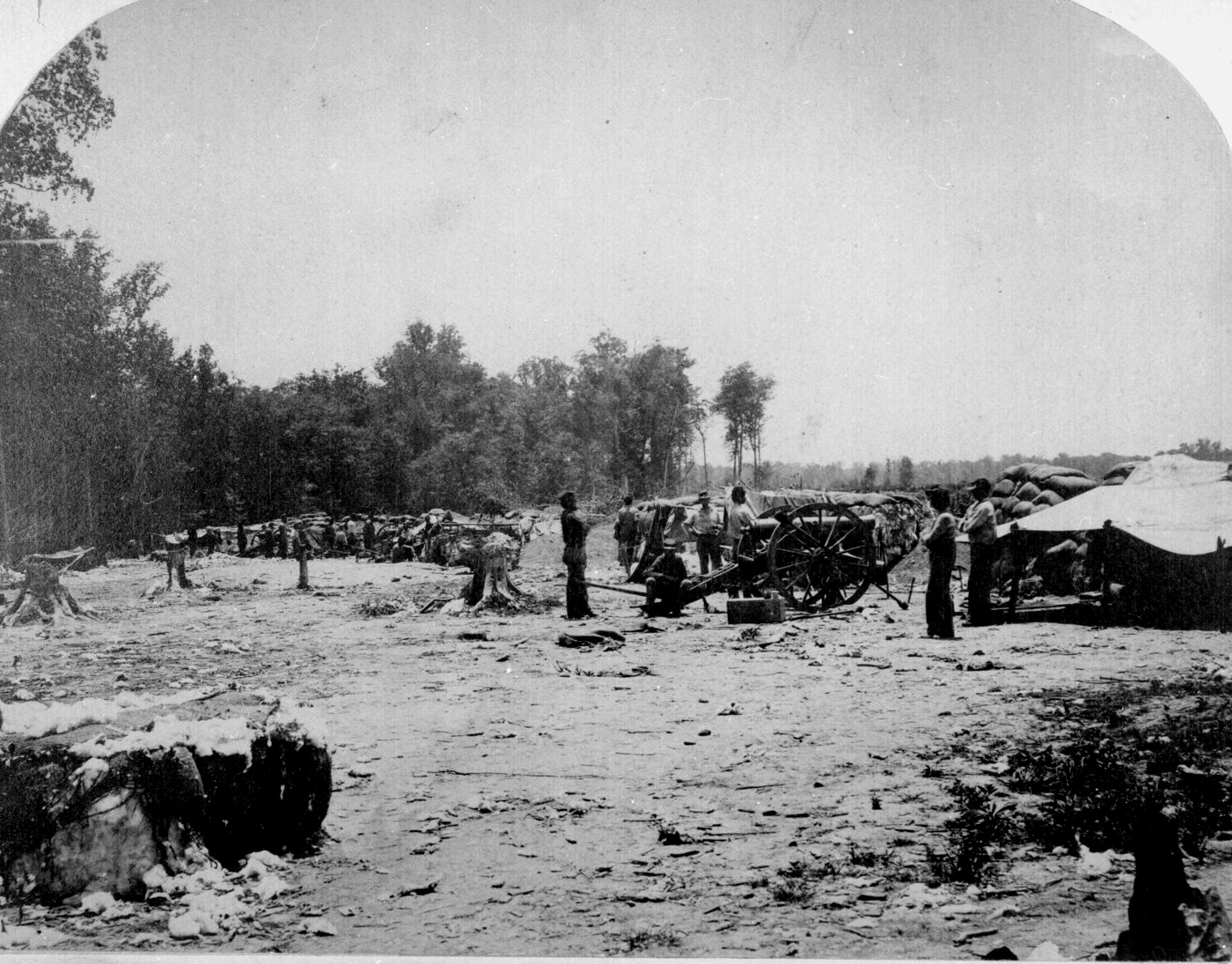
Captain Bainbridge's Battery A, 1st U.S. Artillery, 1863.

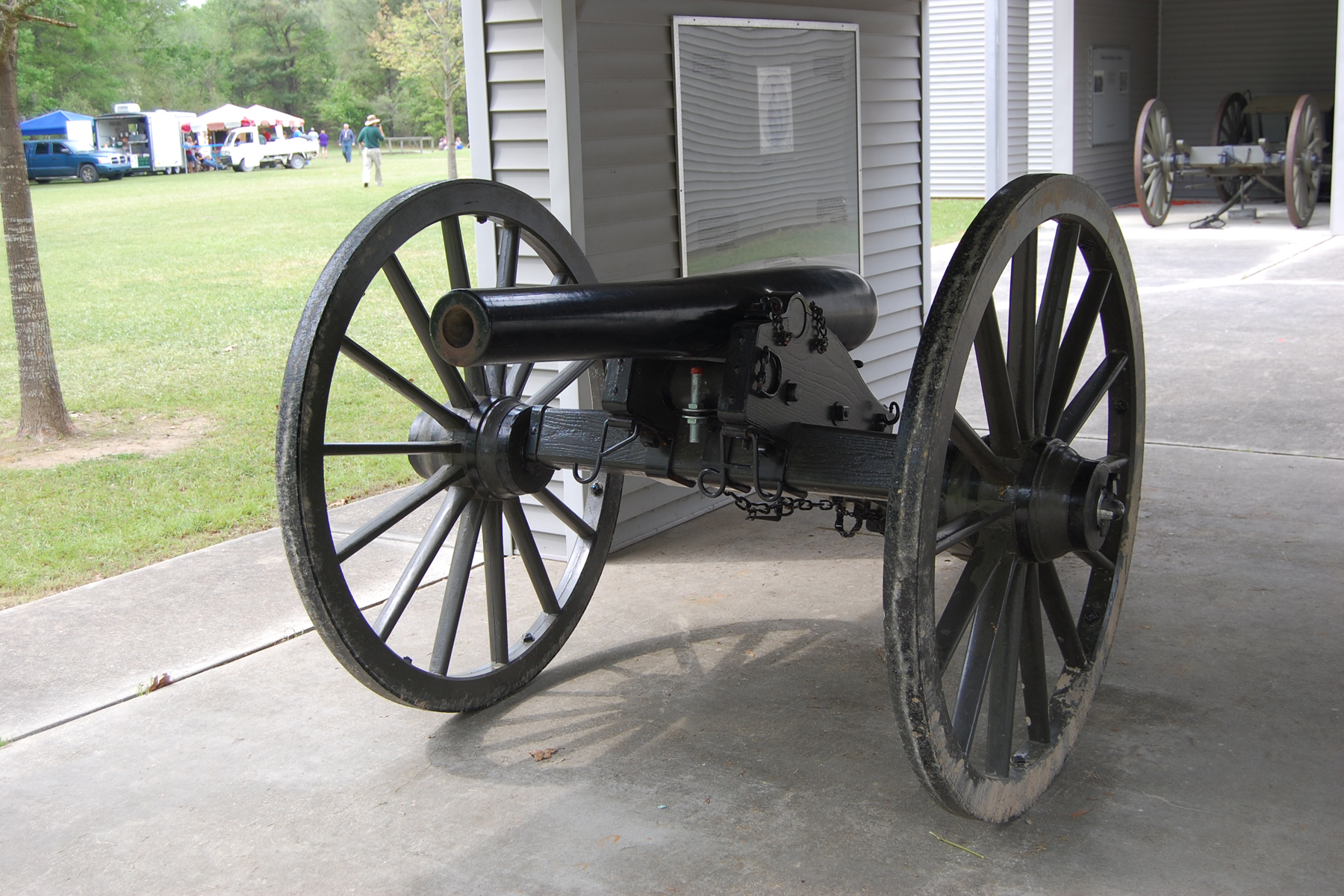
US Army 20-Pounder Parrott Rifle Model 1861.

== See also ==
- Siege of Port Hudson
- Port Hudson National Cemetery
- List of National Historic Landmarks in Louisiana
- National Register of Historic Places listings in East Feliciana Parish, Louisiana
- Audubon State Historic Site
- Locust Grove State Historic Site
- List of Louisiana state historic sites
