= Philip B. Larimore =

United States Army decorated soldier (1925-2003)

Philip "Phil" Bonham Larimore Jr. (January 4, 1925 – October 31, 2003) was a United States Army officer who served during World War II as the youngest commissioned Army officer. He participated in several key campaigns in the European Theater and received multiple military decorations for his service including the Distinguished Service Cross, two Silver Stars, two Bronze Stars, three Purple Hearts, and three Presidential Unit Citations. After his time in the Army, he became a professor of cartography at Louisiana State University (LSU). In civilian life, Larimore contributed to geographic education and community service.

== Early life and military training ==
Philip B. Larimore Jr. was born on January 4, 1925, in Memphis, Tennessee. He attended Gulf Coast Military Academy in Gulfport, Mississippi, beginning in the 9th grade at age 13. He graduated in May 1942 with honors from the advanced ROTC program. Subsequently, he enrolled in the U.S. Army’s Officer Candidate School (OCS) at Fort Benning, Georgia, completing the program on December 17, 1942, at the age of 17, making him the youngest graduate in history. Due to age restrictions, he received his commission as a second lieutenant on January 20, 1943, shortly after turning 18. He was awarded Boy Scouting’s highest rank of Eagle Scout two weeks after his Army commission.

After commissioning, Larimore was assigned as a platoon leader at Camp Wheeler, Georgia. He later joined the 326th Glider Infantry Regiment of the 82nd Airborne Division, where he served as a rifle platoon leader and held roles as Battalion S-1 and S-2 during training at Fort Bragg, North Carolina, Fort Benning, and Alliance Air Base, Nebraska. He underwent specialized training in airborne operations and demolitions, earning a Parachutist Badge, glider pilot wings, and certifications as a Demolition Expert and an Expert Rifle Sharpshooter. In January 1944, he transferred to the 3rd Infantry Division and deployed to Italy.

== World War II ==
=== Anzio and the Italian campaign ===
Larimore’s combat service began during the Anzio campaign in February 1944, where he commanded an ammunition and pioneer platoon tasked with fortifying front-line positions under enemy fire. He received a Silver Star for his actions in repelling German counterattacks near Cisterna di Littoria in March 1944. As part of the 30th Infantry Regiment, he earned a Combat Infantryman Badge and was promoted to first lieutenant. He also organized a mule-based supply delivery system to support front-line troops. Following the breakout from Anzio in May 1944, Larimore participated in the liberation of Rome, earning a Distinguished Unit Citation.

=== Operation Dragoon and the Vosges mountains ===
On August 15, 1944, Larimore’s unit participated in Operation Dragoon, the Allied invasion of southern France. He sustained an arm wound near Saint-Tropez, for which he received his first Purple Heart, and continued to serve without hospitalization. His actions during engagements in Provence, including river crossings under heavy fire, earned him a Bronze Star and a second Distinguished Unit Citation as part of Company L, 3rd Battalion, 30th Infantry Regiment. In the Vosges mountains, he reimplemented the mule-based supply system. In November 1944, he was wounded again, receiving a second Purple Heart, and recovered in a field hospital before rejoining his unit.

=== Colmar Pocket, company commander, Siegfried Line, and the Distinguished Service Cross ===
During the Colmar Pocket campaign in January and February 1945, Larimore served as a company commander of Company L, 30th Infantry Regiment, following the injury of the previous commander. His leadership during intense engagements, including the Battle for the Maison Rouge Bridge, earned him a second Bronze Star, a third Distinguished Unit Citation, the French Croix de Guerre with Palm, and the French Fourragère. He later fought through the Siegfried Line into Germany.

=== Operation Cowboy and the Lipizzaner rescue ===
In April 1945, Larimore participated in a top-secret mission to locate the Lipizzaner stallions hidden by German forces in Czechoslovakia. He confirmed the horses’ location at Hostau and identified several hundred POWs, contributing to the planning of Operation Cowboy, a rescue operation authorized by General George Patton to preserve the breed.

=== Final combat and injury ===
On April 8, 1945, near Rottershausen, Germany, Larimore led an assault against entrenched German positions. During the engagement, he operated a tank-mounted machine gun to rescue a surrounded squad, destroying multiple enemy positions. He was severely wounded by a sniper’s bullet, resulting in the amputation of his right leg. His actions earned him a second Silver Star, later upgraded to the Distinguished Service Cross, and a third Purple Heart. Larimore was promoted to captain in April 1945.

=== Post-injury service and advocacy ===
Larimore underwent rehabilitation at Lawson General Hospital in Atlanta, where he established an equine therapy program for recovering soldiers. Facing mandatory discharge due to Army policy on amputee officers, he served as Executive Officer of the Ceremonial Detachment at Fort Myer, Virginia, from May to November 1946, advocating for policy reform. Despite his efforts, supported by notable figures, he was discharged as a major on July 12, 1947. His advocacy contributed to a 1950 policy change allowing amputee officers to request continued service.

== Military Decorations ==
Larimore’s decorations include:

• Distinguished Service Cross
• Silver Star with Oak Leaf Clusters
• Bronze Star with Oak Leaf Cluster
• Purple Heart with two Oak Leaf Clusters
• Combat Infantry Badge
• Presidential Unit Citation with two Oak Leaf Clusters
• French Croix de Guerre with Palm
• French Fourragère
• European Theater of Operations Campaign Medal with Four Bronze Stars & Arrowhead
• American Campaign Medal
• World War II Victory Medal

== Post-War civilian career ==
After his discharge, Larimore earned degrees from the University of Virginia under the G.I. Bill. In 1954, he joined LSU’s Department of Geography & Anthropology, where he taught cartography for nearly five decades. He authored textbooks, founded the Louisiana Geography Bee, and contributed to geographic education. He also served as a scoutmaster for nearly four decades, receiving the Silver Beaver Award, and was active in the Episcopal Church, teaching Sunday school at St. Alban’s Chapel, on the LSU campus.

== Personal life ==
Larimore married Maxine Wilson in 1949, and they raised four sons, all of whom became Eagle Scouts. He died on October 31, 2003, and was interred at Port Hudson National Cemetery, despite a reserved plot at Arlington National Cemetery.

== Legacy ==
Larimore’s contributions are recognized through exhibits at the LSU William A. Brookshire Military Museum, the National WWII Museum in New Orleans, the National Infantry Museum and Soldier Center at Fort Benning, and the U.S. Army Heritage and Education Center in Carlisle, Pennsylvania. In 1997, he was inducted into the Hall of Honor by the Cadets of the Ole War Skule at LSU. In 2023, he was inducted into the 3rd Infantry Division’s Marne Hall of Fame and, in 2025, into the Army’s OCS Hall of Fame for Valorous Combat Leadership. The LSU Department of Geography & Anthropology maintains the Philip Larimore Memorial Fund to support geographic education.

A 2022 biography, At First Light: A True World War II Story of a Hero, His Bravery, and an Amazing Horse by Walter L. Larimore, one of his sons, and Mike Yorkey, received a 2022 Silver Medal from the Military Writers Society of America and was named the 2023 non-fiction book of the year by the International Page Turner Awards. At First Light was also a featured book at the 2024 Louisiana Book Festival.
