= Betty Heitman =

American Republican politician and political consultant

Co-Chair of the Republican National Committee
- In office 1983–1987
- Leader: Paul Laxalt (General Chair); Frank Fahrenkopf (National Chair)
- Succeeded by: Maureen Reagan

President of the National Federation of Republican Women
- In office 1978–1980
- Preceded by: Patricia Hutar
- Succeeded by: Betty Rendel

Personal details
- Born: November 27, 1929 Malvern, Arkansas, US
- Died: February 1, 1994 (aged 64) Baton Rouge, Louisiana
- Resting place: Port Hudson National Cemetery in Zachary, Louisiana
- Spouse(s): Henry Schrader Heitman, M.D. (died 1992)
- Children: 4
- Education: Texas Woman's University
- Occupation: Republican party official Political consultant

Betty Green Heitman (November 27, 1929 – February 1, 1994) was a Republican activist from Baton Rouge, Louisiana. From 1978 to 1980 she was president of the National Federation of Republican Women. During her tenure the organization achieved financial independence from the Republican National Committee in Washington, D.C. She also prodded U.S. Presidents Ronald W. Reagan and George Herbert Walker Bush to appoint more women to executive government offices.

== Background ==
Heitman was a native of Malvern in Hot Spring County, near Little Rock, Arkansas. She graduated in 1949 from Texas Woman's University in Denton in North Texas. In 1980, she was named a distinguished alumnus of the institution.

Heitman was married to Henry Schrader Heitman, M.D. (1923–1992), who had been a captain in the United States Army Air Forces during World War II. The couple had four children, among them, Thomas H. Heitman (born 1956) of Oakton in Fairfax County, Virginia, and Paul Anderson Heitman (born 1961) of Denham Springs in Livingston Parish, Louisiana.

== Political life ==
Heitman was a delegate to the 1968 and 1976 Republican national conventions held in Miami Beach, Florida, and Kansas City, Missouri, to nominate Richard M. Nixon and Gerald R. Ford Jr., respectively.

As the president of the National Federation of Republican Women, Heitman worked to establish two schools for training within the organization, one for campaign management and the other for political polling. The NFRW established in her honor the biennial Betty Heitman Award for State Excellence. All of the NFRW presidents rose from the ranks of state federations. From 1996 to 1997, another Louisiana Republican, Marilyn Thayer of New Orleans, served as the NFRW president.

After her NFRW presidency, Heitman was the co-chairwoman of the Republican National Committee under chairman Frank J. Fahrenkopf Jr. Recommended as co-chair by President Ronald Reagan, the conservative Republican Heitman served from 1983-1987. In her first year she convened meetings of female party activists in a program called "Target '80s" to encourage candidates to seek office in 1984, when Reagan would be running for a second term as president. At a leadership forum in Philadelphia, she said, " I feel we have not done as good a job as we could to arm our women leaders with as much information as they need at the grassroots level. We hope these meetings will help them gear up for the 1984 campaign."

After her party co-chairmanship, Reagan appointed Heitman in 1987 to succeed Kenneth Duberstein on the Commission for the Preservation of America's Heritage Abroad. She was also designated as the chairman of the commission.

During the administration of U. S. President George Herbert Walker Bush, Heitman was a member of the Committee on Executive Exchange, which sought to enhance relations between business and government with an exchange of executives. When that effort was abandoned in 1991, Heitman returned to Baton Rouge.

While in Washington, D.C., and residing mostly in Arlington, Virginia, she established her own consulting firm, the Heitman Group, which lobbied on behalf of international marketing interests, among other interests.

Heitman is interred with her husband at the Port Hudson National Cemetery, a National Historic Landmark in Zachary in East Baton Rouge Parish.

In 1996, Heitman was inducted posthumously into the Louisiana Center for Women and Government Hall of Fame at Nicholls State University in Thibodaux, along with another Baton Rouge political figure, the Democrat former State Representative Lillian W. Walker.

Party political offices
Preceded by Patricia Hutar of Illinois	President of the National Federation of Republican Women; 1978–1980	Succeeded by Betty Rendel of Indiana
Preceded by Paul Laxalt	Co-chairman of the Republican National Committee; 1983–1987	Succeeded by Maureen Reagan
