= Port Hudson National Cemetery =

Historic veterans cemetery in East Baton Rouge Parish, Louisiana

- U.S. National Register of Historic Places
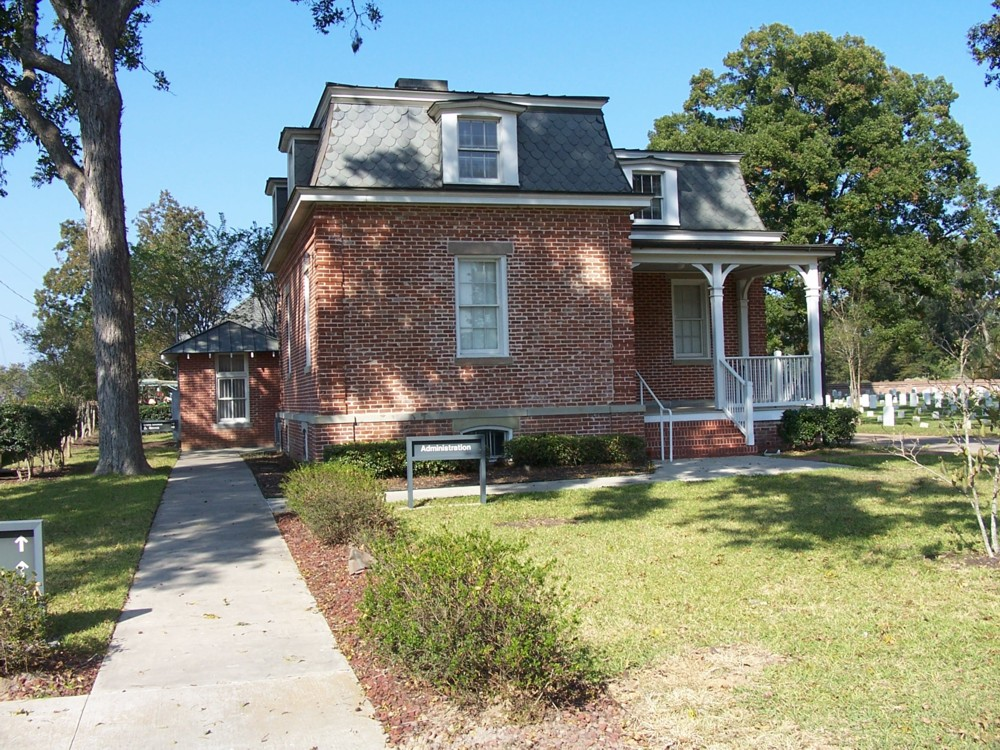
- Cemetery Administration building

- Location within Louisiana Location within the United States
- Location: 20978 Port Hickey Road, Zachary, East Baton Rouge Parish, Louisiana
- Nearest city: Port Hudson, Louisiana
- Coordinates: 30°39′40″N 91°16′30″W
- Area: 19.9 acres (8.1 ha)
- Built: 1867
- Architect: Montgomery C. Meigs
- Architectural style: Second Empire
- MPS: Civil War Era National Cemeteries MPS
- NRHP reference No.: 99000591
- Added to NRHP: May 20, 1999

Port Hudson National Cemetery is a United States National Cemetery located in Port Hudson, 20 miles (32 km) north of the city of Baton Rouge in East Baton Rouge Parish, Louisiana. Administered by the United States Department of Veterans Affairs, it encompasses 19.9 acres (8.1 ha), and as of the end of 2020, had over 12,000 interments.

== History ==
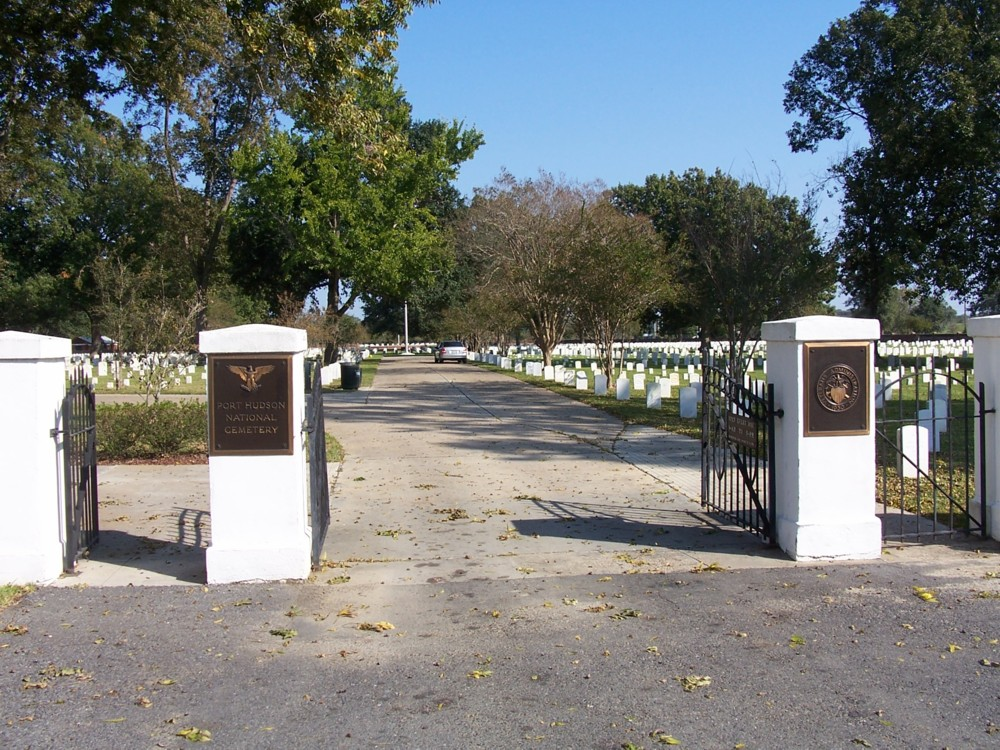
Cemetery main gate

The cemetery is located on the site which was the main battleground of the Siege of Port Hudson, during the American Civil War. Nearly 4,000 Union troops fell during the fighting, and most were buried in the cemetery, many as unknowns. After the war another 8.4 acres (3.4 ha) was appropriated to inter those who died in the local veterans' facilities. The battle was notable for valiant fighting by the 1st and 3rd Regiments of the Louisiana Native Guards, troops composed of free men of color from the New Orleans area and a majority of African Americans who had escaped from slavery to join the cause and gain freedom.

The Confederate soldiers who died were primarily buried in the trenches where they fell. A Confederate Cemetery was later established in the Port Hudson area; it is not accessible to the public.

The battlefield at Port Hudson is one of the few naturally preserved Civil War battlegrounds. The breastworks, gun pits, and trenches remain today almost as they were during the battle. The area has never been developed.

Port Hudson National Cemetery 19.9 acres (8.1 ha) area, comprising a total of 9 contributing resources, was listed on the National Register of Historic Places on May 20, 1999; a different portion of the battlefield, several miles to the north, is preserved in the Port Hudson State Historic Site. That area is designated a National Historic Landmark.

== Notable burials ==
- John Ferguson, sportscaster for the LSU Tigers
- Frank Fields, double bass player
- Betty Heitman, co-chairman of the Republican National Committee from 1983 to 1987, buried with her husband, Captain Henry Schrader Heitman
- Maj. Philip B. Larimore, youngest commissioned and much decorated infantry officer in World War II.
- Tabby Thomas, blues musician

== See also ==
- National Register of Historic Places listings in East Baton Rouge Parish, Louisiana
- List of cemeteries in Louisiana
