= Audubon State Historic Site =

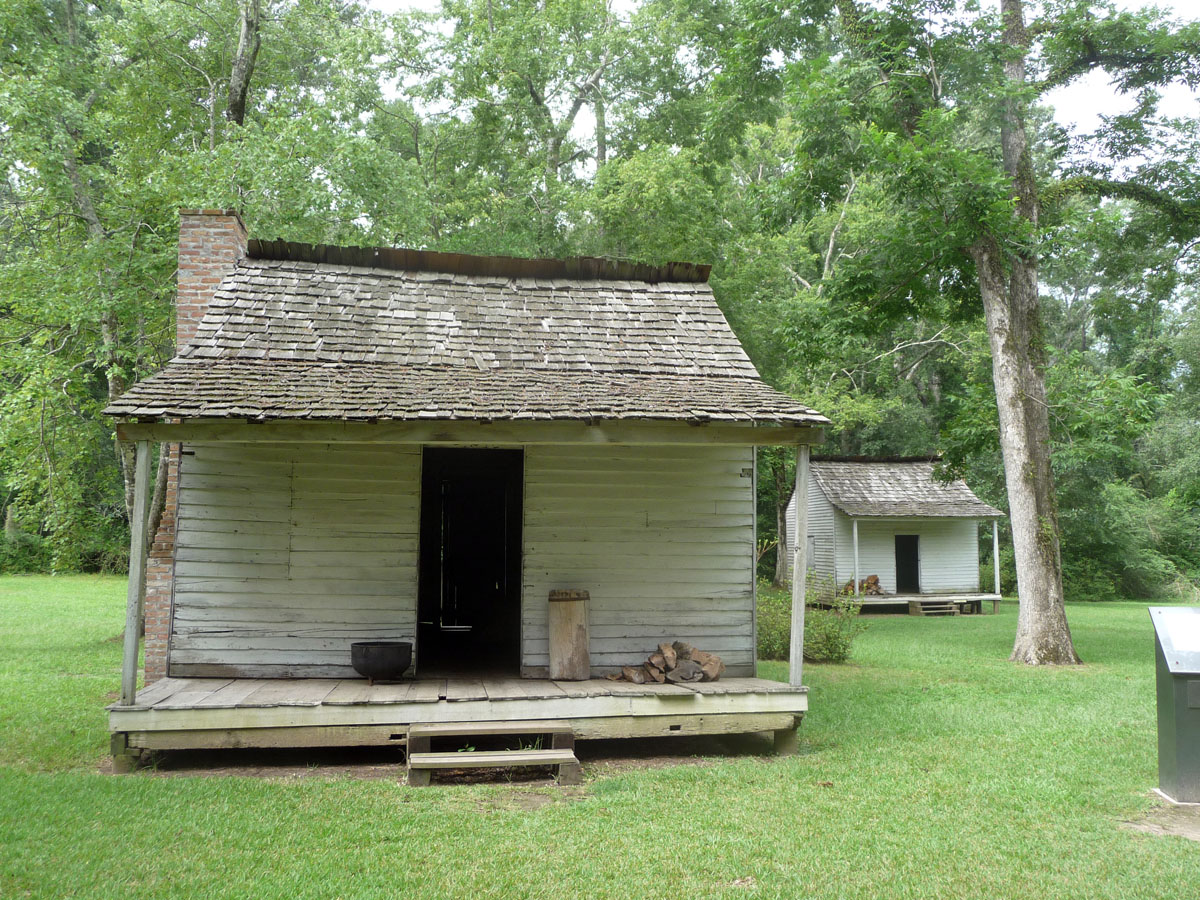
- Slave cabins at the site.

- Location within Louisiana
- Location: St. Francisville, Louisiana, United States of America
- Coordinates: 30.801885°N 91.31444°W
- Governing body: Louisiana Office of State Parks
- Website: Official web page

Audubon State Historic Site is a state park property in West Feliciana Parish, Louisiana, between the towns of St. Francisville and Jackson. It is the location where noted ornithologist and artist John James Audubon spent the summer of 1821.

Visitors come to see Oakley Plantation house, where Audubon lived at the time, and the surrounding plantation grounds. A portion of the 100-acre (0.40 km^{2}) site contains the forest which served as a setting for many of the 32 Birds of America paintings that Audubon created or began while at Oakley.

== Plantation house ==
Built circa 1806, the Oakley Plantation house is an example of early Anglo-American architecture in Louisiana, located on its historic site. Its interior rooms have been renovated in the style of the Federal period.

Audubon spent four months at the home in 1821, teaching Eliza Pirrie, the teen-aged daughter of the plantation's owners James Pirrie and Lucretia "Lucy" Alston (Pirrie), to draw. This is when he completed his nature drawings on the site.

The house was placed on the National Register of Historic Places in 1973 for its historical significance.

== Photo gallery ==
Audubon State Historic Site
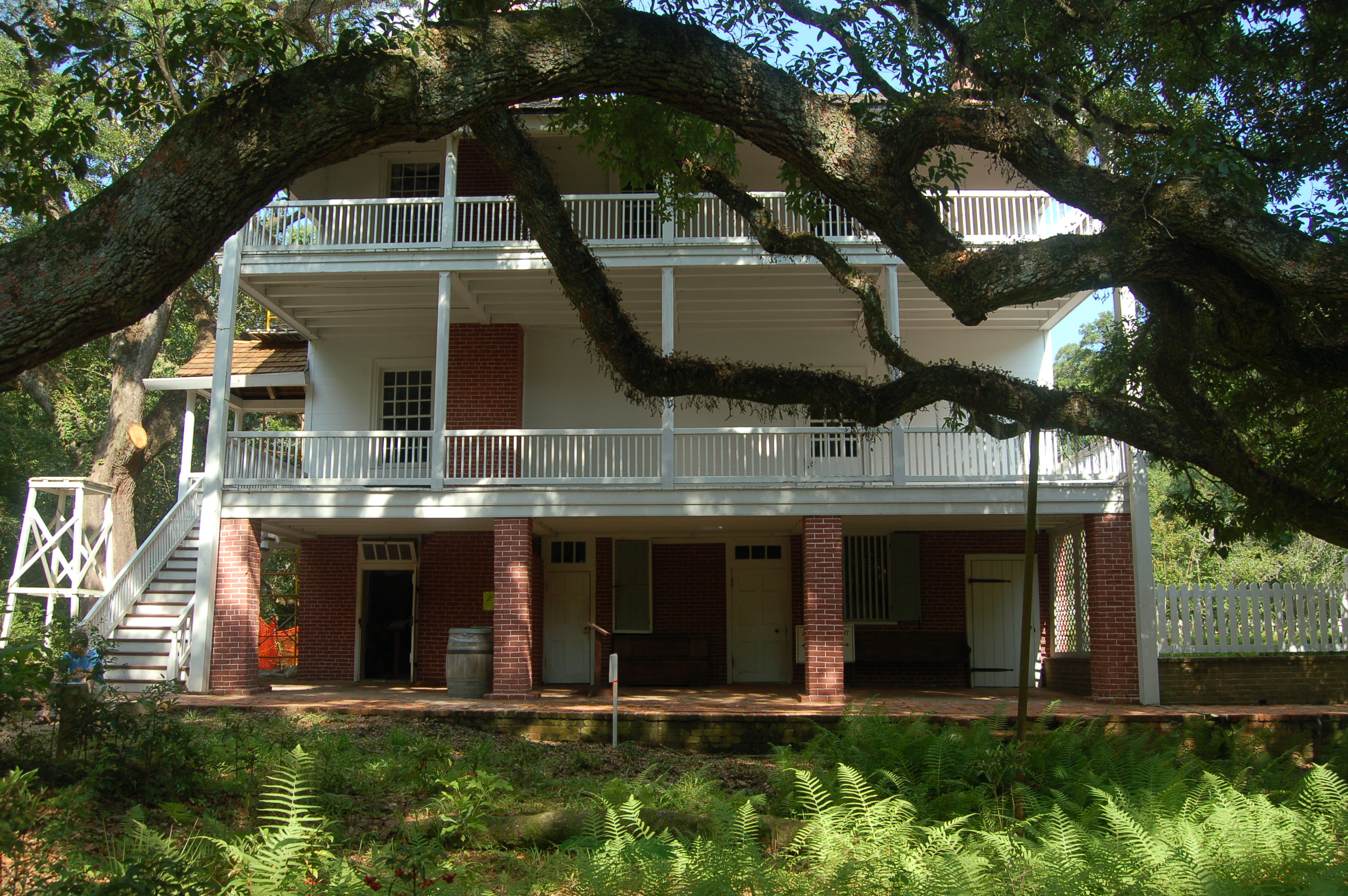
Rear view of Oakley Plantation house

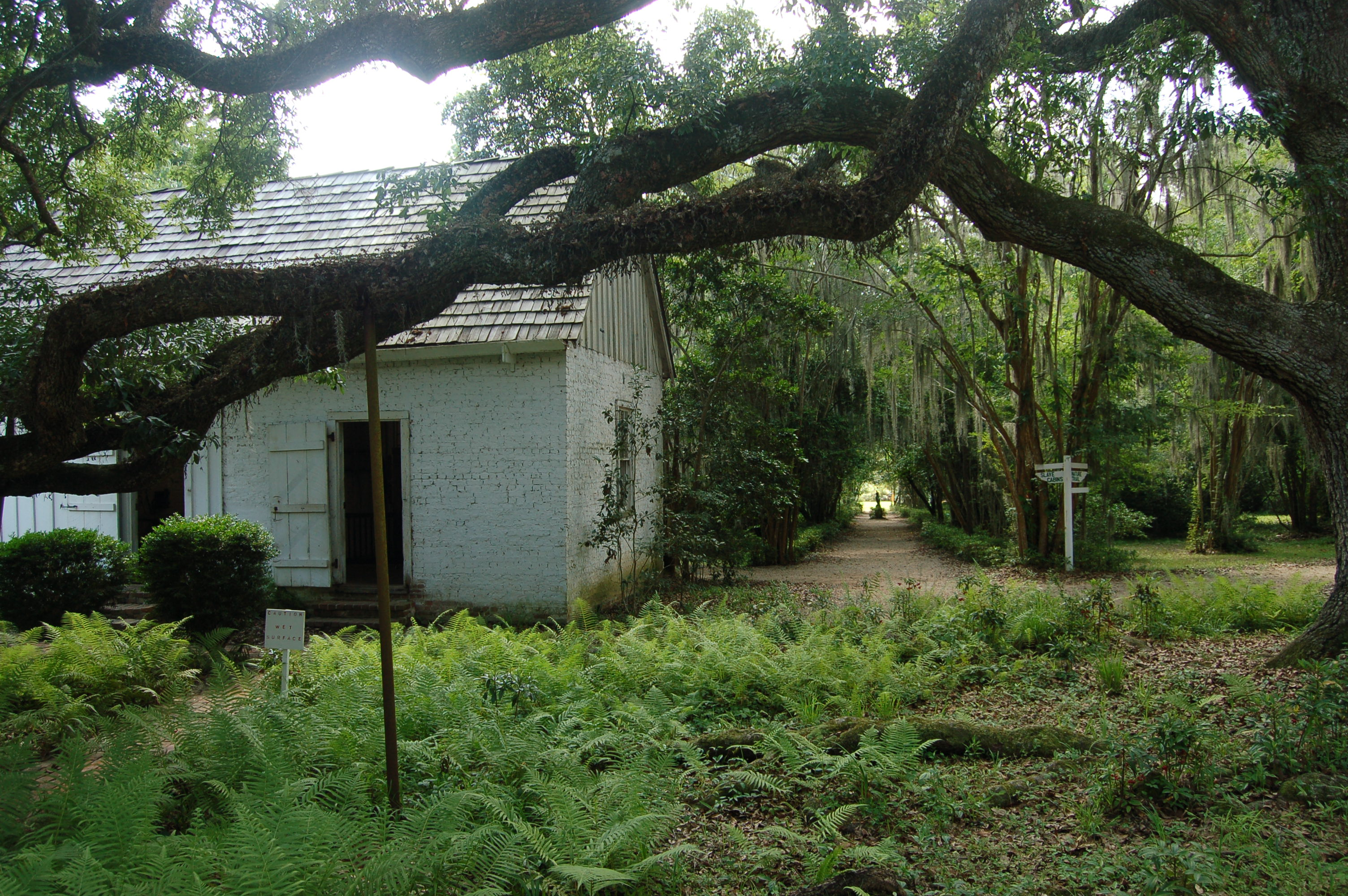
Back yard of the house

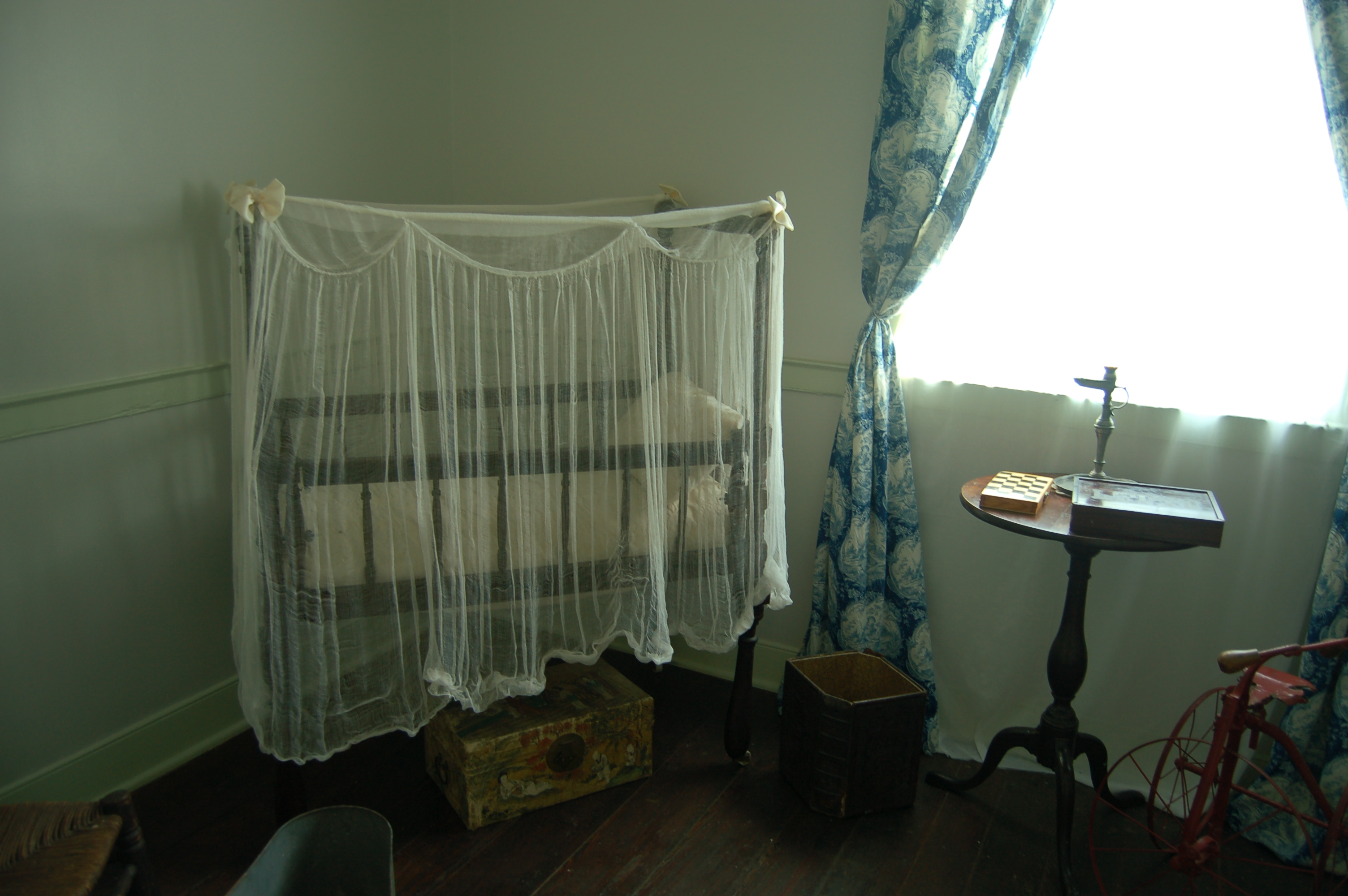
Children's room in the home

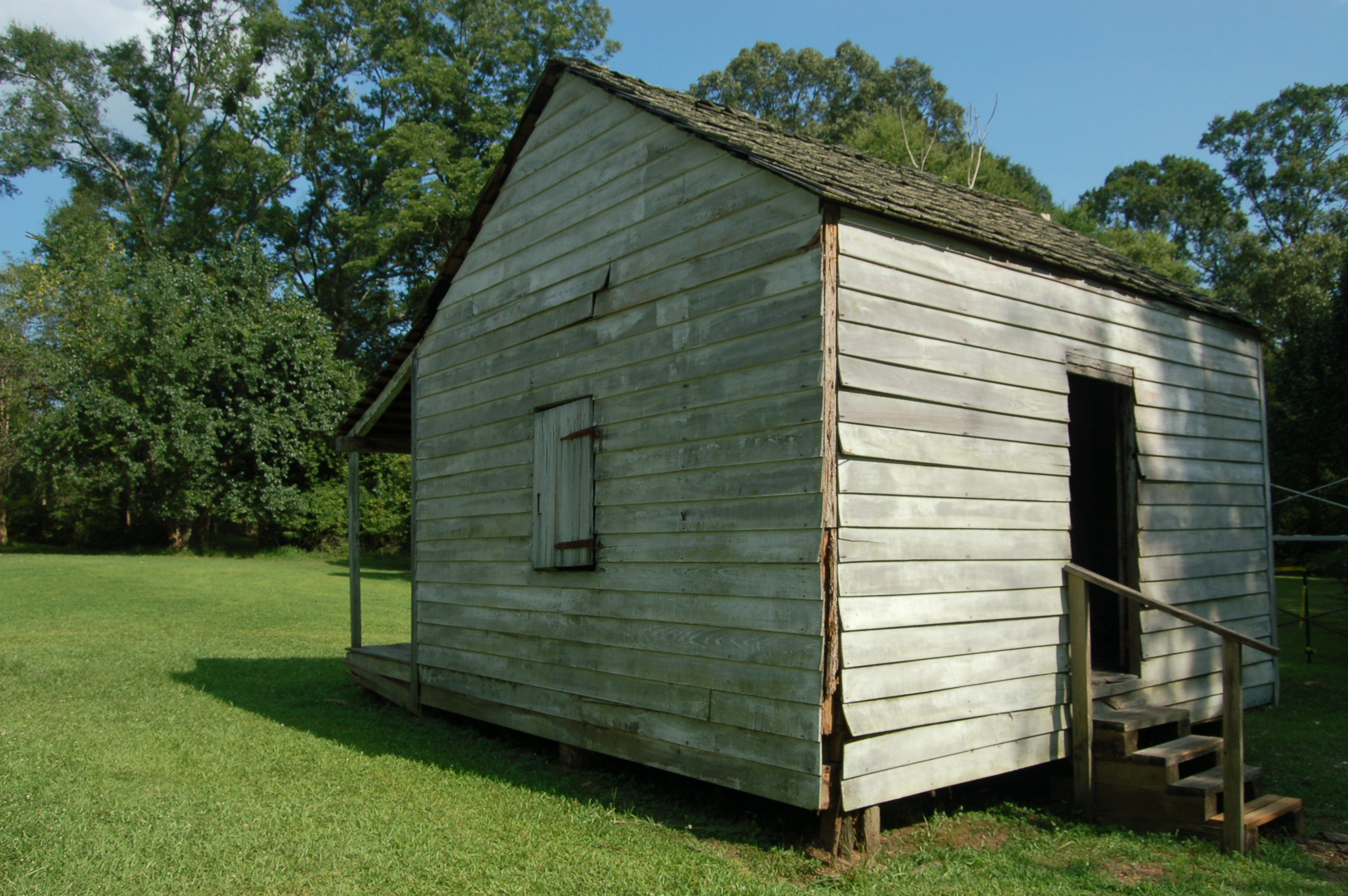
Slave cabin on the grounds

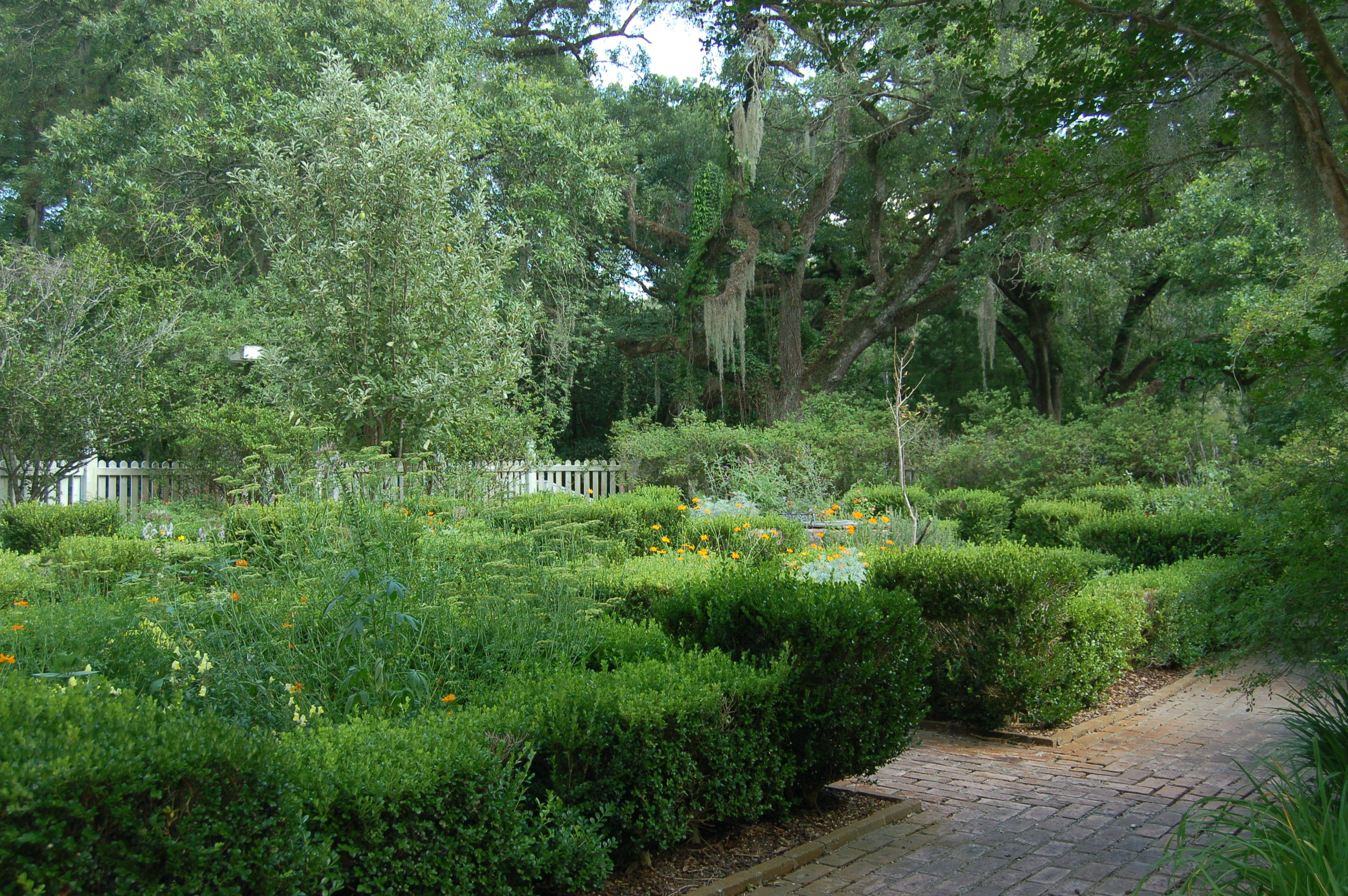
Oakley Plantation gardens

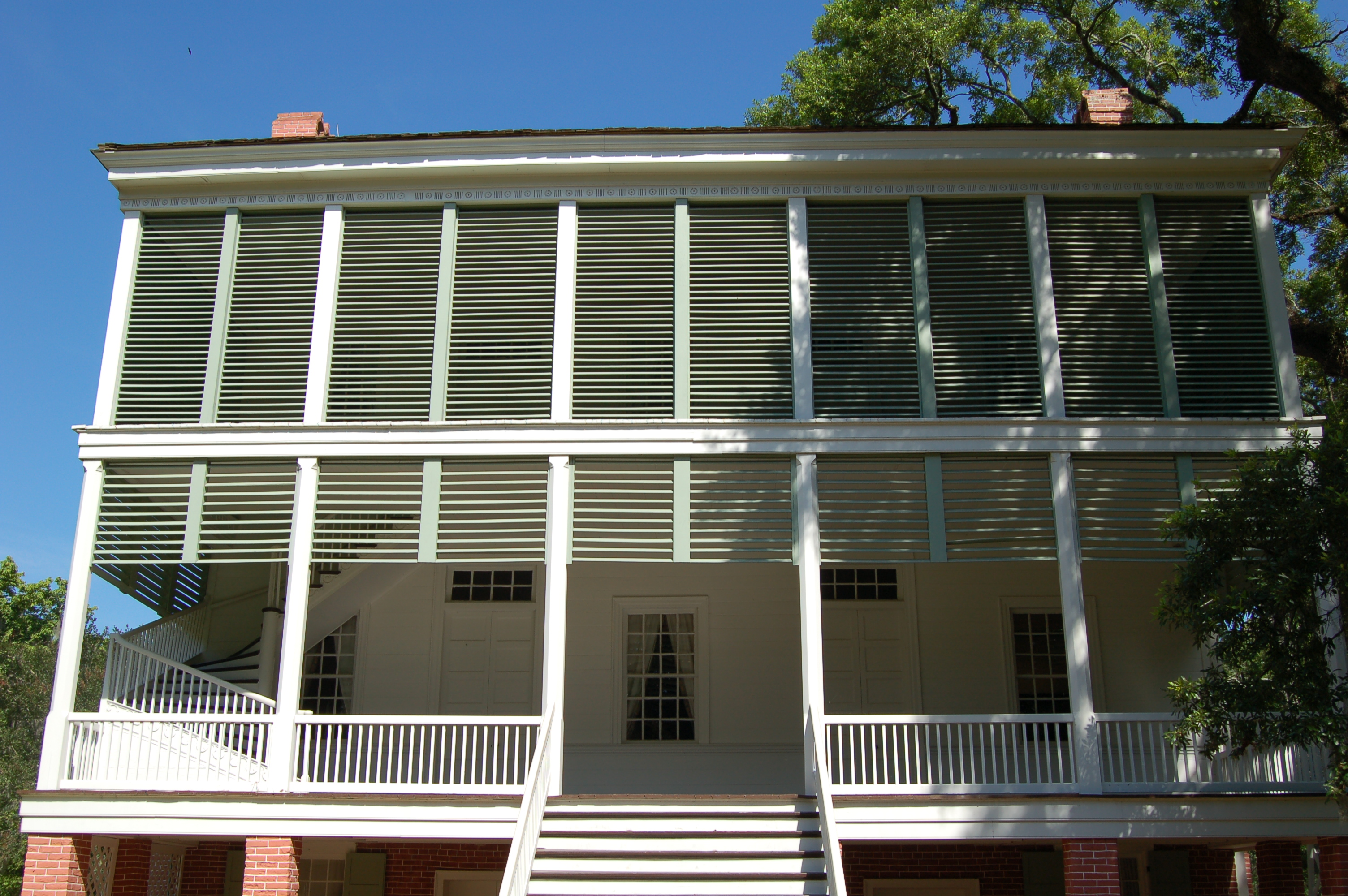
Front view of Oakley Plantation house

== See also ==
- National Register of Historic Places listings in West Feliciana Parish, Louisiana
- Locust Grove State Historic Site
- Rosedown Plantation State Historic Site
- List of Louisiana state historic sites
