= South and West =

2017 non-fiction book by Joan Didion

South and West: From a Notebook
- Authors: Joan Didion
- Language: English
- Subject: Southern United States; California
- Genre: Non-fiction
- Publisher: Alfred A. Knopf
- Publication date: March 2017
- Pages: 160
- ISBN: 978-1-5247-3279-0

South and West: From a Notebook is a 2017 non-fiction book authored by Joan Didion, with a preface by Nathaniel Rich. It is based on notes Didion took while traveling in Mississippi, Alabama and Louisiana in the 1970s as well as her sense of home in California.

== Summary ==
Didion recounts her road trip through the Southeastern United States, followed by her childhood memories of California triggered by the abduction of Patty Hearst.

== Critical reception ==
In a review for The Guardian, Peter Conrad noted that Didion describes the South to "a metaphorical landscape, America’s heart of darkness"; "colonial, obsessed with disparities of “race, class, heritage”"; and its wilderness as "rank, malevolent, encroaching everywhere." As for California, Conrad highlights, "the ground is abandoned altogether by blissed-out, irreligiously mystical individuals."

In The Atlantic, Megan Garber wrote that the book was "an act of radical humility—an offering of literary detente from a writer who so perfected the art of secret bullying."

Reviewing it for The New York Times, author Laila Lalami notes, "There is no plot in “South and West,” or conflict, or ending. The pleasures of this short book, rather, are found in observing the South through Didion's eyes."
