= John Smith (Virginia representative) =

American planter and politician (1750–1836)

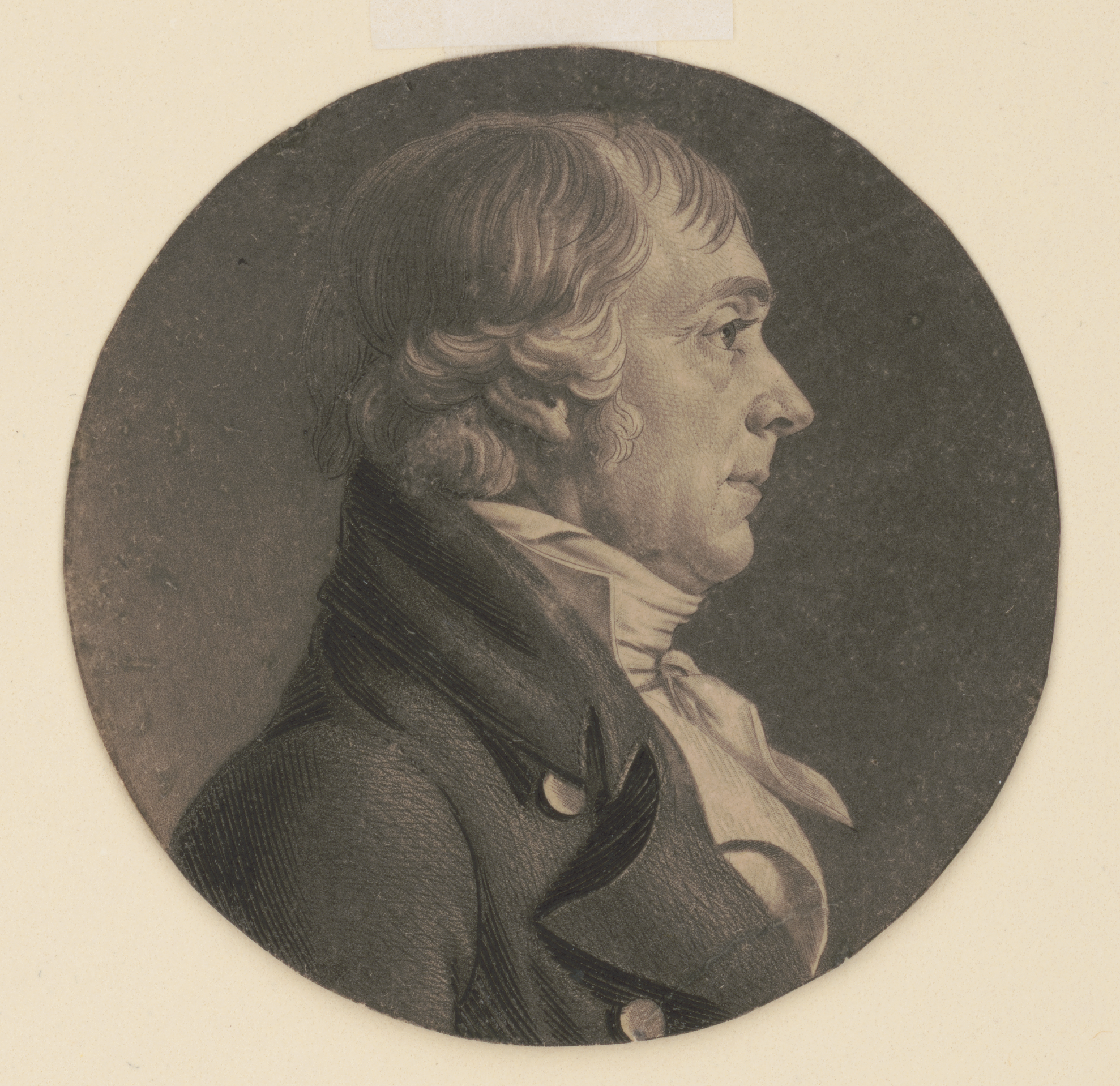

Member of the U.S. House of Representatives from Virginia
- In office March 4, 1801 – March 3, 1815
- Preceded by: Robert Page (1st); George Jackson (3rd)
- Succeeded by: John G. Jackson (1st); Henry S. Tucker (3rd)
- Constituency: 1st district (1801-03); 3rd district (1803-15)

Member of the Virginia Senate from Frederick, Berkeley, Hampshire and Hardy Counties
- In office Oct. 17, 1791–Nov. 10, 1794
- Preceded by: Robert Rutherford
- Succeeded by: Hugh Holmes

Member of the Virginia House of Delegates from Frederick County
- In office Oct. 14, 1786-Oct. 14, 1787 Serving with Charles Mynn Thruston
- In office May 5, 1777–May 1, 1780 Serving with Isaac Zane

Personal details
- Born: May 7, 1750 Locust Hill, Virginia Colony, British America
- Died: March 5, 1836 (aged 85) near Middletown, Virginia, U.S.
- Resting place: Mount Hebron Cemetery
- Party: Democratic-Republican
- Spouse: Animus Ball
- Children: John and Augustine
- Profession: planter

Military service
- Allegiance: United Kingdom; United States of America
- Branch/service: Virginia Militia
- Battles/wars: Dunmore's War; American Revolutionary War; War of 1812

John Smith (May 7, 1750 – March 5, 1836) was a Virginia planter and politician who served in both houses of the Virginia General Assembly as well as the United States House of Representatives.

== Early and family life ==
Smith was born in 1750 at Shooter's Hill, near Locust Hill in Middlesex County in the Colony of Virginia to parents Captain John Smith (1715–1771) and Mary Jaquelin (1714–1764). He also raised his orphaned nephew, Augustine Jacquelin Smith, who was educated as a physician but did not practice that profession, instead becoming a planter after reaching legal age to inherit his father's 'Ravensworth' plantation, and serving several distinct terms in the Virginia House of Delegates representing Fairfax County.

John Smith married Animus (Anna) Bull, daughter of General John Bull of Northumberland County, Pennsylvania, and they had at least three daughters and two sons who reached adulthood. His son Augustine C. Smith (1789-1843) would also serve with distinction as a U.S. Army officer (in the War of 1812, promoted from the rank of major to colonel) and then presided over a school in Winchester as well as won election to the Virginia Senate (representing Frederick and Jefferson Counties 1827-1831). His son John B. D. Smith served in the Virginia House of Delegates. His grandson, Col. Archibald Magill Smith would continue the family's martial tradition as a Confederate cavalry captain, although several of his cousins became doctors and moved to Missouri before the conflict. His daughter Eliza Barnwell Smith married prominent architect Robert Mills. His granddaughter Mary Powell Mills married Creole diplomat Alexander Dimitry.

== Career ==
Smith moved westward to Frederick County, Virginia in 1773 and became a planter. By 1777 he built a manor house he called "Hackwood", near the county seat at Winchester. He was commissioned a justice of the peace in 1773, and the county lieutenant in 1777.

Smith also served in the local militia and fought in Dunmore's War with the Indians in 1774. During the American Revolutionary War he was commissioned as colonel and served under generals Daniel Morgan and Muhlenburg). During the War of 1812, Smith was a major general of the state militia, though his son Augustine C. Smith actually encountered British troops.

Frederick County voters first elected Smith as one of their two representatives in the House of Delegates beginning in 1777, where he served alongside Isaac Zane and was re-elected twice but was replaced by Joseph Holmes in 1780. Smith again won election in 1786, serving alongside veteran Charles Mynn Thruston, but failed to win re-election, being replaced by John Shearman Woodcock. Nonetheless, Smith ran for the state Senate, and won election from the district comprising Frederick County and neighboring Berkeley, Hampshire and Hardy counties to the west, and served from 1791 until 1794.

In 1800 Smith ran for Congress as a Democratic-Republican and was elected to the Seventh and to the six succeeding Congresses (March 4, 1801 – March 3, 1815), although the name of his district changed following the 1800 census from the 1st to the 3rd Virginia congressional district.

After retiring from Congress, Smith resumed farming, probably using enslaved labor. Although the 1787 tax census lists several men of the same common name, only one of whom owed (2) slaves, this John Smith is probably the man who owned 26 slaves in Frederick County in 1810 and not the other two men of the same name and county who owned no slaves. In 1820, John Smith owned 17 slaves near Middletown in Frederick County. In the last census before his death, John Smith and his wife owned six slaves.

== Death and legacy ==
Smith died at "Rockville", near Middletown in Frederick County on March 5, 1836. He was interred in the family burying ground at Hackwood, near Winchester. "Hackwood" became a hospital for Union troops in the American Civil War, but burned in the Third Battle of Winchester, as a modern historical marker placed about a mile away notes. In 1890, Smith was reinterred at the historic Mount Hebron Cemetery. Hackwood Farms now concentrates on organic farming.

== Electoral history ==
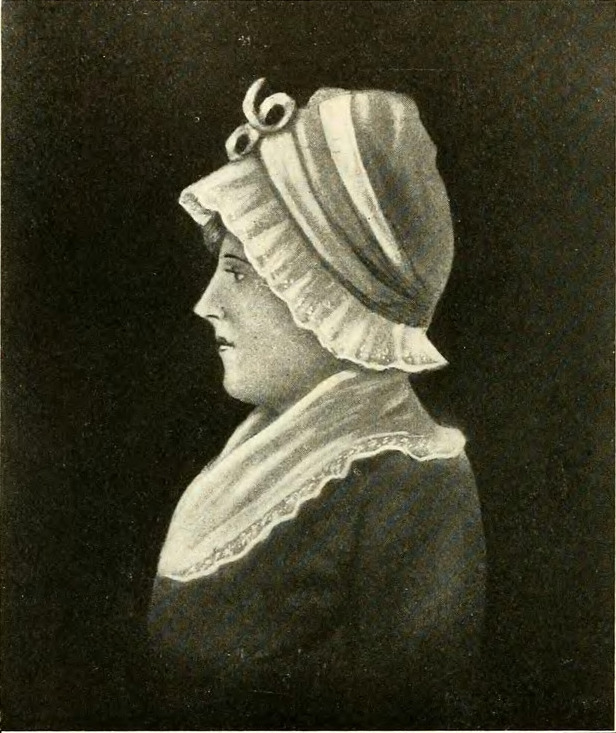
Smith's wife, Anna Bull

- 1801; Smith was elected to the U.S. House of Representatives with 59.27% of the vote, defeating Federalist Philip C. Pendleton.
- 1803; Smith was re-elected with 89.86% of the vote, defeating fellow Democratic-Republican Joseph Sexton.
- 1805; Smith was re-elected unopposed.
- 1807; Smith was re-elected unopposed.
- 1809; Smith was re-elected with 86.59% of the vote, defeating Federalist Robert Page.
- 1811; Smith was re-elected unopposed.
- 1813; Smith was re-elected with 82.39% of the vote, defeating Federalist Page.

== Bibliography ==
- Pecquet du Bellet, Louise (1907). Some Prominent Virginia Families. Vol. 4. Lynchburg, VA: J. P. Bell Company (Incorporated).

U.S. House of Representatives
Preceded by Robert Page	Member of the U.S. House of Representatives from Virginia's 1st congressional district 1801–1803	Succeeded by John G. Jackson
Preceded by George Jackson	Member of the U.S. House of Representatives from Virginia's 3rd congressional district 1803–1815	Succeeded by Henry S. Tucker
