= William Wood (Virginia politician) =

American politician

Member of the Virginia House of Delegates from the Frederick County district
- In office 1840–1844 Serving with James Cather, Richard E. Byrd
- Preceded by: Robert L. Baker and Richard E. Byrd
- Succeeded by: James H. Carson and Jonathan Lovett
- In office January 1, 1838 – April 9, 1838 Serving with Joseph H. Sherrard
- Preceded by: John B. D. Smith and Edgar W. Robinson
- Succeeded by: Joseph H. Sherrard and Richard W. Barton
- In office 1830–1832 Serving with James M. Mason, William Castleman Jr., James G. Bryce, John B. D. Smith
- Preceded by: James M. Mason and William Castleman Jr.
- Succeeded by: John B. D. Smith, Richard W. Barton, John B. Earle

Personal details
- Spouse: Margaret Ridgeway
- Children: 10, including Algernon
- Occupation: Politician

William Wood was an American politician from Virginia. He served as a member of the Virginia House of Delegates from 1830 to 1832, 1838, and 1840 to 1844.

== Early life ==
William Wood was born to Alice (née Coward) and John Wood.

== Career ==
Wood served in the Virginia House of Delegates, representing Frederick County from 1830 to 1832, 1838, and 1840 to 1844. He served as justice. He was appointed as sheriff on March 1, 1852, by Governor Joseph Johnson.

== Personal life ==
Wood married Margaret Ridgeway. They had six sons and four daughters, Algernon Ridgeway, David Henry, Thomas, John Dean, William, Joseph, Martha A., Selena, Mary Jane, and Margaret R. His son Algernon was a member of the Virginia House of Delegates. He owned the farm of Jonah Tavenner. He lived near Pughtown, Virginia.
