= Algernon R. Wood =

American politician (died 1869)

Member of the Virginia House of Delegates from the Frederick County district
- In office 1847–1850 Serving with John F. Wall and Richard M. Sydnor
- Preceded by: John F. Wall and James H. Carson
- Succeeded by: John F. Wall and Richard M. Sydnor

Personal details
- Born: Algernon Ridgeway Wood
- Died: May 9, 1869 Baltimore, Maryland, U.S.
- Resting place: near Pughtown, Virginia, U.S.
- Party: Democratic
- Spouse: Louise Cogswell (m. 1849)
- Children: Anna Cogswell Wood
- Parent: William Wood (father)
- Occupation: Politician; lawyer; judge

Algernon Ridgeway Wood (died May 9, 1869) was an American politician and lawyer from Virginia. He served as a member of the Virginia House of Delegates from 1847 to 1850.

== Early life ==
Algernon Ridgeway Wood was born to Margaret (née Ridgeway) and William Wood. His father was a member of the Virginia legislature. He studied law.

== Career ==
Wood began his career in law in Winchester, Virginia. He served in the Virginia House of Delegates, representing Frederick County from 1847 to 1850. He was a delegate to the Virginia Constitutional Convention of 1850.

Wood moved to Baltimore and continued as a lawyer there. He was appointed as judge to a city court in Baltimore. In 1855, he ran as a Democrat for a Baltimore city seat in the Maryland House of Delegates, but all Democrats were swept by Know Nothing candidates that year.

== Personal life ==
Wood married Louise Cogswell, daughter of Rev. Dr. Jonathan Cogswell, of New Jersey on September 6, 1849. They had a daughter, Anna Cogswell Wood.

Wood died on May 9, 1869, in Baltimore. He was buried in the family burying ground near Pughtown, Virginia.
