= John B. D. Smith =

American politician (died 1839)

Member of the Virginia House of Delegates from the Frederick County district
- In office 1831–1837 Serving with William Wood, James G. Bryce, John B. Earle, James Gibson, Richard W. Barton, James Bowen, John S. Davison, Edgar W. Robinson
- Preceded by: James M. Mason, William Castleman Jr., William Wood
- Succeeded by: William Wood and Joseph H. Sherrard

Personal details
- Born: John Bull Davison Smith; 1803
- Died: May 21, 1839 (aged 35–36) Hannibal, Missouri, U.S.
- Party: Whig
- Spouse: Elizabeth Peyton (m. 1837)
- Relations: Augustine C. Smith (brother)
- Parent: John Smith (father)
- Occupation: Politician; lawyer

John Bull Davison Smith (1803 – May 21, 1839) was an American politician and lawyer from Virginia. He served in the Virginia House of Delegates from 1831 to 1837.

== Early life ==
John Bull Davison Smith was born in 1803 to Animus (née Bull) and John Smith. His brother was Augustine C. Smith.

== Career ==
In 1831, Smith ran as a Whig following the death of delegate-elect Alfred H. Powell for the Virginia House of Delegates. He won the election and represented Frederick County in that body from 1831 to 1837. In 1832, he was a member of the conservative proslavery voting bloc in the House. In 1832, he was appointed as commissioner alongside James Faulkner and John S. Gallaher to settle the boundary line of Virginia. He worked as a lawyer.

== Personal life ==
Smith married Elizabeth Peyton, relative of Daniel Morgan, of Winchester on May 3, 1837.

Smith later moved to Hannibal, Missouri. He died on May 21, 1839, aged about 45 years, in Hannibal.
