= Bee Line March =

1775 American military expedition

The Bee Line March was a military expedition during the American Revolutionary War in 1775. Two companies of volunteer riflemen were formed from Virginia militia units to augment George Washington's forces in Massachusetts. General Daniel Morgan's 96-man unit marched 484 miles (779 km) from Winchester, Virginia to Cambridge, Massachusetts in 21 days, mustering in Winchester on June 22. The Morgan's Riflemen set out on July 16 and arrived on August 6. Another company was supposed to march with Morgan's unit, under the command of Colonel Hugh Stephenson, but ultimately marched on its own. Stephenson's Berkeley Riflemen mustered in Mecklenburg, Virginia (now Shepherdstown, West Virginia) on June 21, started out on July 17, taking 25 days to arrive on August 11. The journeys became known as the Bee Line March.

== Musters and marches ==
In response to the Battles of Lexington and Concord on April 19, 1775, ten rifle companies were authorized by the Second Continental Congress from Pennsylvania, Maryland and Virginia, to form part of the Continental Army. Two were to be provided by Virginia, the 96-man Morgan's Riflemen from Winchester, and the 98-man Berkeley County Riflemen, from Berkeley County, Virginia. There was considerable rivalry between the two companies, each seeking to muster first. However, a shortage of rifles delayed their final musters for six weeks. Though they had planned to march together, the two units started out a day apart, with Morgan's unit gaining a lead..The Berkeley Riflemen started the march from Morgan's Grove, named for an unrelated Daniel Morgan, just to the west of Mecklenburg. Stephenson's unit crossed the Potomac River at Mecklenburg, and Morgan's unit crossed at Harpers Ferry. Although the two units had agreed to meet in Frederick, Maryland and march together thereafter, the rendezvous did not take place, and the two units engaged in an informal race to Massachusetts. Their route ran through Maryland, Pennsylvania, New Jersey, New York, Connecticut and Massachusetts, averaging about 23 miles (37 km) a day. Upon arrival in Cambridge, Stephenson's unit was inspected by George Washington and assigned to help break the siege of Boston.

Through 1776 Stephenson's unit fought near New York, but many were captured at the battle of Fort Washington and died in British prison ships. Stephenson himself returned to Mecklenburg to find more recruits, but died suddenly in the summer of 1776.

The journey of the Berkeley Riflemen was recorded in the diary of one of its participants. 22-year-old Henry Bedinger's diary has been preserved, and offers anecdotes about daily events.

The starting point in Morgan's Grove was designated the birthplace of the United States Army in 1989.

== Berkeley Riflemen's route ==
- July 17: Starting point at Morgan's Grove, near present-day Shepherdstown, West Virginia. Camped that evening at Mirey Springs, 3 miles (4.8 km) from Sharpsburg, Maryland
- July 18 or 19: Marched through Frederick, Maryland
- July 20: Crossed the Monocacy River and camped at Mr. Yenlie's
- July 21: Camped in Peter Little's tavern at Littlestown, Pennsylvania
- July 22: Camped at Peter Wolf's tavern, 5 miles (8.0 km) from York, Pennsylvania
- July 23: Marched through York
- July 24: Crossed the Susquehanna River and camped nearby, losing one man to an accidental shooting at a tavern.
- July 25: Marched through Lancaster, Pennsylvania, losing one man to illness.
- July 26: Camped 4 miles (6.4 km) from Reading, Pennsylvania.
- July 27: Crossed the Schuylkill River near Reading can stayed in Allentown, Pennsylvania
- July 28: Crossed the Lehigh River and Stayed in Bethlehem, Pennsylvania
- July 29: Marched to Easton, Pennsylvania
- July 30: Crossed the Delaware River, marched 18 miles (29 km) into New Jersey and camped
- August 1: Marched to Sussex Courthouse, where they were "used very ill" by local people
- August 2:Crossed into New York
- August 3: Marched to New Windsor, New York, where they tarred and feathered an imposter claiming to be a colonel of a Pennsylvania rifle battalion
- August 4: Crossed the Hudson River at Fishkill, New York, camped in Fishkill at the Black Horse tavern
- August 5: Crossed into Connecticut
- August 6: Marched to Litchfield, Connecticut
- August 7: Camped at Farmington, Connecticut
- August 8: Camped at Hartford, Connecticut, crossed the Connecticut River
- August 9: Marched to a tavern 83 miles (134 km) from Hartford
- August 10: Arrived in Watertown, Massachusetts
- August 11: A 3.5 miles (5.6 km) march to Cambridge, where they were reviewed by Washington
