= Irene Leache =

American teacher

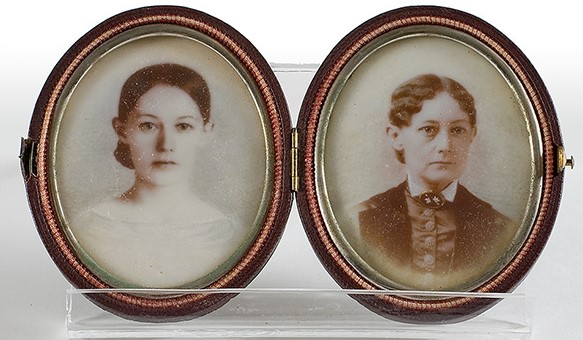
Two photos of a young Irene Leache kept in a locket by Annie Wood

Irene Kirke Leache (1839 — December 2, 1900) was an American teacher and the co-founder of the Leache-Wood Seminary, one of the premier women's schools in the post-Civil War era in Norfolk, Virginia. Posthumously, the Irene Leache Library Association was established in her name to honor her. In 1914, a further memorial, the Irene Leach Art Association was formed to house artworks donated to create a museum in her name, which was the first museum in Norfolk.

== Early life ==
Irene Kirke Leache was born in 1839 on a farm, Wood Park, in Fauquier County, Virginia to Jane Roberts (née Hunton) and Dr. Jesse Willett Leache. Utilizing her father's extensive library, Leache was self-taught in algebra, calculus, geometry and trigonometry, as well as the German language. She left the family home for Westmoreland County when she was hired by the Carter family to teach their children. At the onset of the Civil War, she returned to her home to find their crops ruined. With the war being fought on their land, the family left the area.

When her mother died in the latter part of 1865, Leache accepted the responsibility for raising her younger siblings, simultaneously working at several positions as a governess or teacher at female seminaries. In 1868, she became a teacher in Winchester, Virginia at the female seminary, Angerona. There she met Anna Cogswell Wood and became her tutor. Leache was 29 and Wood was 18.

== Leache-Wood Seminary ==
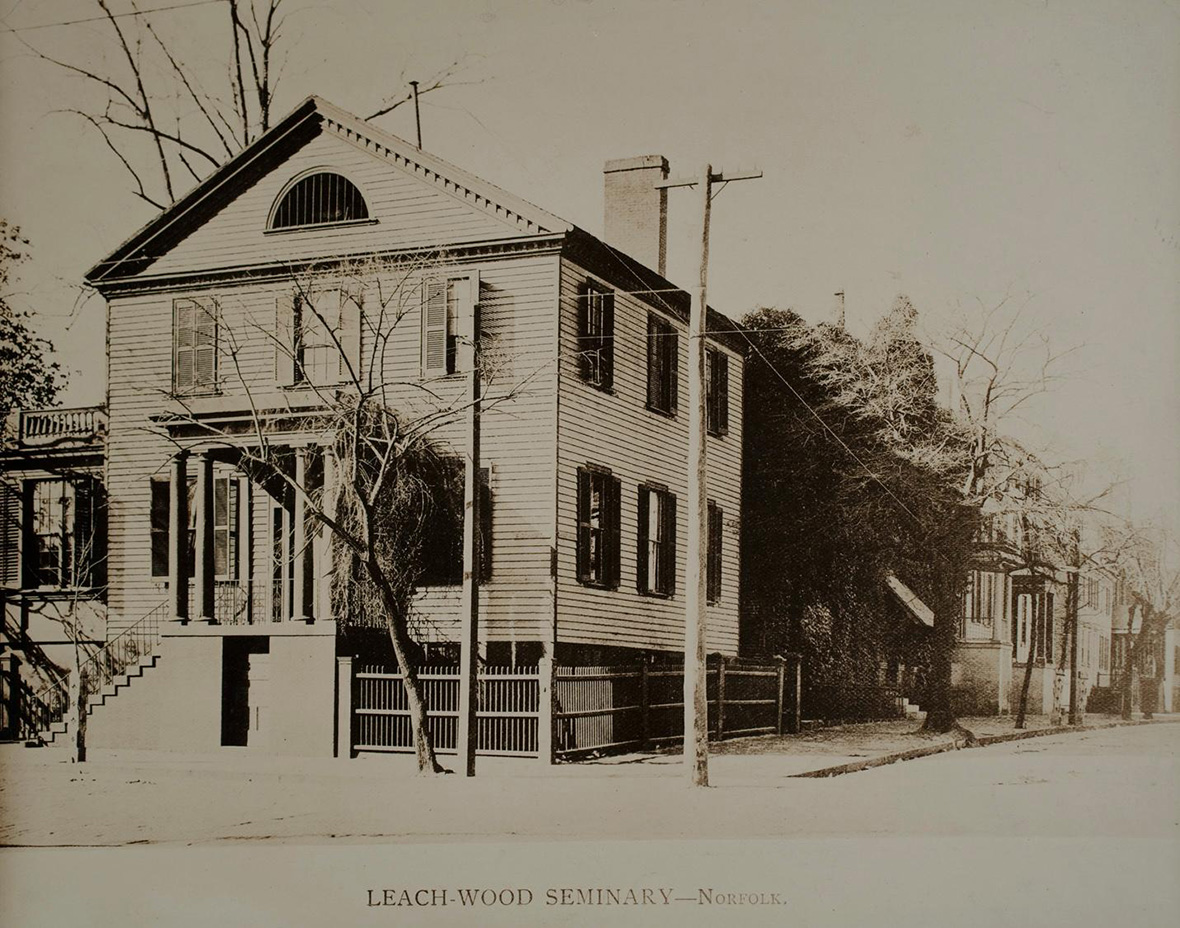
Leache-Wood Seminary

At the urging of the Presbyterian pastor, George Dod Armstrong, they opened their own school, Leache-Wood Seminary, in 1871 in Norfolk, Virginia. In the midst of Reconstruction, the city was rebuilding and the seminary was the only proper female school in the area and Armstrong urged his parishioners to send their daughters to the school.

The school became immediately successful, and by the end of their first year it was free of all debt. By 1880, they taught girls from the age of three, with education from kindergarten through higher learning. Their well-rounded curriculum included the arts, in which they put on theatre productions, and music. They were known for providing a high-quality education. In 1882, Leache-Wood founded the "Fireside Club" as an extension of their cultural evenings. They successfully operated the school for twenty years.

== Personal life ==
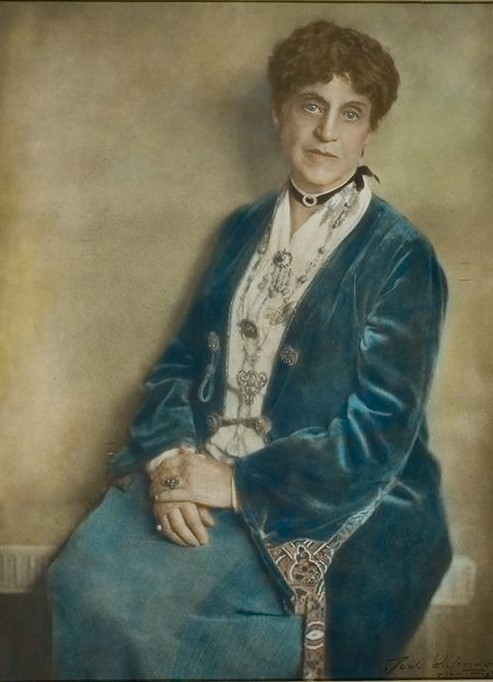
Annie Cogswell Wood, Chrysler Museum of Art's Library Archives

Their relationship was loving one. Wood described Leache as having eyes that were "lucid with thought, lucent with love." They created and hosted the Fireside Club at their apartment on Saturday nights for women and men of Norfolk. Leache and Wood traveled internationally during the summer months.

The women traveled to Europe in early 1891, after selling the school. They traveled extensively visiting Egypt, France, Germany, Italy, Russia, Spain and Sweden. They returned to the United States for several months in the fall of 1898, but by June of the following year, returned to Europe.

== Illness and death ==
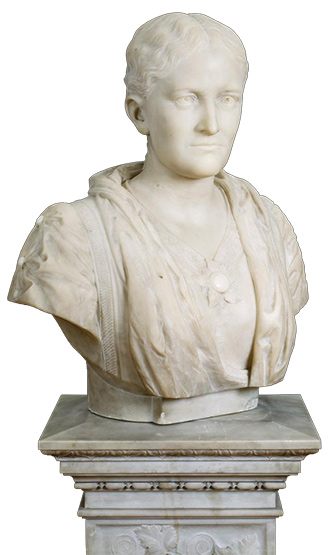
Luigi Guglielmi, Irene Leache, marble, ca. 1903

By the following year, Leache became ill. She and Wood returned to the United States, where Leache died in Norfolk on December 2 from a respiratory illness. Wood went back to Italy and started sending back art works to build the Irene Leache Memorial Art Collection. She also commissioned a white marble bust of Irene to Italian artist Luigi Giglielmini. Wood and Leache are both buried at Elmwood Cemetery, Norfolk City, Virginia. After Leache's death, Wood wrote The Story of a Friendship about their relationship.

== The Irene Leache Memorial Foundation ==
Posthumously, the Irene Leache Library Association was established by former students in her name to honor her in the year of her death. In 1914, a further memorial, the Irene Leach Art Association was formed to house artworks donated to create a museum in her name, which was the first museum in Norfolk.(Earle 2008, p. 6) It was founded by Wood, to honor her friend, and later incorporated into three rooms in the Chrysler Museum of Art in Norfolk. The Irene Leach Memorial also promoted a Biennial Art Show for more than 80 years, from 1918 to 1999, and an annual Literary Contest and now grants literary, performing (theater, dance, music), and visual arts awards.
