= Augustine C. Smith =

American politician (1789–1843)

Member of the Virginia Senate from the Frederick and Jefferson counties district
- In office 1827–1830
- Preceded by: William B. Page
- Succeeded by: Hierome L. Opie

Personal details
- Born: Augustine Charles Smith; April 5, 1789 Frederick County, Virginia, U.S.
- Died: July 26, 1843 (aged 54) Winchester, Virginia, U.S.
- Spouse: Elizabeth Daingerfield Magill
- Relations: John B. D. Smith (brother)
- Children: 15
- Parent: John Smith (father)
- Education: College of William & Mary
- Occupation: Politician; lawyer; educator

Augustine Charles Smith (April 5, 1789 – July 26, 1843) was an American politician, lawyer, and educator from Virginia. He served in the Virginia Senate from 1827 to 1830.

== Early life ==
Augustine Charles Smith was born on April 5, 1789, at Hackwood Park, Frederick County, Virginia, to Animus (née Bull) and John Smith. His brother was John B. D. Smith. He graduated from the College of William & Mary in 1811.

== Career ==
At the outbreak of the War of 1812, Smith volunteered for the United States Army and was commissioned as major on March 3, 1813. he was assigned to the 31st Infantry Regiment and rose to the rank of colonel. He received a leave of absence from his regiment to participate in the defense of Washington, D.C. He was assigned to General William H. Winder's staff and had his horse shot out from under him at the Battle of Bladensburg. At the end of the war, he continued service in the regular army and was commissioned as lieutenant colonel of the 12th Infantry Regiment on September 21, 1814. He disbanded from service in June 1815.

Smith served in the Virginia Senate, representing Frederick and Jefferson counties, from 1827 to 1830. He worked as a lawyer and served as counsel for slaves. He was secretary of the Auxiliary Society of Frederick County for Colonizing the Free People of Colour.

Smith was a teacher and preceptor at the Winchester Academy in the 1810s. In 1836, he began working at the Female Seminary in Columbia, South Carolina. He resigned the position and returned to Winchester in 1840. He then served as the prosecuting attorney for Winchester.

== Personal life ==
Smith married Elizabeth Daingerfield Magill, eldest daughter of Charles Magill. They had 15 children, including John Augustine, Charles Magill, Augustine Jaquelin, A. Magill, Mrs. C. B. Hite, Mrs. L. E. Swartzwelder, Mrs. John Marshall, Mrs. William A. Morgan, and Mrs. G. W. Jackson. His grandson was educator William Morgan Smith. He was a ruling elder of the Presbyterian Church in Winchester from April 25, 1817, to March 30, 1832. He was then affiliated with the Episcopal Church, but continued his support for the Presbyterian Church.

Smith died on July 26, 1843, in Winchester.
