= Anna Cogswell Wood =

American novelist

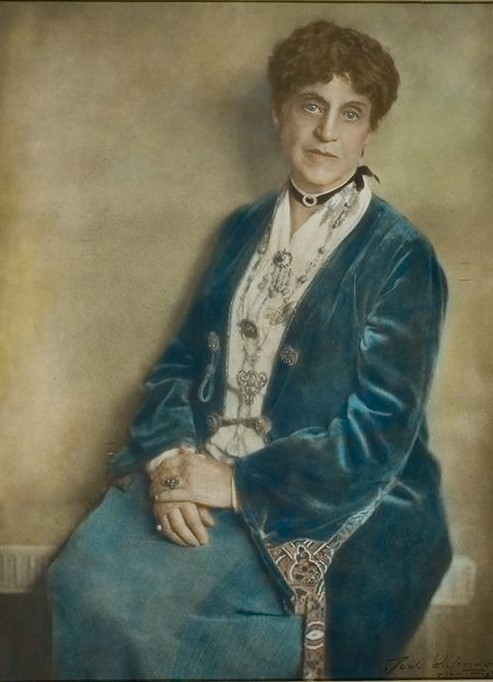
Annie Cogswell Wood, Chrysler Museum of Art's Library Archives

Anna "Annie" Cogswell Wood (born in Winchester, VA, August 2, 1850, died in Florence, Italy, February 9, 1940) was an American writer, art collector, teacher, and the co-founder of Leache-Wood Seminary in Norfolk, Virginia. When writing, she wrote under both her own name and the pseudonym Algernon Ridgeway. Upon the death of her friend, Irene Leache, she founded the Irene Leache Memorial Collection, now a part of the Chrysler Museum of Art in Norfolk.

== Life ==
Wood's father was Algernon Ridgeway Wood, a Virginia General Assemblyman who married Louisa Cogswell. In 1850 he moved his wife and newborn daughter, Annie Cogswell Wood, to New York. The Cogswells were an illustrious family, with a lineage stretching to the Colonial era. In 1865, Wood's aunt, Elizabeth Lord Cogswell Dixon, married James Dixon, a United States Representative and Senator from Connecticut and close ally to President Abraham Lincoln. Elizabeth Dixon and her sister, Mary Cogswell Kinney, befriended Mary Todd Lincoln, President Lincoln's wife, during the tumult of the Civil War. When president Lincoln was shot, a distraught Lincoln sent a messenger to summon her close friends Elizabeth Dixon and Mary Kinney from their homes in Lafayette Square.

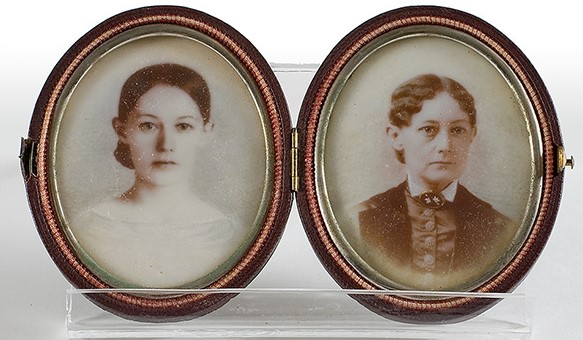
two photos of a young Irene Leache kept in a locket owned by Annie Wood

Leache and Wood met at Valley Female Seminary in Winchester, Virginia in 1868 while both resided at the Seminary's main campus building, known as "Angerona". Anna Wood was a student and Irene Leache was a newly hired faculty member.

Wood's great-grandfather's name was Dr. Nathaniel Cogswell, a shipping merchant and gunrunner in the mid 18th century. His fortune was inherited by his brother, the Rev. Dr. Jonathan Cogswell. The reverend had no sons, and Annie's mother, Louise, and her two sisters, inherited the money. When Louise divorced Annie's father, she retained her fortune, which then passed to her daughter, Annie, in 1891, the same year Annie and Irene left for Europe, after running the Leache-Wood Seminary for nearly two decades.

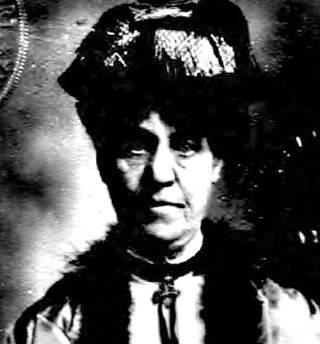
a 20th-century passport photo of Wood

In early 1900, Leache's health began to fail while in Europe. Leache and Wood returned to the States, and Leache died on December 2, 1900. Shortly after, Wood established the Irene Leache Library and she returned to Europe. She then began to send works of art back to Norfolk.

Upon her death in 1940, Wood left her estate to the Irene Leache Memorial. Wood and Leache are both buried at Elmwood Cemetery, Norfolk City, Virginia.

== Works ==
- Diana Fontaine. A novel, Philadelphia, J.B. Lippincott Company, 1891
- Westover's ward, London, R. Bentley, 1892
- The story of a friendship. A memoir, New York, Knickerbocker Press, 1901
- Idyls and impressions of travel from the note-books of two friends, New York & Washington, Neale Pub. Co., 1904
- Drama sketches for parlor acting or recitation, Florence, Editori Librai, 1925
- The great opportunity and other essays, Florence, Italy, 1926
- The psychology of crime illustrated by several modern poets, Florence, TIP. Giuntina
