= Daniel Morgan House =

Historic house in Virginia, United States

- U.S. National Register of Historic Places
- U.S. Historic district – Contributing property
- Virginia Landmarks Register
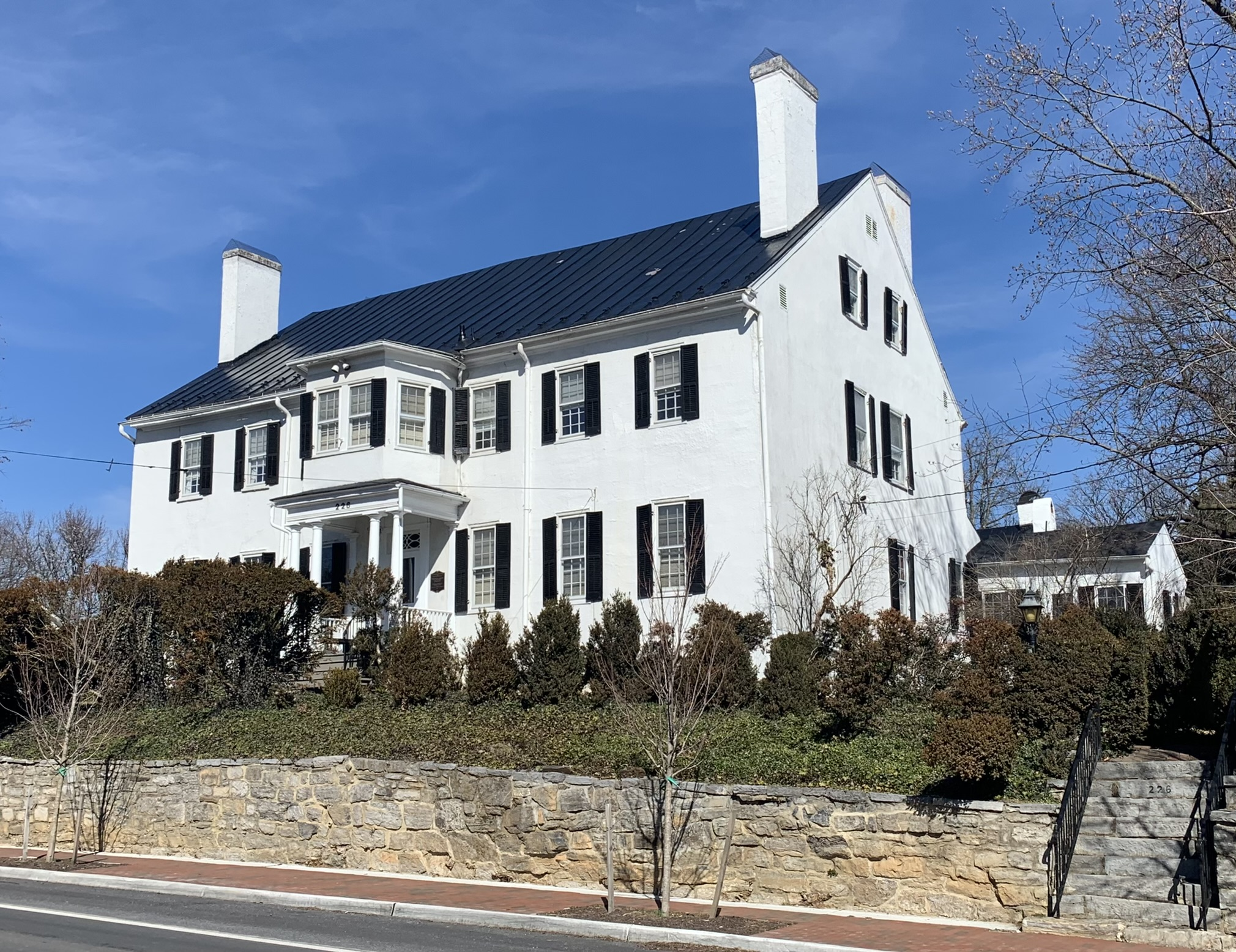
- Daniel Morgan House, February 2022

- Location within Virginia Location within the United States
- Location: 226 Amherst St., Winchester, Virginia
- Coordinates: 39°11′11″N 78°10′09″W
- Area: .75 acres (0.30 ha)
- Built: 1786, c. 1800, c. 1820, c. 1885, c. 1890, c. 1915
- Architectural style: Late Georgian
- NRHP reference No.: 12001274
- VLR No.: 138-0018

Significant dates
- Added to NRHP: February 5, 2013
- Designated VLR: December 13, 2012

Daniel Morgan House, also known as the George Flowerdew Norton House, Boyd House, and Sherrard House, is a historic home located at Winchester, Virginia, United States. It is a 2 1/2-story, seven-bay, 17 room, Late Georgian style brick dwelling. It has a side-gable roof and paired double interior chimneys. The oldest section was built about 1786 for George Flowerdew Norton, and the western stuccoed brick wing was built for Daniel Morgan (1736–1802) about 1800. A brick kitchen, built about 1820 is attached to the north side of the dwelling and two-story addition, constructed about 1885, is attached to the northwest corner of the house. A one-room addition was added to the eastern side about 1890, and a second-story room was built above the back porch about 1915. Also on the property is a contributing coursed stone retaining wall (c. 1900).

It was added to the National Register of Historic Places in 2013. It is located in the Winchester Historic District.

Gen.Daniel Morgan died in this house on July 6, 1802. The house then was the home of his daughter.
