= Robert Page (Virginia politician) =

American politician (1765–1840)

Member of the U.S. House of Representatives from Virginia's 1st district
- In office March 4, 1799 – March 3, 1801
- Preceded by: Daniel Morgan
- Succeeded by: John Smith

Member of the Virginia House of Delegates from Frederick County
- In office 1795; Alongside Archibald Magill Serving with Archibald Magill

Personal details
- Born: February 4, 1765 Gloucester County, Virginia Colony, British America
- Died: December 8, 1840 (aged 75) Clarke County, Virginia, U.S.
- Resting place: Millwood, Virginia
- Party: Federalist
- Profession: planter, lawyer

Robert Page (February 4, 1765 – December 8, 1840) was a United States representative from Virginia.

Born at North End, Gloucester County (now Mathews County) in the Colony of Virginia, he received a liberal education from tutors at home. He attended the College of William and Mary, which he left to join the War of Independence, serving as a captain in the Virginia militia. He studied law, was admitted to the bar and practiced in Frederick County (now Clarke County) and adjacent counties. He was a planter and a member of the council of state, and was a member of the Virginia House of Delegates in 1795.

Page was elected as a Federalist, defeating Democratic-Republican John Smith, to the Sixth Congress, serving from March 4, 1799, to March 3, 1801. He resumed former activities and died at Janeville, in Clarke County. Interment was in Old Chapel Cemetery near Millwood.

U.S. House of Representatives
Preceded by Daniel Morgan	Member of the U.S. House of Representatives from Virginia's 1st congressional district 1799–1801	Succeeded by John Smith
