= Morgan's Riflemen =

Elite light infantry unit in the American Revolutionary War

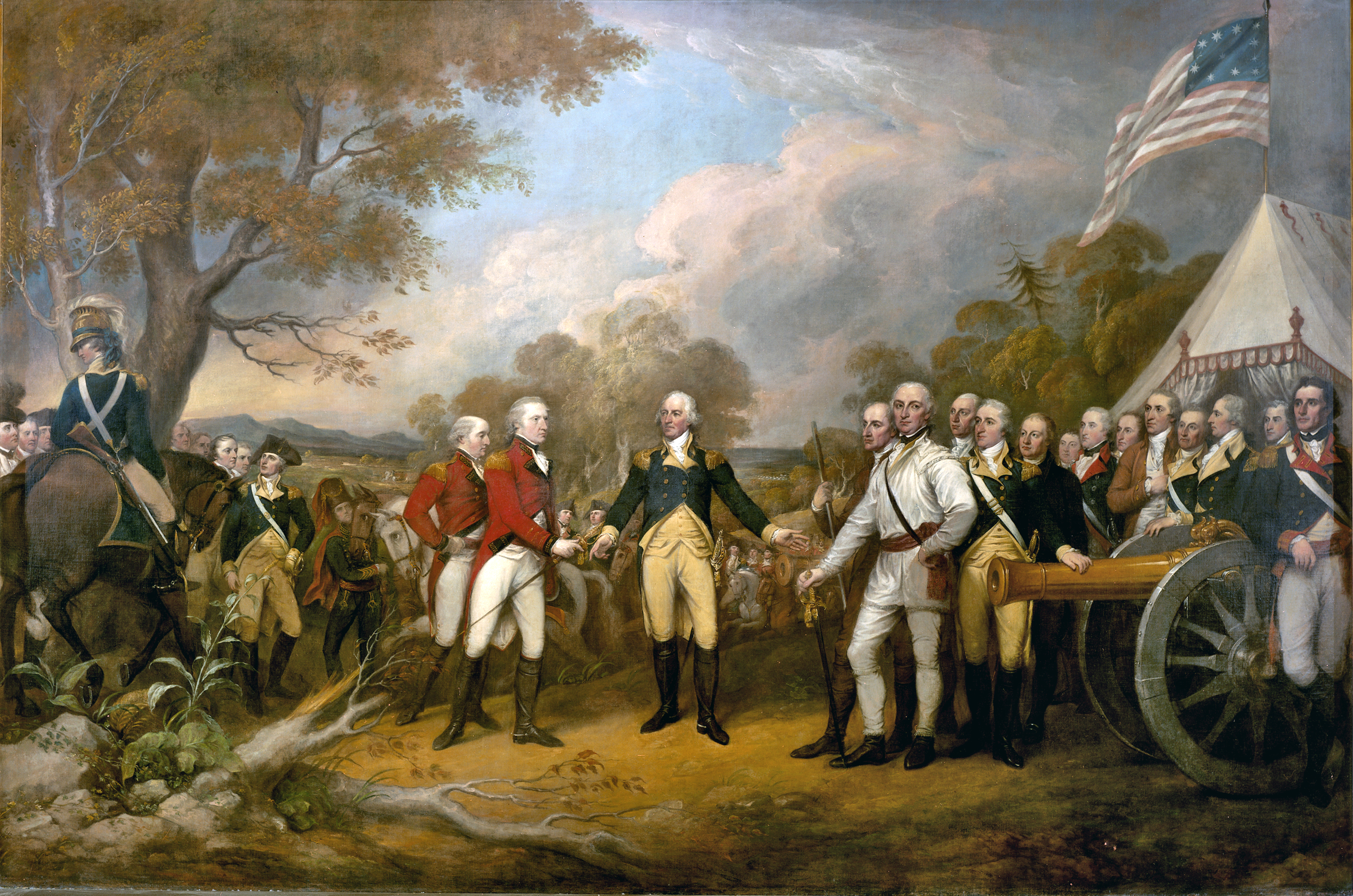
Surrender of General Burgoyne Col. Morgan, having led his Riflemen in this victory, is shown in white, right of center

Morgan's Riflemen or Morgan's Rifles, previously Morgan's Sharpshooters, and the one named Provisional Rifle Corps, were an elite light infantry unit commanded by General Daniel Morgan in the American Revolutionary War, which served a vital role executing his tasks because its men were equipped with rifles, with an effective range of 300-500 yards, rather than of smoothbore muskets, which had an effective range of 100 yards, giving riflemen a strategic advantage if properly deployed and utilized in battle.

== History ==
Daniel Morgan began his Revolutionary War service in 1775, when he commanded a company of western Virginians in the Beeline March to Boston. Morgan recruited 96 men (80 men and 16 officers), marched 600 miles, arriving in Boston on August 6, 1775. They gave an exhibition as described in the Virginia Gazette of September 9, 1775: "A man held between his knees a board 5 inches wide and seven inches long, with a paper bulls-eye the size of a dollar. A rifleman at 60 yards without a rest, put eight bullets in succession through the bulls-eye." From the same source we are told that the rifleman gave an exhibition "in which a company, on a quick advance, placed their shots in 7 inch targets at 250 yards".

The rifle, or more specifically the Pennsylvania Long Rifle, was an important symbol and tool on Virginia's frontier. A technology which originated in Europe, rifling was introduced to the colonial backcountry by German immigrant gunsmiths, who adapted the technology of the shorter, Germanic jaeger rifle to the longer style of flintlocks which were popular in America.

Later Morgan's most significant action was support for the invasion of Canada and the Battle of Quebec in which he was seen as a hero, despite General Benedict Arnold's overall failure and their subsequent capture.

In early 1777, when Morgan was freed from captivity, he was commissioned as a colonel and assigned command of the 11th Virginia Regiment, and a few months later was also instructed by George Washington to form a Provisional Rifle Corps, men skilled with the use of the long rifle, from his and other nearby regiments.

Having done so, his first assignment was to harass Colonel William Howe as he retreated through New Jersey. Morgan did so by having his 500 riflemen snipe the enemy troops as they moved, using their longer range to do so from safety, an unusual tactic for that day.

Sent to join the northern army headed by General Horatio Gates, Morgan's Riflemen helped establish better conditions for the coming Battle of Saratoga, by a series of quick attacks on their Indian allies, driving them back in order to interfere with British intelligence of the American troops' movements. His riflemen proved pivotal in several engagements, including driving back an advanced unit all the way to the enemy's main forces, and later helping turn the main battle by attacking from the right flank, and is credited with forcing the British retreat.

In the summer and fall of 1779, Morgan and his riflemen were part of Sullivan's Expedition into the Southern Tier and Finger Lakes regions of New York.

After a series of similar successes, Morgan left active service for a year, then joined the southern army with Nathanael Greene.

In the January 1781 Battle of Cowpens, Morgan led Continental troops to a major victory that resulted in the near-total destruction of Tarleton's force.

Morgan retired shortly afterwards due to health issues.

== Popular media ==
Morgan's Riflemen were a key model for the fictional unit portrayed in the movie The Patriot, by Mel Gibson.

In Empire: Total War, Morgan's Riflemen was a unique unit to the United States via DLC.

In the seventh season of the television series Outlander, Jamie Fraser is recruited by Daniel Morgan to join the Riflemen.

== Bibliography ==
- Golway, Terry (2005). Washington's General: Nathanael Greene and the Triumph of the American Revolution. Henry Holt and Company, LLC. ISBN 0-8050-7066-4.
