= Locust Hill, Middlesex County, Virginia =

Unincorporated community in Virginia, United States

Locust Hill, Virginia
- Unincorporated community
- Location within Virginia Location within the United States
- Coordinates: 37°35′58″N 76°30′40″W
- Country: United States
- State: Virginia
- County: Middlesex
- Elevation: 92 ft (28 m)
- Time zone: UTC-5 (Eastern (EST))
  - Summer (DST): UTC-4 (EDT)
- ZIP code: 23092
- Area code: 804
- GNIS feature ID: 1499679

Locust Hill is an unincorporated community in Middlesex County, Virginia, United States. Locust Hill is located on Virginia State Route 33, 4.6 miles (7.4 km) east of Saluda. Locust Hill has a post office with ZIP code 23092, which opened on March 20, 1852.
