= Gainesboro, Virginia =

Unincorporated community in Virginia, United States

- Unincorporated community
- Location within Virginia Location within the United States
- Coordinates: 39°16′42″N 78°15′33″W
- Country: United States
- State: Virginia
- County: Frederick
- Time zone: UTC−5 (Eastern (EST))
  - Summer (DST): UTC−4 (EDT)
- GNIS feature ID: 1466944

Gainesboro (/ˈɡeɪnzbʌrə/) is an unincorporated community in Frederick County, Virginia, United States. Gainesboro is located northwest of Winchester off the North Frederick Pike (US 522) on Gainesboro Road (VA 684). Gainesboro is the northernmost community in Virginia.

Gainesboro was established in 1798 and originally known as Pugh Town or Pughtown after an early settler, Job Pugh, who surveyed and plotted the original village.

== Historic sites ==
- Gainesboro School (1935), 5629 North Frederick Pike
- Gainesboro United Methodist Church

== Government ==
At the national level, Gainesboro is located in Virginia's 10th congressional district, represented by Democrat Jennifer Wexton as of January 3, 2019.
