= Zachary Taylor =

President of the United States from 1849 to 1850

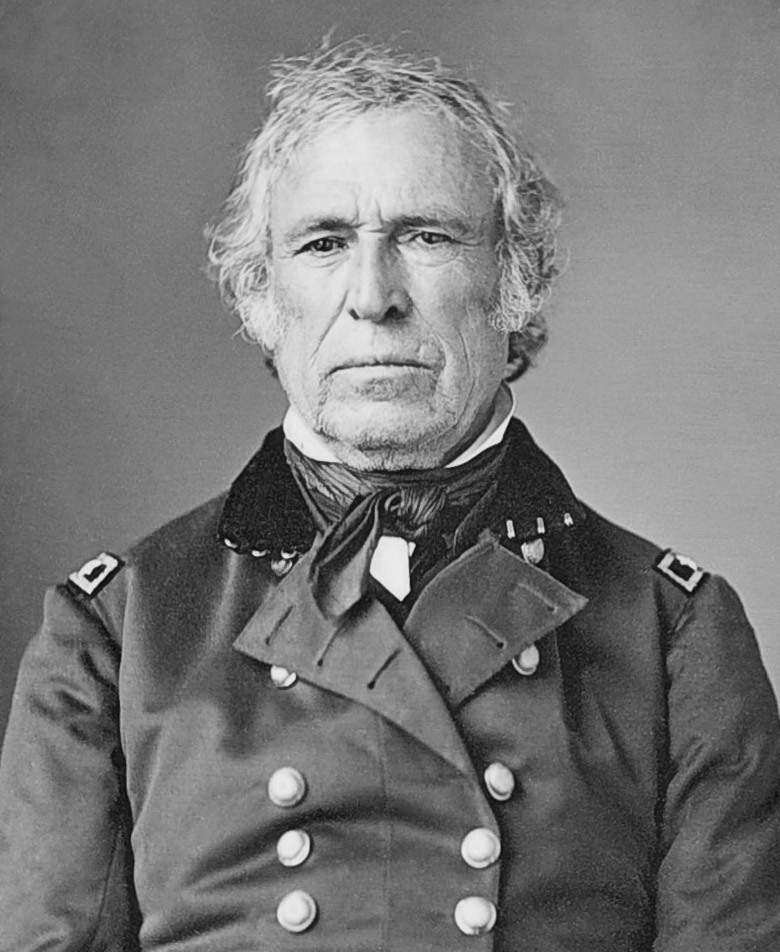
- Taylor c. 1843–45

12th President of the United States
- In office March 4, 1849 (Note: Taylor's term of service was scheduled to begin at noon EST on March 4, 1849, but as this day fell on a Sunday, Taylor refused to be sworn in until the following day. Vice President Millard Fillmore was also not sworn in on that day. Most legal scholars agree that, according to the Constitution, Taylor's term began on March 4, regardless of whether he had taken the oath.) – July 9, 1850
- Vice President: Millard Fillmore
- Preceded by: James K. Polk
- Succeeded by: Millard Fillmore

1st Commander of the Army of Occupation
- In office April 23, 1845 – July 23, 1848
- Appointed by: James K. Polk
- Preceded by: Office established
- Succeeded by: William Davenport

Personal details
- Born: November 24, 1784 Barboursville, Virginia, U.S.
- Died: July 9, 1850 (aged 65) White House, Washington, D.C., U.S.
- Cause of death: Stomach disease
- Resting place: Zachary Taylor National Cemetery
- Party: Whig
- Spouse: Margaret Smith (m. 1810)
- Children: 6, including Sarah, Mary, and Richard
- Parents: Richard Taylor; Sarah Dabney Strother
- Profession: Military officer
- Awards: Congressional Gold Medal (3); Thanks of Congress

Military service
- Branch/service: United States Army
- Years of service: 1808–1849
- Rank: Major General
- Commands: Army of Occupation
- Battles/wars: War of 1812; Siege of Fort Harrison; Battle of Credit Island; Black Hawk War; Second Seminole War; Battle of Lake Okeechobee; Mexican–American War; Battle of Palo Alto; Battle of Resaca de la Palma; Battle of Monterrey; Battle of Buena Vista

Zachary Taylor (November 24, 1784 – July 9, 1850) was the 12th president of the United States, serving from 1849 until his death in 1850. Before his presidency, Taylor was a career officer in the United States Army, rising to the rank of major general and becoming a national hero for his victories in the Mexican–American War. As a result, he won election to the White House despite his vague political beliefs. His top priority as president was to preserve the Union. He died 16 months into his term from a stomach disease. Taylor had the third-shortest presidential term in U.S. history.

Taylor was a descendant of the Lee family of Virginia, and was born into a prominent family of plantation owners who moved westward from Virginia to Louisville, Kentucky, in his youth. He was the last president born before the Constitution of the United States was adopted. He was commissioned as an officer in the U.S. Army in 1808 and made a name for himself as a captain in the War of 1812. He climbed the ranks of the military, establishing military forts along the Mississippi River and entering the Black Hawk War as a colonel in 1832. His success in the Second Seminole War attracted national attention and earned him the nickname "Old Rough and Ready".

In 1845, during the annexation of Texas, President James K. Polk dispatched Taylor to the Rio Grande in anticipation of a battle with Mexico over the disputed Texas–Mexico border. The Mexican–American War broke out in April 1846, and Taylor defeated Mexican troops commanded by General Mariano Arista at the battles of Palo Alto and Resaca de la Palma, driving Arista's troops out of Texas. Taylor then led his troops into Mexico, where they defeated Mexican troops commanded by Pedro de Ampudia at the Battle of Monterrey. Defying orders, Taylor led his troops further south and, though severely outnumbered, repelled Mexican forces under General Antonio López de Santa Anna at the Battle of Buena Vista, forcing a withdrawal but without a clear-cut victory. Taylor's troops were transferred to the command of Major General Winfield Scott, but Taylor retained his popularity.

The Whig Party convinced a reluctant Taylor to lead its ticket in the 1848 presidential election, despite his unclear political tenets and lack of interest in politics. At the 1848 Whig National Convention, Taylor defeated Winfield Scott and former senator Henry Clay for the party's nomination. He won the general election alongside New York politician Millard Fillmore, defeating Democratic Party nominees Lewis Cass and William Orlando Butler, as well as a third-party effort led by former president Martin Van Buren and Charles Francis Adams Sr. of the Free Soil Party. Taylor became the first president to be elected without having previously held political office. As president, he kept his distance from Congress and his Cabinet, even though partisan tensions threatened to divide the Union. Debate over the status of slavery in the Mexican Cession dominated the national political agenda and led to threats of secession from Southerners. Despite being a Southerner and a slaveholder himself, Taylor did not push for the expansion of slavery into the new western territories. To avoid the slavery issue, he urged settlers in New Mexico and California to bypass the territorial stage and draft constitutions for statehood. The debate around the potential new states set the stage for the Compromise of 1850.

Taylor died suddenly of a stomach disease on July 9, 1850, with his administration having accomplished little aside from the ratification of the Clayton–Bulwer Treaty. He was unable to make any progress on the most divisive issue in Congress and the nation: slavery. Vice President Fillmore assumed the presidency and served the remainder of his term. Historians and scholars have ranked Taylor in the bottom quartile of U.S. presidents, owing in part to his short term of office (16 months), though he has been described as "more a forgettable president than a failed one".

== Early life ==
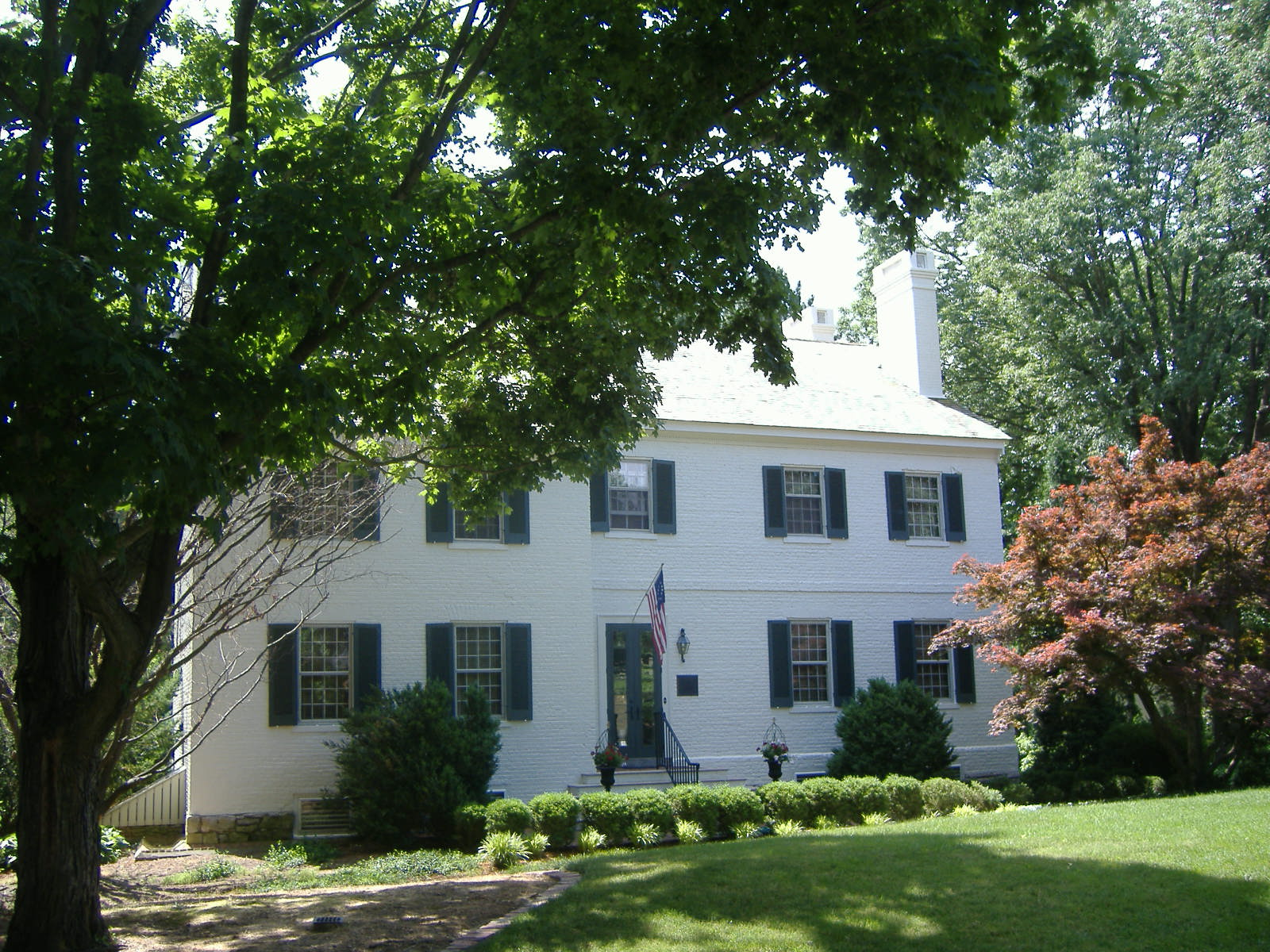
Taylor's childhood home in Louisville, Kentucky

Zachary Taylor was born on November 24, 1784, on a plantation in Orange County, Virginia, to a prominent family of planters of English ancestry. His birthplace may have been Hare Forest Farm, the home of his maternal grandfather William Strother, but this is uncertain. Another possibility, one recognized by a historical marker, is Montebello, another Orange County estate. He was the third of five surviving sons in his family (a sixth died in infancy) and had three younger sisters. His mother was Sarah Dabney (née Strother) Taylor. His father, Richard Taylor, served as a lieutenant colonel in the American Revolution. His great-grandfather James Taylor was a member of the Virginia House of Burgesses.

Taylor was the 4th great-grandson of Elder William Brewster, a Pilgrim leader of the Plymouth Colony, a Mayflower immigrant, and a signer of the Mayflower Compact, and the 2nd great-grandson of Isaac Allerton Jr., a colonial merchant, colonel, and the son of Mayflower Pilgrim Isaac Allerton and Fear Brewster, who was William Brewster's daughter. Taylor's second cousin through that line was James Madison, the fourth president. He was also a member of the famous Lee family of Virginia, and a third cousin once removed of Confederate General Robert E. Lee.

His family forsook its exhausted Virginia land, joined the westward migration, and settled near future Louisville, Kentucky, on the Ohio River. Taylor grew up in a small woodland cabin until, with increased prosperity, his family moved to a brick house. As a child, he lived in a battleground of the Northwest Indian War, later claiming that he had seen Native Americans abduct and scalp his classmates while they were walking down the road together. Louisville's rapid growth was a boon for Taylor's father, who by the start of the 19th century had acquired 10,000 acres (40 km^{2}) throughout Kentucky, as well as 26 slaves to cultivate the most developed portion of his holdings. Taylor's formal education was sporadic because Kentucky's education system was just taking shape during his formative years.

Taylor's mother taught him to read and write, and he later attended a school operated by Elisha Ayer, a teacher originally from Connecticut. He also attended a Middletown, Kentucky, academy run by Kean O'Hara, a classically trained scholar from Ireland and the father of Theodore O'Hara. Ayer recalled Taylor as a patient and quick learner, but his early letters showed a weak grasp of spelling and grammar, as well as poor handwriting. All improved over time, but his handwriting remained difficult to read.

== Family life and properties ==
=== Marriage and children ===
While he was stationed near New Orleans in the summer of 1809, Taylor fell ill with dysentery and returned to Louisville to recover. In Louisville, he returned to health quickly and began attending more public events. At one ball in the autumn, he met Margaret Mackall Smith, the sister of one of his friends. "Peggy" Smith came from a prominent family of Maryland planters—her father was Major Walter Smith, who had served in the Revolutionary War and died in 1804. The two soon began courting, and they were married on June 21, 1810. Taylor's father gave them 324 acres of land at the mouth of Beargrass Creek as a wedding gift. The couple had six children:

- Ann Mackall Taylor (1811–1875), married Robert C. Wood, a U.S. Army surgeon at Fort Snelling, in 1829. Their son John Taylor Wood served in the U.S. Navy and the Confederate Navy. Wood was the father of:
  - Zachary Taylor Wood, acting Commissioner of the North-West Mounted Police and Commissioner of Yukon Territory.
  - Charles Carroll Wood, Lieutenant with the British Army.
- Sarah Knox "Knoxie" Taylor (1814–1835), married Jefferson Davis in 1835, a subordinate officer she had met through her father at the end of the Black Hawk War; she died at 21 of malaria in St. Francisville, Louisiana, three months after her marriage.
- Octavia Pannell Taylor (1816–1820), died in early childhood.
- Margaret Smith Taylor (1819–1820), died in infancy along with Octavia when the Taylor family was stricken with a "bilious fever."
- Mary Elizabeth "Betty" Taylor (1824–1909), married William Wallace Smith Bliss in 1848 (he died in 1853); married Philip Pendleton Dandridge in 1858.
- Richard Taylor (1826–1879), a Confederate Army general; married Louise Marie Myrthe Bringier in 1851.

=== Properties and slaveholdings ===
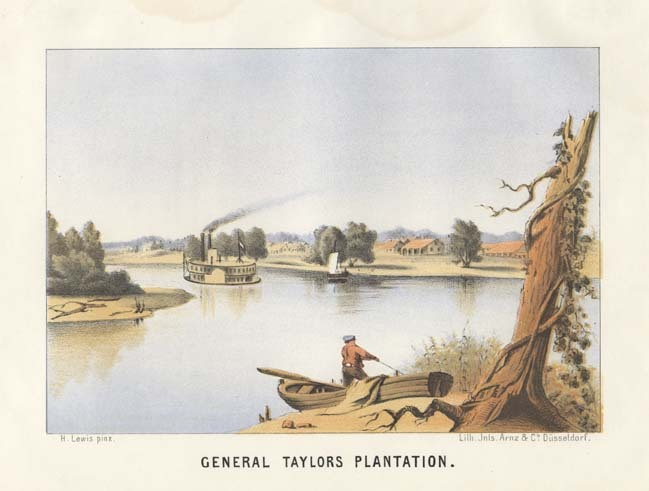
Illustration of Taylor's Cypress Grove Plantation on the Mississippi River

After their marriage, Taylor and his wife bought a dilapidated cottage in Baton Rouge, Louisiana, which they finished remodeling shortly before the War of 1812 broke out. Around the same time, he began to purchase a good deal of bank stock in Louisville. He also began to buy land on the Mississippi River, including properties in West Feliciana Parish, Louisiana, and Wilkinson County, Mississippi, which proved to be profitable investments. From the mid-1820s, he maintained Baton Rouge as his primary residence and family home, though he was frequently away on military duties. From 1841 to 1844 he moved his family to Fort Smith, Arkansas, to be closer to his military posting.

In April 1842, Taylor bought the Cypress Grove Plantation in Jefferson County, Mississippi, acquiring the 1,823-acre (738 ha) property and its 81 slaves for $95,000 (equivalent to $3,200,000 in 2025). By the time of his death in 1850 there were 127 slaves on the property, although the Anti-Slavery Reporter reported at the time that Taylor owned at least 200 slaves. Despite being in one of the state's most productive cotton-growing regions, Cypress Grove failed to turn a profit for Taylor, due to low cotton prices, frequent flooding, poor weather, and difficulties with pests. Taylor and his manager, Thomas Ringgold, attempted to make the property self-sufficient, also selling timber to defray costs and building an extensive system of levees and floodgates. He remained an absentee owner even during peacetime and his wife apparently never visited the property. He appointed his son Richard as co-manager.

== Military career ==
=== Initial commissions ===
After serving briefly in the Kentucky militia in 1806, Taylor joined the U.S. Army on May 3, 1808, receiving a commission from President Thomas Jefferson as a first lieutenant of the Kentuckian Seventh Infantry Regiment. He was among the new officers Congress commissioned in response to the Chesapeake–Leopard affair, in which the crew of a British Royal Navy warship had boarded a United States Navy frigate, sparking calls for war. Taylor spent much of 1809 in the dilapidated camps of New Orleans and nearby Terre aux Boeufs, in the Territory of Orleans. Under James Wilkinson's command, the soldiers at Terre aux Boeufs suffered greatly from disease and lack of supplies, and Taylor was given an extended leave, returning to Louisville to recover.

After recovering, Taylor travelled south to join his regiment, but learned that there was no assignment for him, and thus waited in Louisville. Taylor was promoted to captain in November 1810. In July 1811 he was called to the Indiana Territory, where he joined General William Henry Harrison, governor of the Indiana Territory, and on July 10, he assumed control of Fort Knox after the commandant fled. Taylor quickly wrote to Secretary of War William Eustis, explaining the lack of clothing and supplies at the fort. Within a few weeks, he had restored order in the garrison, for which he was lauded by Governor Harrison. Taylor was temporarily called to Washington, D.C., to testify for Wilkinson as a witness in a court-martial, and so did not take part in the November 1811 Battle of Tippecanoe against the forces of Tecumseh, a Shawnee chief.

=== War of 1812 ===
During the War of 1812, in which U.S. forces battled the British Empire and its Indian allies, Taylor defended Fort Harrison in Indiana Territory from an Indian attack commanded by Tecumseh. The September 1812 battle was the American forces' first land victory of the war, for which Taylor received wide praise, as well as a brevet (temporary) promotion to the rank of major. According to historian John Eisenhower, this was the first brevet awarded in U.S. history. Later that year, Taylor joined General Samuel Hopkins as an aide on two expeditions—one into the Illinois Territory and one to the Tippecanoe battle site, where they were forced to retreat in the Battle of Wild Cat Creek. Taylor moved his family to Fort Knox after the violence subsided.

In the spring of 1814, Taylor was called back into action under Brigadier General Benjamin Howard, and after Howard fell sick, Taylor led a 430-man expedition from St. Louis, up the Mississippi River. In the Battle of Credit Island, Taylor defeated Indian forces, but retreated after the Indians were joined by their British allies. That October he supervised the construction of Fort Johnson near present-day Warsaw, Illinois, the last toehold of the U.S. Army in the upper Mississippi River Valley. Upon Howard's death a few weeks later, Taylor was ordered to abandon the fort and retreat to St. Louis. Reduced to the rank of captain when the war ended in 1815, he resigned from the army. He reentered it a year later after gaining a commission as a major.

=== Command of Fort Howard ===
The command of his regiment was based in Fort Mackinac; however, the leading colonel was put on leave shortly after Taylor's arrival, and was replaced with a captain, which heavily annoyed Taylor. He therefore requested for the command to be moved to Fort Howard and placed under his authority. Taylor commanded Fort Howard at the Green Bay, Michigan Territory, settlement for two years, then returned to Louisville and his family. In April 1819 he was promoted to the rank of lieutenant colonel and dined with President James Monroe and General Andrew Jackson. In late 1820, Taylor took the 7th Infantry to Natchitoches, Louisiana, on the Red River. He subsequently established Fort Selden at the confluence of the Sulphur River and the Red River. On the orders of General Edmund P. Gaines, he later found a new post more convenient to the Sabine River frontier. By March 1822, Taylor had established Fort Jesup at the Shield's Spring site southwest of Natchitoches.

That November (1822), Taylor was transferred to the First Infantry Regiment, and sent to Baton Rouge on the Mississippi River in Louisiana. While in Baton Rouge, Taylor bought a plantation 40 miles north in 1823, and after earning an insufficient profit, Taylor bought 22 slaves in an attempt to obtain more money; however, he was sent back to Louisville in February 1824. In Louisville, Taylor was made superintendent of a recruiting service for armies based in the western United States. In late 1826, he was called to Washington, D.C., for work on an Army committee to consolidate and improve military organization. In the meantime he acquired his first Louisiana plantation and decided to move with his family to his plantation in Baton Rouge.

=== Black Hawk War ===
In May 1828, Taylor was called back to action, commanding Fort Snelling in Michigan Territory (now Minnesota) on the Upper Mississippi River for a year, and then nearby Fort Crawford, also in the Michigan Territory (now Wisconsin), in order to rebuild the previous fort, which had heavily damaged by a flood, for a year. After some time on furlough, spent expanding his landholdings, Taylor was promoted to colonel of the 1st Infantry Regiment in April 1832, when the Black Hawk War was beginning in the West. Taylor campaigned under General Henry Atkinson to pursue and later defend against Chief Black Hawk's forces throughout the summer. The end of the war in August 1832 signaled the final Indian resistance to U.S. expansion in the area.

During this period, Taylor opposed the courtship of his 17-year-old daughter Sarah Knox Taylor with Lieutenant Jefferson Davis, the future President of the Confederate States of America. He respected Davis but did not wish his daughter to become a military wife, as he knew it was a hard life for families. Davis and Sarah Taylor married in June 1835 (when she was 21), but she died three months later of malaria contracted on a visit to Davis's sister's home in St. Francisville, Louisiana.

=== Second Seminole War ===
Florida war 1837

By 1837, the Second Seminole War was underway when Taylor was directed to Florida. He built Fort Gardiner and Fort Basinger as supply depots and communication centers in support of Major General Thomas S. Jesup's campaign to penetrate deep into Seminole territory with large forces and trap the Seminoles and their allies in order to force them to fight or surrender. He engaged in battle with the Seminole Indians in the Christmas Day Battle of Lake Okeechobee, among the largest U.S.–Indian battles of the 19th century; as a result, he was promoted to brigadier general. In May 1838, Jesup stepped down and placed Taylor in command of all American troops in Florida, a position he held for two years—his reputation as a military leader was growing and he became known as "Old Rough and Ready." Taylor was criticized for using bloodhounds in order to track Seminole.

After his long-requested relief was granted, Taylor spent a comfortable year touring the nation with his family and meeting with military leaders. During this period, he began to be interested in politics and corresponded with President William Henry Harrison. He was made commander of the Second Department of the Army's Western Division in May 1841. The sizable territory ran from the Mississippi River westward, south of the 37th parallel north. Stationed in Arkansas, Taylor enjoyed several uneventful years, spending as much time attending to his land speculation as to military matters.

=== Mexican–American War ===
In anticipation of the annexation of the Republic of Texas, which had established independence in 1836, Taylor was sent in April 1844 to Fort Jesup in Louisiana, and ordered to guard against attempts by Mexico to reclaim the territory. More senior generals in the army might have taken this important command, such as Winfield Scott and Edmund P. Gaines. But both were known members of the Whig Party, and Taylor's apolitical reputation and friendly relations with Andrew Jackson made him the choice of President James K. Polk. Polk directed him to deploy into disputed territory in Texas, "on or near the Rio Grande" near Mexico. Taylor chose a spot at Corpus Christi, and his Army of Occupation encamped there until the following spring in anticipation of a Mexican attack.

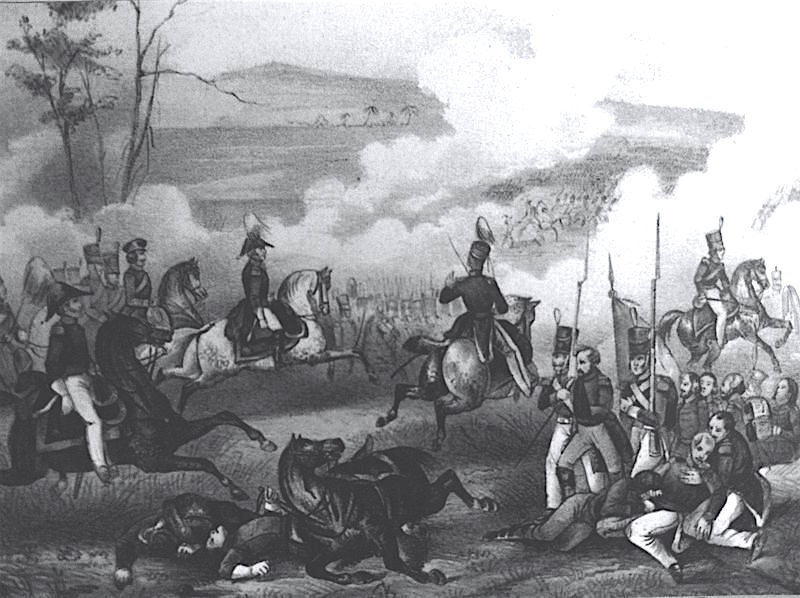
General Zachary Taylor rides his horse at the Battle of Palo Alto, May 8, 1846

When Polk's attempts to negotiate with Mexico failed, Taylor's men advanced to the Rio Grande in March 1846, and war appeared imminent. Violence broke out several weeks later, when Mexican forces attacked some of Captain Seth B. Thornton's men north of the river. Learning of the Thornton Affair, Polk told Congress in May that a war between Mexico and the U.S. had begun.

That same month, Taylor commanded American forces at the Battle of Palo Alto and the nearby Battle of Resaca de la Palma. Though greatly outnumbered, he defeated the Mexican Army of the North commanded by General Mariano Arista, and forced the troops back across the Rio Grande. Taylor was later praised for his humane treatment of the wounded Mexican soldiers before the prisoner exchange with Arista, giving them the same care as was given to American wounded. After tending to the wounded, he performed the last rites for the dead of both the American and Mexican soldiers killed during the battle.

These victories made him a popular hero, and in May 1846 Taylor received a brevet promotion to major general and a formal commendation from Congress. In June, he was promoted to the full rank of major general. The national press compared him to George Washington and Andrew Jackson, both generals who had ascended to the presidency, but Taylor denied any interest in running for office. "Such an idea never entered my head," he remarked in a letter, "nor is it likely to enter the head of any sane person."

After crossing the Rio Grande, in September Taylor inflicted heavy casualties upon the Mexicans at the Battle of Monterrey, and captured that city in three days, despite its impregnable repute. Taylor was criticized for signing a "liberal" truce rather than pressing for a large-scale surrender. Polk had hoped that the occupation of Northern Mexico would induce the Mexicans to sell Alta California and New Mexico, but the Mexicans remained unwilling to part with so much territory. Polk sent an army under the command of Winfield Scott to besiege Veracruz, an important Mexican port city, while Taylor was ordered to remain near Monterrey. Many of Taylor's experienced soldiers were placed under Scott's command, leaving Taylor with a smaller and less effective force. Mexican General Antonio López de Santa Anna intercepted a letter from Scott about Taylor's smaller force, and he moved north, intent on destroying Taylor's force before confronting Scott's army.

Learning of Santa Anna's approach, and refusing to retreat despite the Mexican army's greater numbers, Taylor established a strong defensive position near the town of Saltillo. Santa Anna attacked Taylor with 20,000 men at the Battle of Buena Vista in February 1847, leaving around 700 Americans dead or wounded at a cost of over 1,500 Mexican casualties. (Note: Estimates of casualties vary widely. The Encyclopædia Britannica lists casualties of about 1,500 Mexican to 700 American. Hamilton lists the "killed or wounded" as 673 Americans to "at least eighteen hundred" Mexicans. Bauer lists "594 killed, 1039 wounded, and 1,854 missing" on the Mexican side, with "272 killed, 387 wounded, and 6 missing" on the American side.) Outmatched, the Mexican forces retreated, ensuring a "far-reaching" victory for the Americans.

In recognition of his victory at Buena Vista, on July 4, 1847, Taylor was elected an honorary member of the New York Society of the Cincinnati, the Virginia branch of which included his father as a charter member. Taylor also was made a member of the Aztec Club of 1847, Military Society of the Mexican War. He received three Congressional Gold Medals for his service in the Mexican-American War and remains the only person to have received the medal three times.

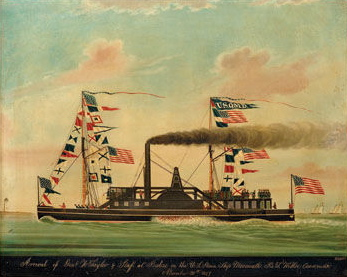
U.S. Steam Ship Monmouth returns U.S. General Zachary Taylor from victories in the war with Mexico at Balize, Louisiana, November 1847

Taylor remained at Monterrey until late November 1847, when he set sail for home. While he spent the following year in command of the Army's entire western division, his active military career was effectively over. In December he received a hero's welcome in New Orleans and Baton Rouge, setting the stage for the 1848 presidential election.

Ulysses S. Grant served under Taylor in this war and said of his style of leadership: "A better army, man for man, probably never faced an enemy than the one commanded by General Taylor in the earliest two engagements of the Mexican War."

General Taylor was not an officer to trouble the administration much with his demands but was inclined to do the best he could with the means given to him. He felt his responsibility as going no further. If he had thought that he was sent to perform an impossibility with the means given him, he would probably have informed the authorities of his opinion and left them to determine what should be done. If the judgment was against him he would have gone on and done the best he could with the means at hand without parading his grievance before the public. No soldier could face either danger or responsibility more calmly than he. These are qualities more rarely found than genius or physical courage. General Taylor never made any great show or parade, either of uniform or retinue. In dress he was possibly too plain, rarely wearing anything in the field to indicate his rank, or even that he was an officer; but he was known to every soldier in his army, and was respected by all.

== Dates of rank ==
Insignia	Rank	Component	Date
	1st Lieutenant	Regular Army	May 3, 1808
	Captain	Regular Army	November 30, 1810
	Brevet Major	Regular Army	September 5, 1812
	Major	Regular Army	May 15, 1814
	Lieutenant Colonel	Regular Army	April 20, 1819
	Colonel	Regular Army	April 4, 1832
	Brevet Brigadier-General	Regular Army	December 25, 1837
	Brevet Major General	Regular Army	May 28, 1846
	Major General	Regular Army	June 29, 1846

Note - Major General Taylor resigned his commission in the U.S. Army on January 31, 1849, shortly before he became president.

== Election of 1848 ==
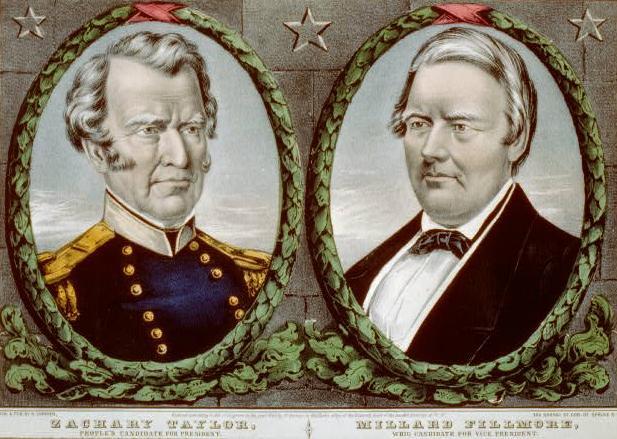
Taylor/Fillmore 1848 campaign poster

In his capacity as a career officer, Taylor had never publicly revealed his political beliefs before 1848 nor voted before that time. He was apolitical and had a negative opinion of most politicians. He thought of himself as an independent, believing in a strong and sound banking system for the country, and thought that President Andrew Jackson should not have allowed the Second Bank of the United States to collapse in 1836. He believed it was impractical to expand slavery into the Western United States, as neither cotton nor sugar (both produced in great quantities as a result of slavery) could be easily grown there through a plantation economy. He was also a firm American nationalist, and due to his experience of seeing many people die as a result of warfare, believed that secession was a bad way to resolve national problems.

Well before the American victory at Buena Vista, political clubs formed that supported Taylor for president. His support was drawn from an unusually broad assortment of political bands, including Whigs and Democrats, Northerners and Southerners, allies and opponents of national leaders such as Polk and Henry Clay. By late 1846, Taylor's opposition to a presidential run had weakened, and it became clear that his principles resembled Whig orthodoxy. Taylor despised both Polk and his policies, while the Whigs were considering nominating another war hero for the presidency after the success of its previous winning nominee, William Henry Harrison, in 1840.

As support for Taylor's candidacy grew, he continued to keep his distance from both parties, but made clear that he would have voted for Whig Henry Clay in 1844 had he voted. In a widely publicized September 1847 letter, Taylor stated his positions on several issues. He did not favor chartering another national bank, favored a low tariff, and believed that the president should play no role in making laws. Taylor did believe that the president could veto laws, but only when they were clearly unconstitutional.

Many southerners believed that Taylor supported slavery and its expansion into the new territory absorbed from Mexico, and some were angered when Taylor suggested that if elected president he would not veto the Wilmot Proviso, which proposed against such an expansion. This position did not enhance his support from activist antislavery elements in the Northern United States, as they wanted Taylor to speak out strongly in support of the Proviso, not simply fail to veto it. Most abolitionists did not support Taylor, since he was a slave-owner.

1848 electoral vote results

In February 1848, Taylor again announced that he would not accept either party's presidential nomination. His reluctance to identify himself as a Whig nearly cost him the party's presidential nomination, but Senator John J. Crittenden of Kentucky and other supporters finally convinced Taylor to declare himself a Whig. Though Clay retained a strong following among the Whigs, Whig leaders like William H. Seward and Abraham Lincoln were eager to support a war hero who could replicate the success of the party's only other successful presidential candidate, William Henry Harrison.

At the 1848 Whig National Convention, Taylor defeated Clay and Winfield Scott for the presidential nomination. For its vice-presidential nominee the convention chose Millard Fillmore, a prominent New York Whig who had chaired the House Ways and Means Committee and been a contender for the vice-presidential nominee in the 1844 election. Fillmore's selection was largely an attempt at reconciliation with northern Whigs, who were furious at the nomination of a slave-owning southerner; no faction of the party was satisfied with the final ticket. It was initially unclear whether Taylor would accept the nomination because he did not respond to the letters notifying him of the convention's outcome, because he had instructed his local post office not to deliver his mail to avoid postage fees. Taylor continued to minimize his role in the campaign, preferring not to directly meet with voters or correspond about his political views. He did little active campaigning, and may not have voted. His campaign was skillfully directed by Crittenden and bolstered by a late endorsement from Senator Daniel Webster of Massachusetts.

Democrats were even less unified than the Whigs, as former Democratic President Martin Van Buren broke from the party and led the anti-slavery Free Soil Party's ticket. Van Buren won the support of many Democrats and Whigs who opposed the extension of slavery into the territories, but he took more votes from Democratic nominee Lewis Cass in the crucial state of New York.

Nationally, Taylor defeated Cass and Van Buren, taking 163 of the 290 electoral votes. In the popular vote, he took 47.3%, to Cass's 42.5% and Van Buren's 10.1%. Taylor ignored the Whig platform, as historian Michael F. Holt explains:

Taylor was equally indifferent to programs Whigs had long considered vital. Publicly, he was artfully ambiguous, refusing to answer questions about his views on banking, the tariff, and internal improvements. Privately, he was more forthright. The idea of a national bank "is dead, and will not be revived in my time." In the future the tariff "will be increased only for revenue"; in other words, Whig hopes of restoring the protective tariff of 1842 were vain. There would never again be surplus federal funds from public land sales to distribute to the states, and internal improvements "will go on in spite of presidential vetoes." In a few words, that is, Taylor pronounced an epitaph for the entire Whig economic program.

== Presidency (1849–1850) ==
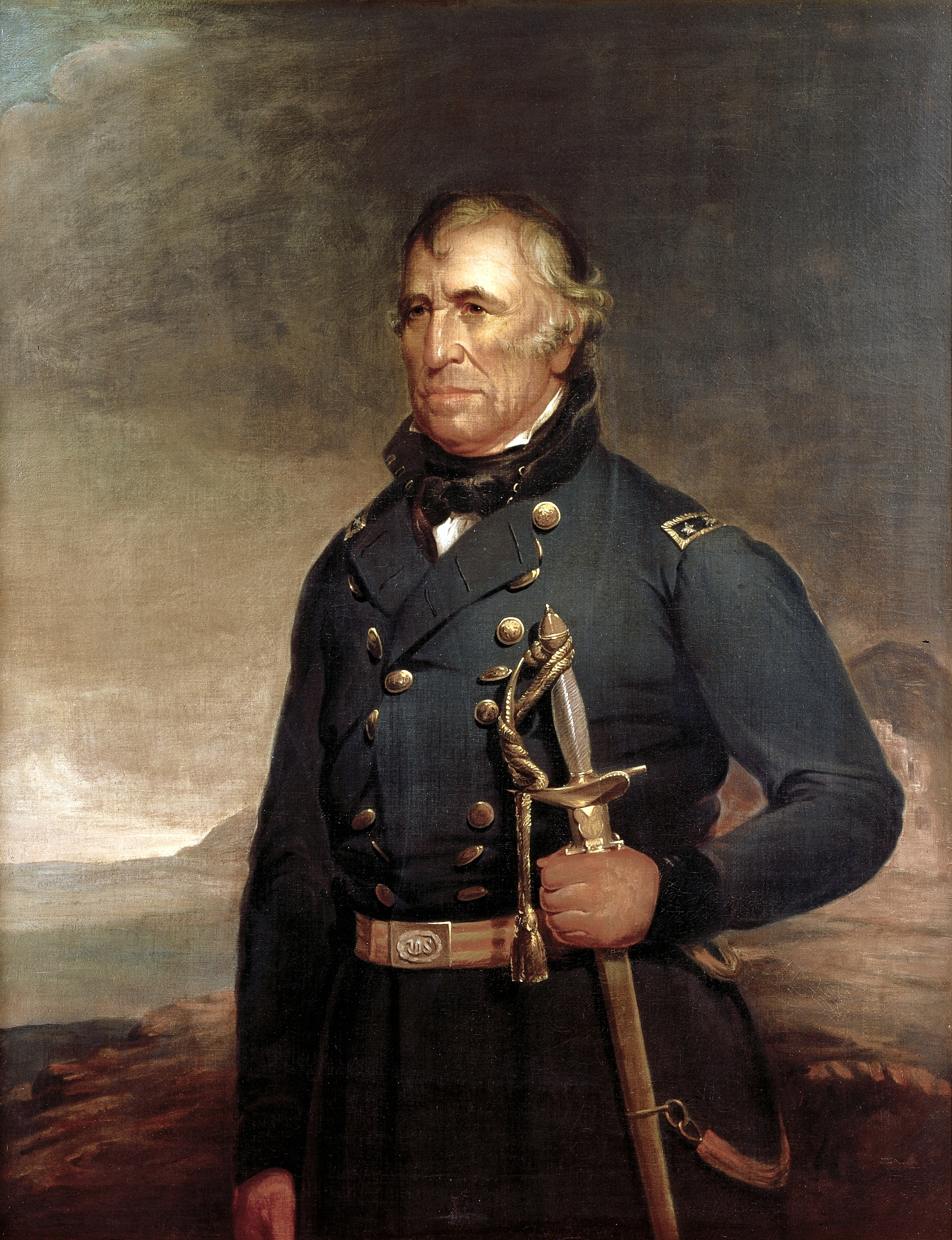
- Taylor by Joseph Henry Bush, c. 1848
- Presidency of Zachary Taylor; March 4, 1849 – July 9, 1850
- Vice President: Millard Fillmore
- Party: Whig
- Election: 1848
- Seat: White House
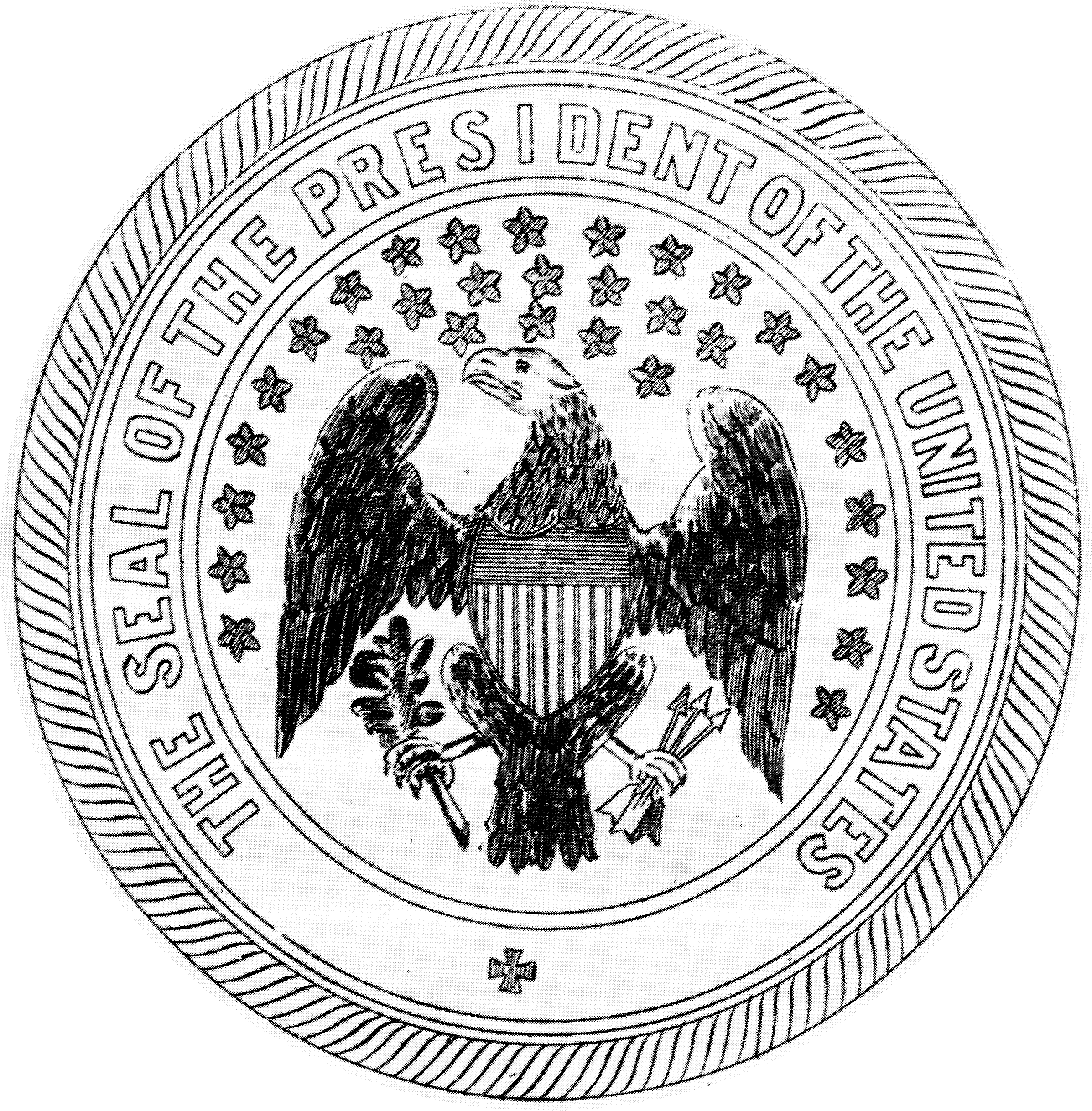
- Seal of the president (1850–1894)

=== Transition ===
As president-elect, Taylor kept his distance from Washington, not resigning his Western Division command until late January 1849. He spent the months following the election formulating his cabinet selections. He was deliberate and quiet about his decisions, to the frustration of his fellow Whigs. While he despised patronage and political games, he endured a flurry of advances from office-seekers looking to play a role in his administration.

While he would appoint no Democrats, Taylor wanted his cabinet to reflect the nation's diverse interests, and so apportioned the seats geographically. He also avoided choosing prominent Whigs, sidestepping such obvious selections as Clay. He saw Crittenden as a cornerstone of his administration, offering him the crucial seat of Secretary of State, but Crittenden insisted on serving out the governorship of Kentucky to which he had just been elected. Taylor settled on Senator John M. Clayton of Delaware, a close associate of Crittenden's.

Taylor cabinet
Office	Name	Term
President	Zachary Taylor	1849–1850
Vice President	Millard Fillmore	1849–1850
Secretary of State	John M. Clayton	1849–1850
Secretary of the Treasury	William M. Meredith	1849–1850
Secretary of War	George W. Crawford	1849–1850
Attorney General	Reverdy Johnson	1849–1850
Postmaster General	Jacob Collamer	1849–1850
Secretary of the Navy	William Ballard Preston	1849–1850
Secretary of the Interior	Thomas Ewing	1849–1850

With Clayton's aid, Taylor chose the six remaining members of his cabinet. One of the incoming Congress's first actions would be to establish the Department of the Interior, so Taylor would be appointing that department's inaugural secretary. Thomas Ewing, who had previously served as a senator from Ohio and as Secretary of the Treasury under William Henry Harrison, accepted the patronage-rich position of Secretary of the Interior. For the position of Postmaster General, also a center of patronage, Taylor chose Congressman Jacob Collamer of Vermont.

After Horace Binney refused appointment as Secretary of the Treasury, Taylor chose another prominent Philadelphian, William M. Meredith. George W. Crawford, a former governor of Georgia, accepted the position of Secretary of War, while Congressman William B. Preston of Virginia became Secretary of the Navy. Senator Reverdy Johnson of Maryland accepted appointment as Attorney General, and became one of the most influential members of Taylor's cabinet. Fillmore was not in favor with Taylor, and was largely sidelined throughout Taylor's presidency.

Taylor began his trek to Washington in late January, a journey rife with bad weather, delays, injuries, sickness and an attempted abduction by a family friend at Ashland in Mississippi. Taylor finally arrived in the nation's capital on February 24 and soon met with the outgoing President Polk. Polk held a low opinion of Taylor, privately deeming him "without political information" and "wholly unqualified for the station" of president. Taylor spent the next week meeting with political elites, some of whom were unimpressed with his appearance and demeanor. With less than two weeks until his inauguration, he met with Clayton and hastily finalized his cabinet.

=== Inauguration ===
Taylor's term as president began on Sunday, March 4, but his inauguration was not held until the next day out of religious concerns. (Note: Folklore holds that David Rice Atchison, as president pro tempore of the Senate, unknowingly succeeded to the presidency for this day, but no major sources accept this view.) His inauguration speech discussed the many tasks facing the nation, but presented a governing style of deference to Congress and sectional compromise instead of assertive executive action. His speech also emphasized the importance of following President Washington's precedent in avoiding entangling alliances.

During the period after his inauguration, Taylor made time to meet with numerous office-seekers and other ordinary citizens who desired his attention. He also attended an unusual number of funerals, including services for Polk and Dolley Madison. According to Eisenhower, Taylor coined the phrase "First Lady" in his eulogy for Madison. In the summer of 1849, Taylor toured the Northeastern United States to familiarize himself with a region of which he had seen little. He spent much of the trip plagued by gastrointestinal illness and returned to Washington by September.

=== Sectional crisis ===
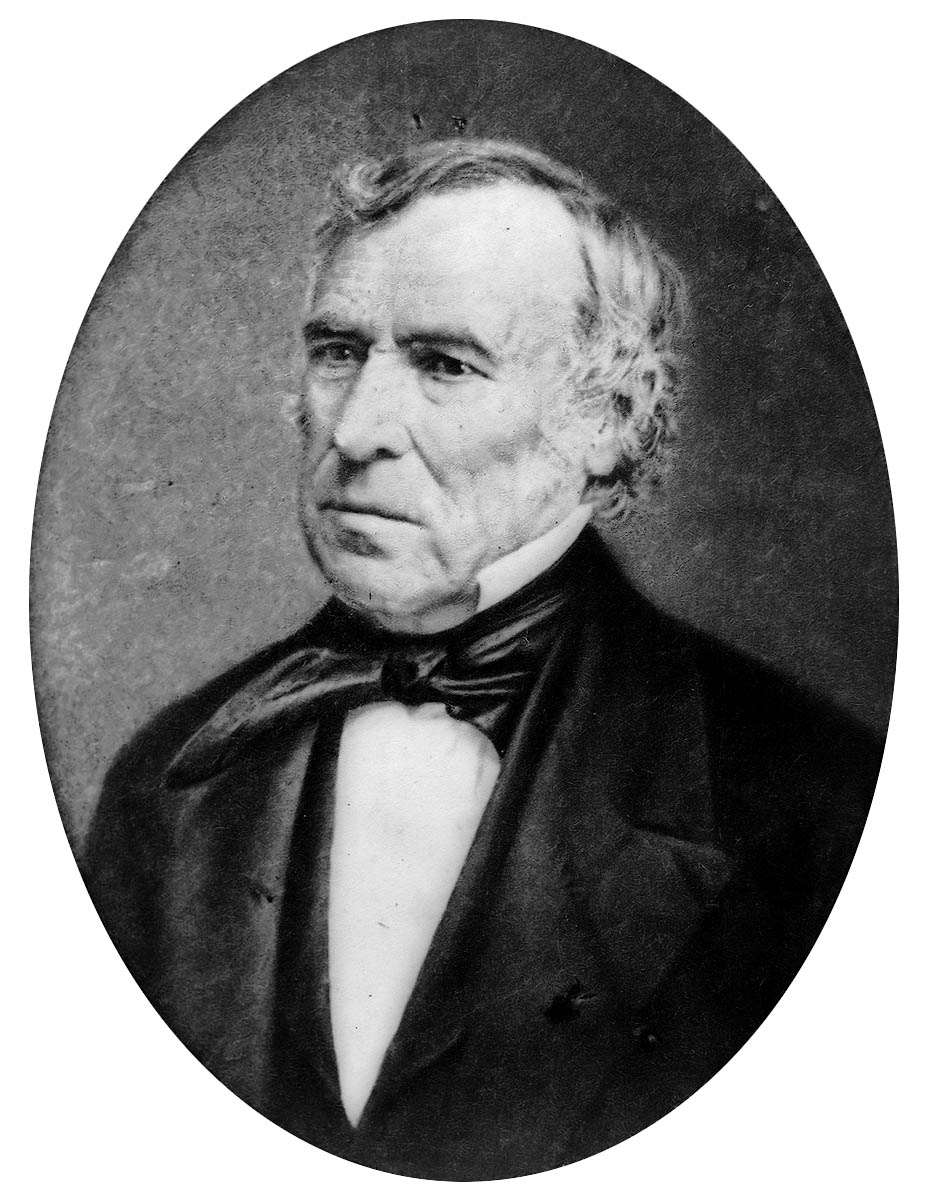
Daguerreotype of Taylor by Mathew Brady, 1849

As Taylor took office, Congress faced a battery of questions related to the Mexican Cession, acquired by the U.S. after the Mexican War and divided into military districts. It was unclear which districts would be established into states and which would become federal territories, while the question of their slave status threatened to bitterly divide Congress. Southerners objected to the admission of the California Territory, the New Mexico Territory, and the Utah Territory to the Union as free states despite California's demographic and economic growth. Additionally, Southerners had grown increasingly angry about the aid that Northerners had given to fugitive slaves after Prigg v. Pennsylvania allowed slave catchers to capture alleged runaway slaves in free states, and that Northern authorities frequently refused to enforce the Fugitive Slave Act of 1793. At the same time, northerners demanded the abolition of the domestic slave trade in Washington, D.C. Finally, Texas claimed parts of eastern New Mexico and threatened to send its state militia to militarily enforce its territorial claims.

While a Southern slaveowner himself, Taylor believed that slavery was economically infeasible in the Mexican Cession, and so opposed slavery in those territories as a needless source of controversy. His major goal was sectional peace, preserving the Union through legislative compromise. As the threat of Southern secession grew, he sided increasingly with antislavery Northerners such as Senator William H. Seward of New York, even suggesting that he would sign the Wilmot Proviso to ban slavery in federal territories should such a bill reach his desk.

In Taylor's view, the best way forward was to admit California as a state rather than a federal territory, as it would leave the slavery question out of Congress's hands. The timing for statehood was in Taylor's favor, as the California Gold Rush was well underway at the time of his inauguration, and California's population was exploding. The administration dispatched Representative Thomas Butler King to California, to test the waters and advocate statehood, knowing that Californians were certain to adopt an anti-slavery constitution. King found that a constitutional convention was already underway, and by October 1849, the convention unanimously agreed to join the Union—and to ban slavery within their borders.

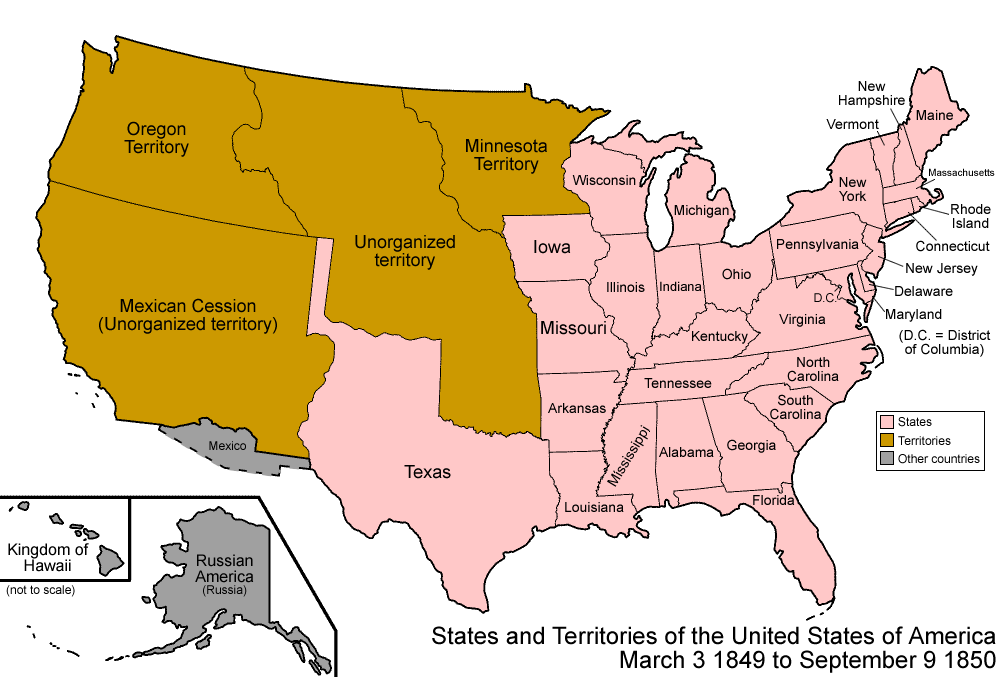
United States states (Texas border unsettled, California admitted in 1850) and territories during Taylor's presidency

The question of the New Mexico–Texas border was unsettled at the time of Taylor's inauguration. The territory newly won from Mexico was under federal jurisdiction, but the Texans claimed a swath of land north of Santa Fe and were determined to include it within their borders, despite having no significant presence there. Taylor sided with the New Mexicans' claim, initially pushing to keep it as a federal territory, but eventually supported statehood so as to further reduce the slavery debate in Congress. The Texas government, under newly instated governor P. Hansborough Bell, tried to ramp up military action in defense of the territory against the federal government, but was unsuccessful.

The Latter Day Saint (Mormon) settlers of modern-day Utah had established a provisional State of Deseret, an enormous swath of territory that had little hope of recognition by Congress. The Taylor administration considered combining the California and Utah territories but instead opted to organize the Utah Territory. To alleviate the Mormon concerns over religious freedom, Taylor promised they would have relative independence from Congress despite being a federal territory.

Taylor sent his only State of the Union report to Congress in December 1849. He recapped international events and suggested several adjustments to tariff policy and executive organization, but the sectional crisis facing Congress overshadowed such issues. He reported on California's and New Mexico's applications for statehood, and recommended that Congress approve them as written and "should abstain from the introduction of those exciting topics of a sectional character". The policy report was prosaic and unemotional, but ended with a sharp condemnation of secessionists. It had no effect on Southern legislators, who saw the admission of two free states as an existential threat, and Congress remained stalled.

=== Foreign affairs ===
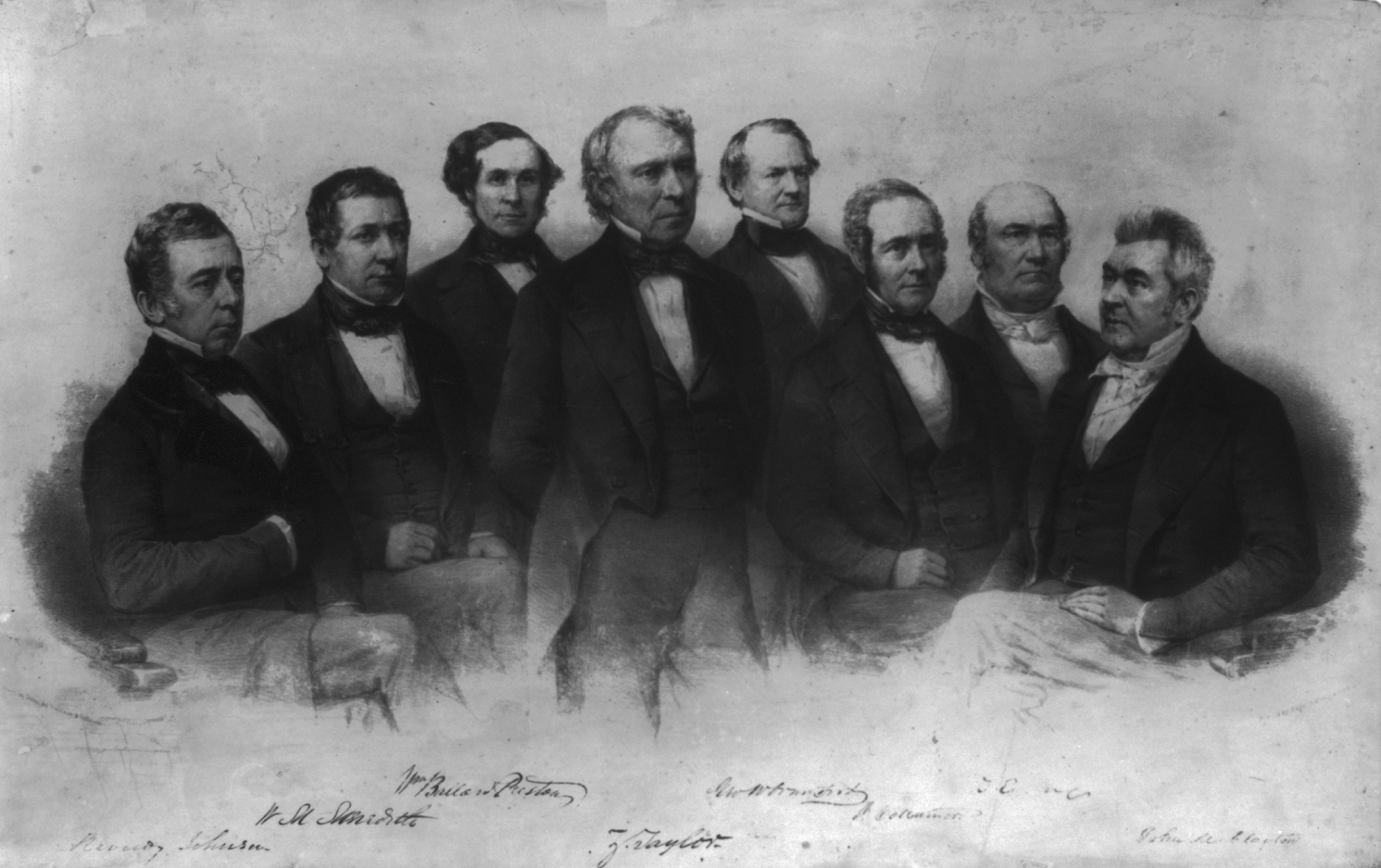
President Zachary Taylor standing in front of his Cabinet, seated from left: Reverdy Johnson, Attorney General; William M. Meredith, Secretary of the Treasury; William B. Preston, Secretary of the Navy; George W. Crawford, Secretary of War; Jacob Collamer, Postmaster General; Thomas Ewing, Secretary of the Interior; and John M. Clayton, Secretary of State. Lithograph by Francis D'Avignon, published by Mathew Brady, 1849.

Taylor and his Secretary of State, John M. Clayton, both lacked diplomatic experience and came into office at a relatively uneventful time in American–international politics. Their shared nationalism allowed Taylor to devolve foreign policy matters to Clayton with minimal oversight, although no decisive foreign policy was established under their administration. As opponents of the autocratic European order, they vocally supported German and Hungarian liberals in the revolutions of 1848, although they offered nothing in the way of aid.

A perceived insult from the French minister Guillaume Tell Poussin nearly led to a break in diplomatic relations until Poussin was replaced, and a reparation dispute with Portugal resulted in harsh words from the Taylor administration. In a more positive effort, the administration arranged for two ships to assist in the United Kingdom's search for a team of British explorers, led by John Franklin, who had gotten lost in the Arctic. While previous Whig administrations had emphasized Pacific trade as an economic imperative, the Taylor administration took no major initiative in the Far East.

Throughout 1849 and 1850, they contended with Narciso López, the Venezuelan radical who led repeated filibustering expeditions in an attempt to conquer the Spanish Captaincy General of Cuba. The annexation of Cuba was the object of fascination among many in the South, who saw in Cuba a potential new slave state, and López had several prominent Southern supporters. López made generous offers to United States Armed Forces leaders to support him, but Taylor and Clayton saw the enterprise as illegal. They issued a blockade, and later, authorized a mass arrest of López and his fellows, although the group would eventually be acquitted. They also confronted Spain, which had arrested several Americans on the charge of piracy, but the Spaniards eventually surrendered them to maintain good relations with the U.S.

Arguably the Taylor administration's definitive accomplishment in foreign policy was the Clayton–Bulwer Treaty of 1850, regarding a proposed inter-oceanic canal through Central America. While the U.S. and Britain were on friendly terms, and the construction of such a canal was decades away from reality, the mere possibility put the two nations in an uneasy position. For several years, Britain had been seizing strategic points, particularly the Mosquito Coast on the eastern coast of present-day Nicaragua. Negotiations were held with Britain that resulted in the landmark Clayton–Bulwer Treaty. Both nations agreed not to claim control of any canal that might be built in Nicaragua. The treaty promoted the development of an Anglo-American alliance; its completion was Taylor's last action as president.

=== Compromise attempts and final days ===
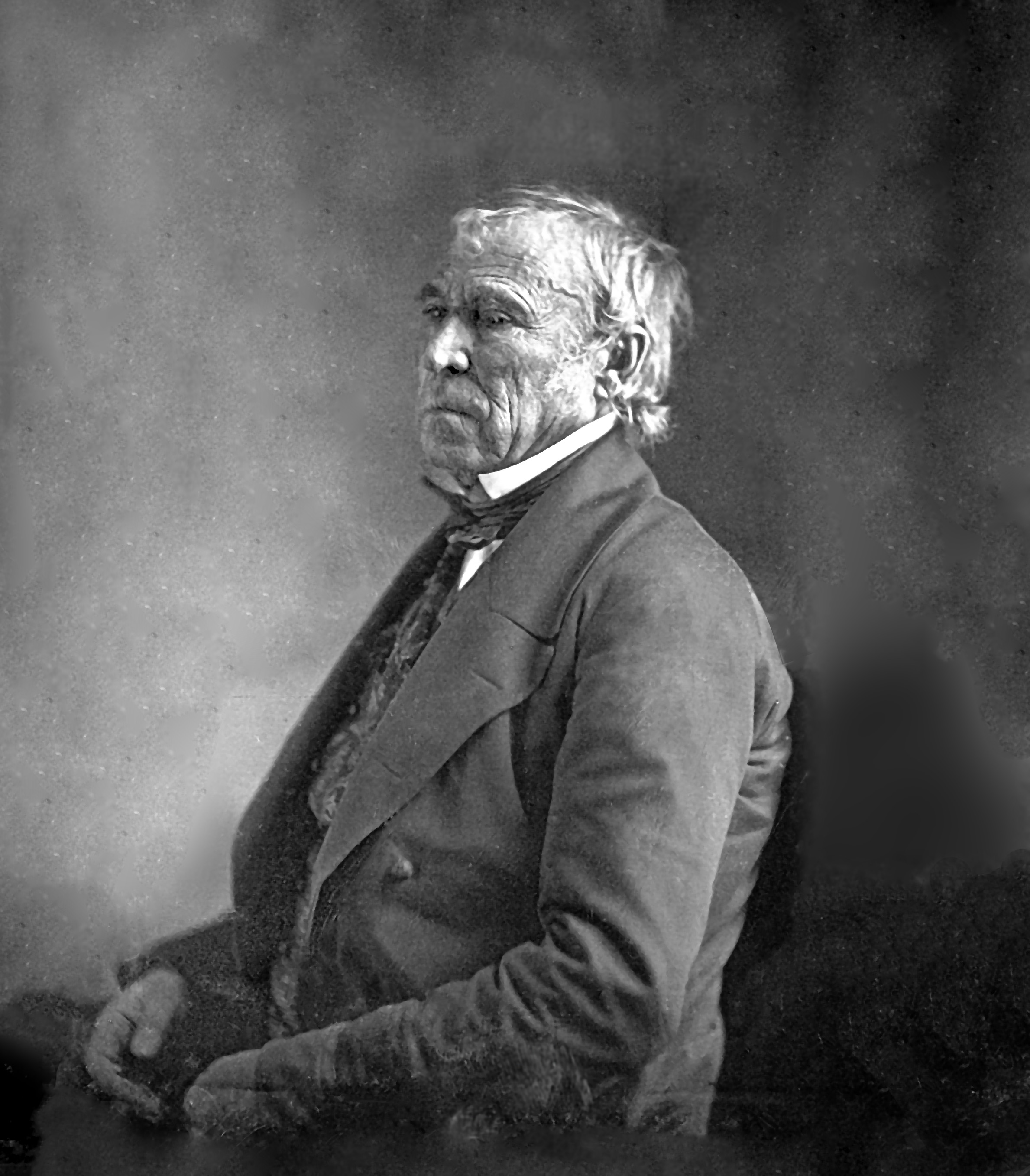
Daguerreotype of Taylor by Mathew Brady, c. 1849

Clay took a central role as Congress debated slavery. While his positions overlapped somewhat with Taylor's, the president always maintained his distance from Clay. Historians disagree on his motivations for doing so. This caused Taylor to become politically isolated as Southerners disapproved of his preference to appoint the territories of the Mexican Cession as free states while Northerners disapproved of his opposition to Clay's legislative agenda. As a result, Congress increasingly ignored Taylor while drafting a compromise. With assistance from Daniel Webster, Clay developed his landmark proposal, the Compromise of 1850. The proposal allowed statehood for California, giving it independence on the slavery question, while the other territories would remain under federal jurisdiction. This included the disputed parts of New Mexico, although Texas would be reimbursed for the territory.

Slavery would be retained in the District of Columbia, but the slave trade would be banned. Meanwhile, a strict Fugitive Slave Law would be enacted, bypassing northern legislation which had restricted Southerners from retrieving runaway slaves.

Tensions flared as Congress negotiated and secession talks grew, culminating with a threat from Taylor to send troops into New Mexico to protect its border from Texas, with himself leading the army. The crisis escalated after delegates in New Mexico proposed a new state constitution that would have banned slavery and Peter Hansborough Bell won the 1849 Texas gubernatorial election on a pledge to order a militia invasion of New Mexico. Southern senators accused Taylor of secretly sending the U.S. Army to New Mexico; Taylor denied the allegations but emphasized that he would like to. He also said that anyone "taken in rebellion against the Union, he would hang ... with less reluctance than he had hanged deserters and spies in Mexico."

The omnibus law was a major step forward on these issues but ultimately could not pass, due to radicals on both sides and Taylor's opposition. At this point, Taylor began to receive disapproval from even his own political allies. Secretary of War Crawford warned Taylor he would not approve a military deployment to New Mexico, although Taylor said he would give the order himself. Taylor's close advisors Robert Toombs and Alexander Stephens, both Southern Whigs who later served as officials in the Confederate government, warned him that his rhetoric on New Mexico would drive Southerners out of the party.

No great compromise reached Taylor's desk during his presidency; instead, his last days were overshadowed by the Galphin affair. Before joining the Taylor cabinet, Crawford had served as a lawyer. He had been involved in a 15-year case, representing the descendants of a colonial trader whose services to the British crown had not been repaid at the time of the American Revolution. The British debt to George Galphin was to be assumed by the federal government, but Galphin's heirs received payment on the debt's principal only after years of litigation, and were unable to win an interest payment from the Polk administration.

Treasury Secretary Meredith, with the support of Attorney General Johnson, finally signed off on the payment in April 1850. To Taylor's embarrassment, the payment included a legal compensation of nearly $100,000 to Crawford; two cabinet members had effectively offered a tremendous chunk of the public treasury to another. A House investigation cleared Crawford of any legal wrongdoing, but nonetheless expressed disapproval of his accepting the payment. Taylor, who had already been sketching a reorganization of his cabinet, now had an unfolding scandal to complicate the situation. The House of Representatives voted to censure Taylor, and newspapers of both parties began calling for his impeachment.

=== Judicial appointments ===
Judicial appointments
Court	Name	Term
W.D. La.	Henry Boyce	1849–1861 (Note: Recess appointment; formally nominated on December 21, 1849, confirmed by the United States Senate on August 2, 1850, and received commission on August 2, 1850.)
D. Ill.	Thomas Drummond	1850–1855
N.D. Ala. M.D. Ala. S.D. Ala.	John Gayle	1849–1859
D. Ark.	Daniel Ringo	1849–1851 (Note: Recess appointment; formally nominated on December 21, 1849, confirmed by the United States Senate on June 10, 1850, and received commission on June 10, 1850.)

== Death ==
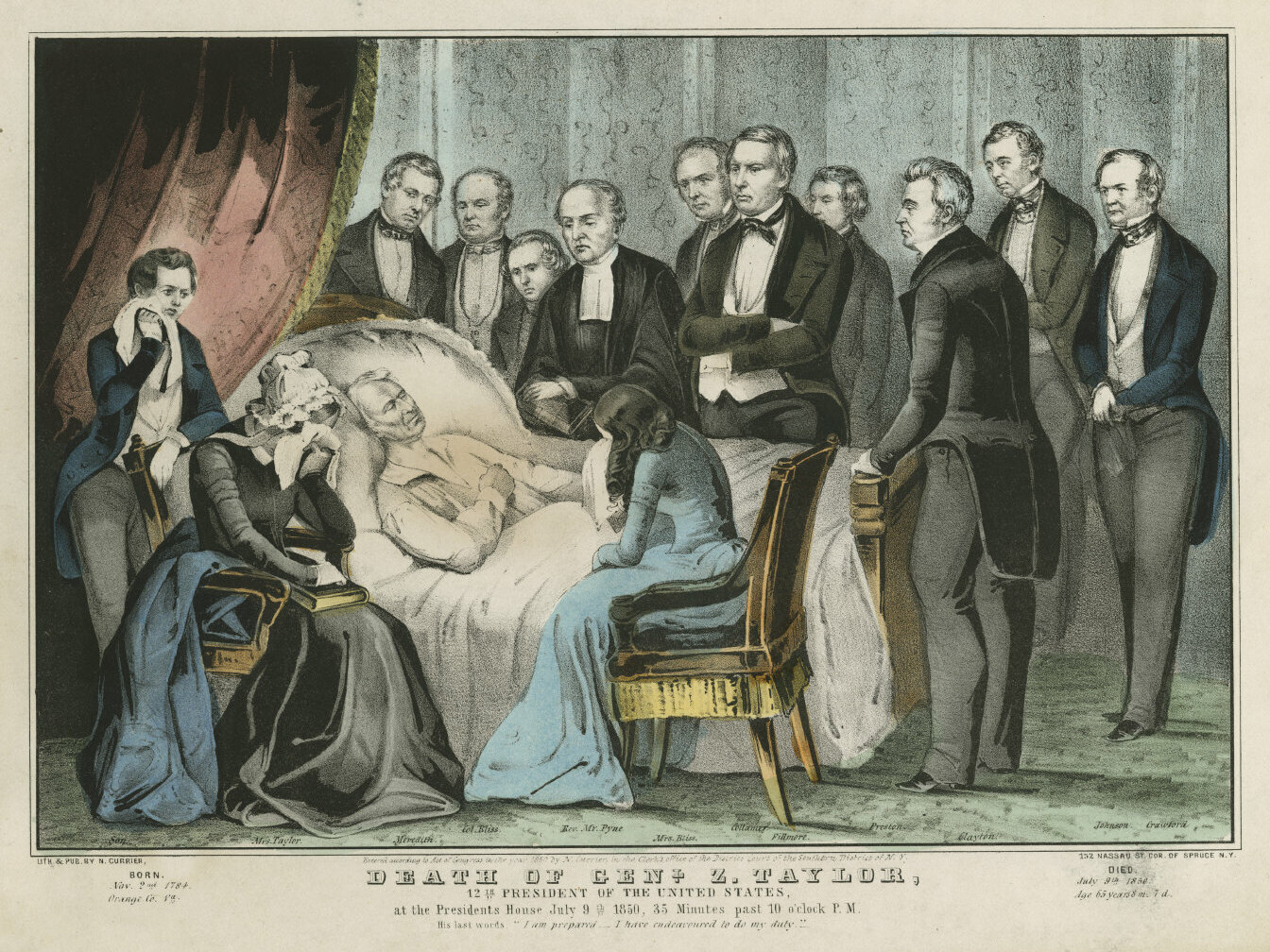
An 1850 print depicting the death of Zachary Taylor

On July 4, 1850, Taylor reportedly consumed copious amounts of cherries and iced milk while attending holiday celebrations during a fundraising event at the Washington Monument, which was then under construction. Over the course of several days, he became severely ill with an unknown digestive ailment initially resembling acute gastroenteritis. The illness initially seemed mild, and on the first day Taylor felt well enough to continue working. His condition worsened thereafter. His army physician Alexander S. Wotherspoon "diagnosed the illness as cholera morbus, a flexible mid-nineteenth-century term for intestinal ailments as diverse as diarrhea and dysentery but not related to Asiatic cholera", the latter a widespread epidemic prevalent in Washington, D.C., at the time of Taylor's death. The identity and source of Taylor's illness are the subject of historical speculation, although it is known that several of his cabinet members had come down with a similar illness.

Fever ensued and Taylor's chance of recovery was small. On July 8, Taylor remarked to a medical attendant:

I should not be surprised if this were to terminate in my death. I did not expect to encounter what has beset me since my elevation to the Presidency. God knows I have endeavored to fulfill what I conceived to be an honest duty. But I have been mistaken. My motives have been misconstrued, and my feelings most grossly outraged.

Taylor died at 10:35 p.m. on July 9, 1850. He was 65 years old. After his death, Vice President Fillmore assumed the presidency and completed Taylor's term, which ended on March 4, 1853. Soon after taking office, Fillmore signed into law the Compromise of 1850, with the aim of settling many of the issues the Taylor administration faced.

A Joint Special Committee was appointed by the Common Council of the city of New York to make the arrangements for Taylor's funeral, which took place in New York City on July 23, 1850. A procession moved from the Park and proceeded down Broadway, to Chatham Street to the Bowery; down to Union Square; and then in front of the City Hall. The procession included the firing of three volleys by the 7th National Guard Regiment. There were 30 pallbearers, which was the number of states in the Union at that time. Taylor was buried in an airtight Fisk metallic burial case with a glass window plate for viewing the deceased's face. He was interred in the Public Vault of the Congressional Cemetery in Washington, D.C., from July 13 to October 25, 1850. (Note: The Public Vault was built in 1835 to hold the remains of notables until either the grave site could be prepared, or transportation could be arranged to another city.) His body was transported to the Taylor family plot, where his parents were buried, on the old Taylor homestead plantation known as "Springfield" in Louisville, Kentucky.

=== Assassination theories ===
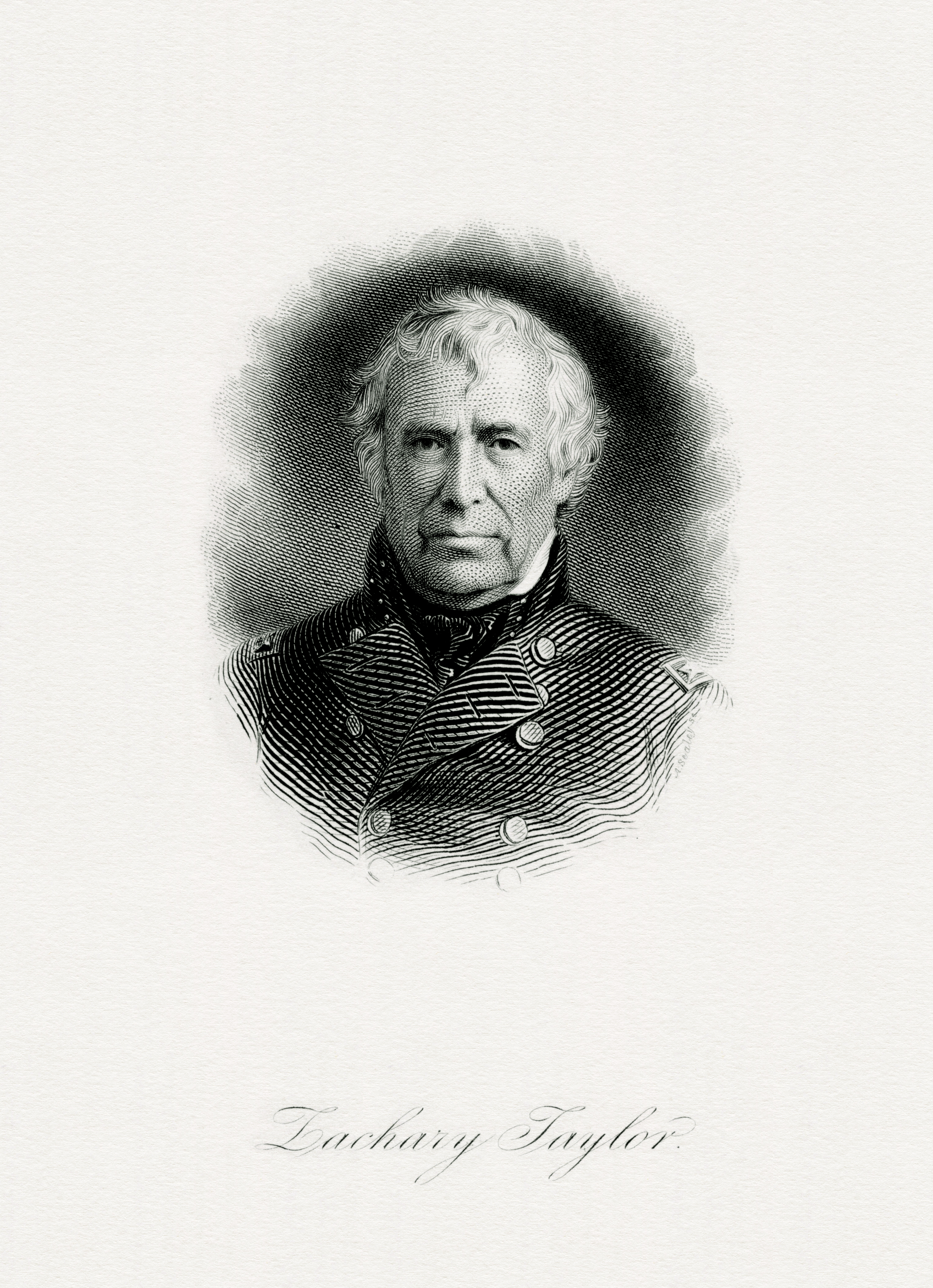
B.E.P. engraved portrait

Almost immediately after his death, rumors began to circulate that Taylor had been poisoned by pro-slavery Southerners or Catholics, and similar theories persisted into the 21st century. A few weeks after Taylor's death, President Fillmore received a letter alleging that Taylor had been poisoned by a Jesuit lay official. In 1978, Hamilton Smith based his assassination theory on the timing of drugs, the lack of confirmed cholera outbreaks, and other material. Theories that Taylor had been murdered grew after the assassination of Abraham Lincoln in 1865. In 1881, John Bingham, well known for serving as the Judge Advocate General at the Lincoln assassination trial, wrote an editorial in The New York Times alleging that Jefferson Davis had poisoned Taylor.

In the late 1980s, Clara Rising, a former professor at the University of Florida, persuaded Taylor's closest living relative to agree to an exhumation so that his remains could be tested. The remains were exhumed and transported to the Office of the Kentucky Chief Medical Examiner on June 17, 1991. Samples of hair, fingernail, and other tissues were removed, and radiological studies were conducted. The remains were returned to the cemetery and reinterred, with appropriate honors, in the mausoleum.

Neutron activation analysis conducted at Oak Ridge National Laboratory revealed no evidence of poisoning, as arsenic levels were several hundred times lower than necessary. The analysis concluded Taylor had contracted "cholera morbus, or acute gastroenteritis", as Washington had open sewers, and his food or drink may have been contaminated. Any potential for recovery was overwhelmed by his doctors, who treated him with "ipecac, calomel, opium, and quinine" at 40 grains per dose (approximately 2.6 grams), and "bled and blistered him too." A 2010 review concludes: "there is no definitive proof that Taylor was assassinated, nor would it appear that there is definitive proof that he was not."

== Historical reputation and memorials ==
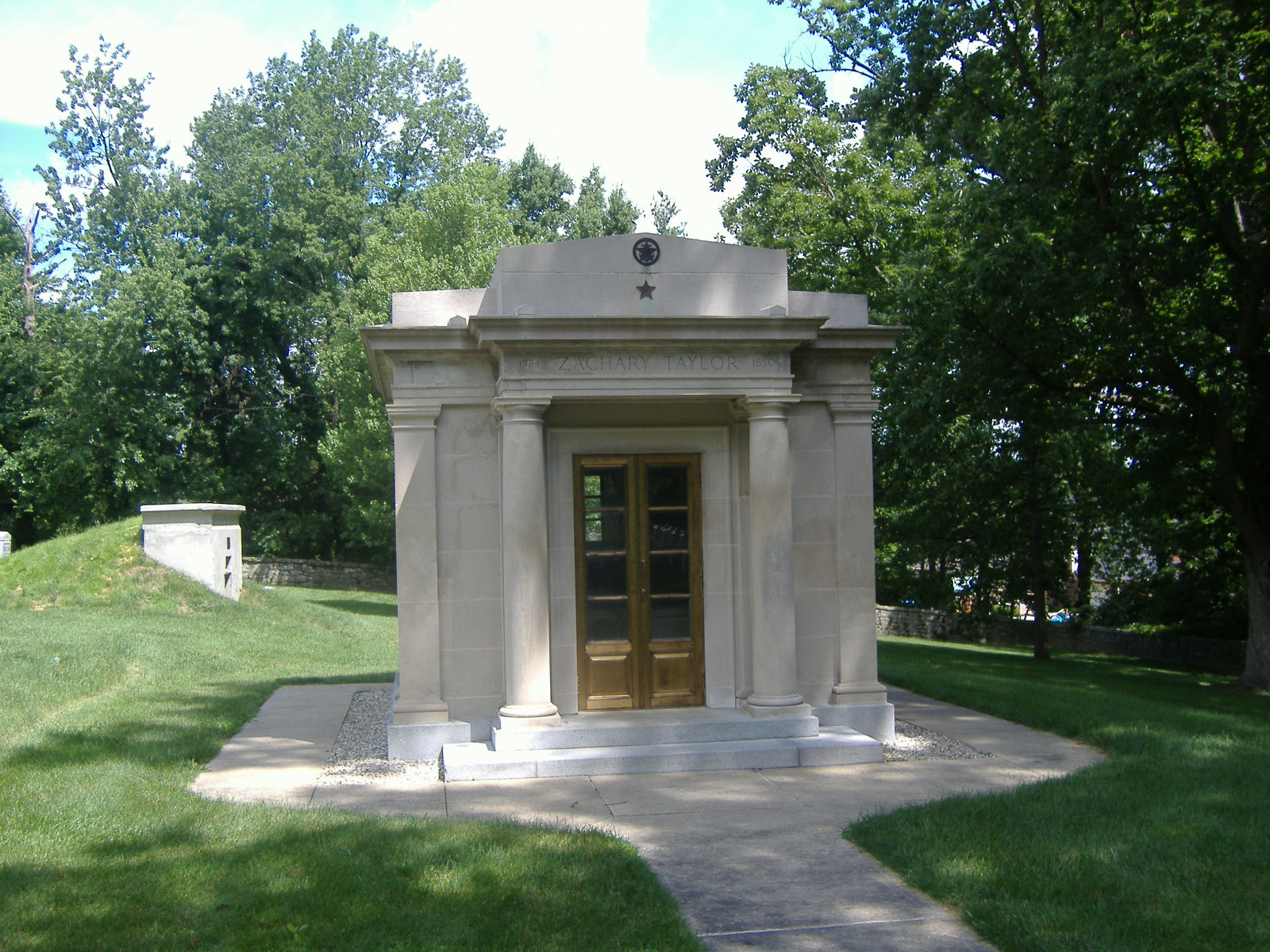
Taylor's mausoleum at the Zachary Taylor National Cemetery in Louisville, Kentucky

Because of his short tenure, Taylor is not considered to have strongly influenced the office of the presidency or the United States. Some historians believe that he was too inexperienced with politics at a time when officials needed close ties with political operatives. Despite his shortcomings, the Clayton–Bulwer Treaty affecting relations with Great Britain in Central America is "recognized as an important step in scaling down the nation's commitment to Manifest Destiny as a policy." Historical rankings of presidents of the United States have generally placed Taylor in the bottom quarter.

Taylor was the last president to own slaves while in office. He was the third of four Whig presidents, (Note: This numbering includes John Tyler, who served as vice president under the Whig William Henry Harrison but was expelled from his party shortly after becoming president.) the last being Fillmore, his successor. Taylor was also the second president to die in office, preceded by William Henry Harrison, who died while serving as president nine years earlier.

In 1883, the Commonwealth of Kentucky placed a 50-foot monument topped by a life-sized statue of Taylor near his grave. By the 1920s, the Taylor family initiated the effort to turn the Taylor burial grounds into a national cemetery. The Commonwealth of Kentucky donated two adjacent parcels of land for the project, turning the half-acre Taylor family cemetery into 16 acres (65,000 m^{2}). On May 5, 1926, the remains of Taylor and his wife (who died in 1852) were moved to the newly constructed Taylor mausoleum, made of limestone with a granite base and marble interior, nearby. The cemetery property was designated as the Zachary Taylor National Cemetery by Secretary of War Dwight F. Davis on March 12, 1928.

The U.S. Post Office released the first postage stamp issue honoring Taylor on June 21, 1875, 25 years after his death. In 1938, Taylor again appeared on a U.S. postage stamp, this time the 12-cent Presidential Issue of 1938. His last appearance (to date, 2010) on a U.S. postage stamp occurred in 1986, when he was honored on the AMERIPEX presidential issue. After Washington, Jefferson, Jackson and Lincoln, Taylor was the fifth American president to appear on U.S. postage.

The sea shanty "General Taylor" recounts Taylor's victory at the Battle of Buena Vista during the Mexican-American War. It has been recorded by groups such as Steeleye Span on Ten Man Mop, or Mr. Reservoir Butler Rides Again; Fairport Convention on The Bonny Bunch of Roses; Great Big Sea on Play; and The Longest Johns on Between Wind and Water.

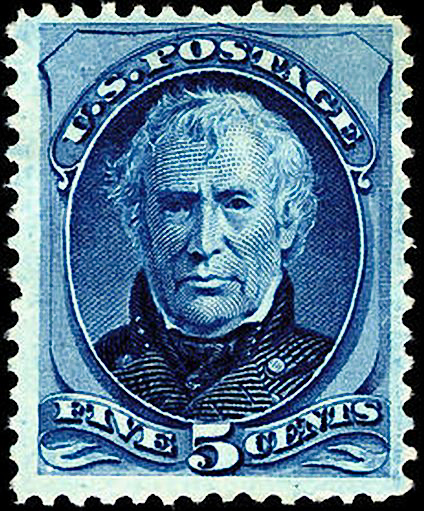
Postage stamp, issue of 1875

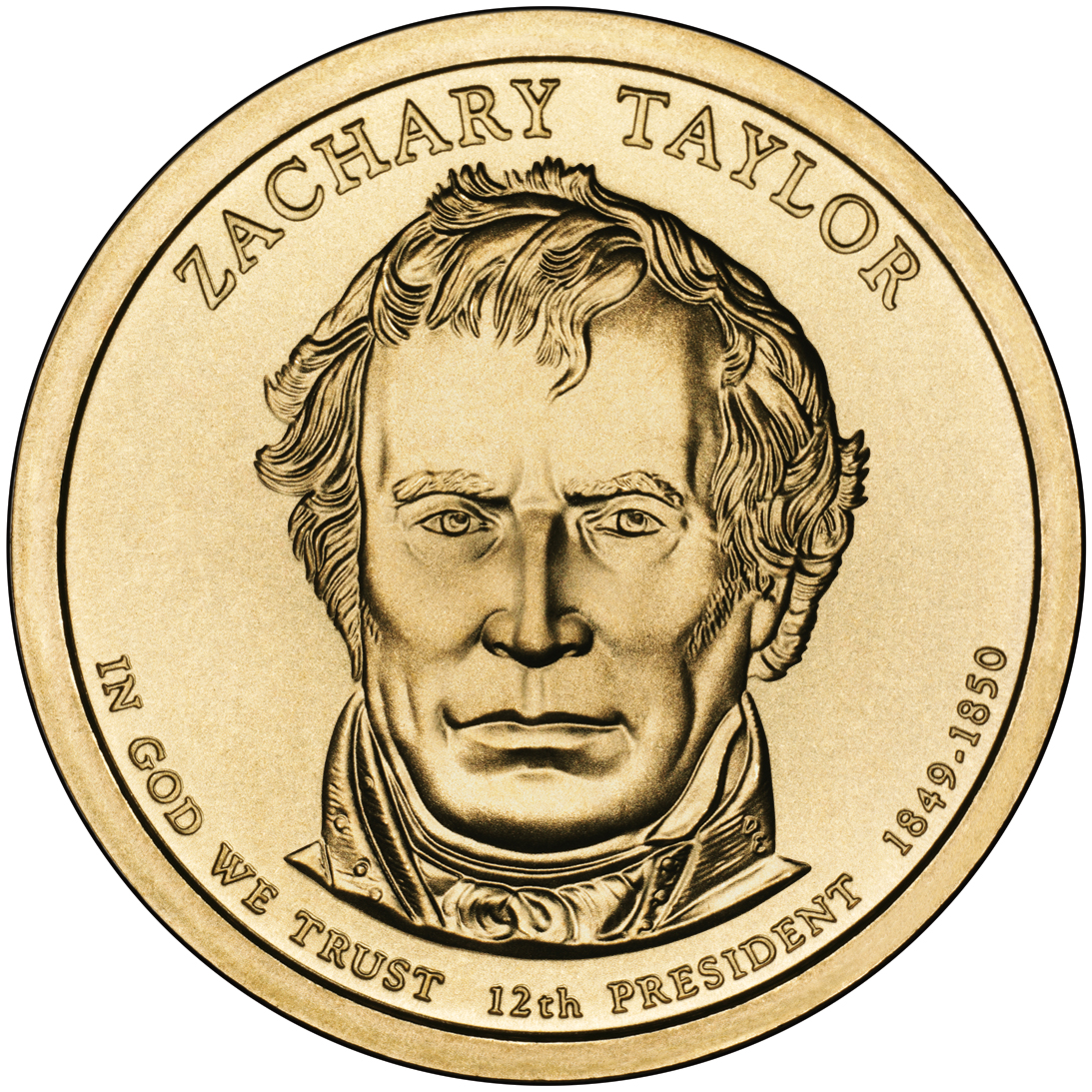
Presidential dollar coin, 2009

Taylor is the namesake of several entities and places around the nation, including:

- Camp Taylor in Kentucky and Fort Zachary Taylor in Florida
- The SS Zachary Taylor, a World War II Liberty ship
- Zachary Taylor Parkway in Louisiana and Zachary Taylor Hall at Southeastern Louisiana University
- Taylor County, Florida
- Taylor County, Georgia
- Taylor County, Iowa
- Taylor County, Kentucky
- Rough and Ready, California; the historical origin of the town is depicted in a 1965 episode of the syndicated western television series Death Valley Days.
- Zachary Taylor Highway in Virginia
- Taylor, Michigan
- Taylor Street, Savannah, Georgia.

Taylor was also the namesake of architect Zachary Taylor Davis.

== See also ==
- Historical rankings of presidents of the United States
- List of presidents of the United States
- List of presidents of the United States by previous experience
- List of presidents of the United States who died in office
- List of presidents of the United States who owned slaves
- List of unsolved deaths
- Presidents of the United States on U.S. postage stamps

== Bibliography ==
=== General biographies ===
- Bauer, K. Jack (1985). Zachary Taylor: Soldier, Planter, Statesman of the Old Southwest. Baton Rouge, Louisiana: Louisiana State University Press. ISBN 978-0-8071-1237-3. OCLC 12052294.
- Eisenhower, John S.D. (2008). Zachary Taylor. The American Presidents series. Times Books (Macmillan). ISBN 978-0-8050-8237-1.
- Fry, Joseph Reese (2009) [1848]. A Life of Gen. Zachary Taylor. Bedford, MA: Applewood Books. ISBN 978-1-4290-2125-8. Archived from the original on January 30, 2024.
- Hamilton, Holman (1941). Zachary Taylor: Soldier of the Republic. Vol. 1. Indianapolis, Ind.: Bobbs-Merrill Company.
- Hamilton, Holman (1951). Zachary Taylor: Soldier in the White House. Vol. 2. Indianapolis, Ind.: Bobbs-Merrill Company.

=== Political and military history ===
- Birkner, Michael J. "Zachary Taylor in Office: Clay, the Whig Party, and the Sectional Crisis". in A Companion to the Antebellum Presidents 1837–1861 (2014): 291–308.
- Kennedy, David M.; Bailey, Thomas Andrew & Cohen, Lizabeth (2006). The American Pageant (13th ed.). Boston: Houghton Mifflin. ISBN 0618479279. OCLC 846067545.
- Dyer, Brainerd (1946). Zachary Taylor. Southern Biography series. Louisiana State University Press.
- Holt, Michael F (1999). The Rise and Fall of the American Whig Party: Jacksonian Politics and the Onset of the Civil War. Oxford University Press. ISBN 978-0-19-505544-3.
- Lewis, Felice Flanery. Trailing Clouds of Glory: Zachary Taylor's Mexican War Campaign and His Emerging Civil War Leaders, (2010) online review Archived January 15, 2022, at the Wayback Machine
- Lewis, Felice Flanery. "Zachary Taylor and Monterrey: Generals as Diplomats". in The Routledge Handbook of American Military and Diplomatic History (Routledge, 2014) pp. 281–289.
- Lossing, Benson J (1888). The American nation: its executive, legislative, political, financial, judicial and industrial history : embracing sketches of the lives of its chief magistrates, its eminent statesmen, financiers, soldiers and jurists, with monographs on subjects of peculiar historical interest, Volume 2. Williams Publishing Co.
- Nevins, Allan. Ordeal of the Union, vol. 1: Fruits of Manifest Destiny, 1847–1852 (1947), covers politics in depth. Online free to borrow
- Quist, John W. "The Election of 1848". in American Presidential Campaigns and Elections (Routledge, 2020) pp. 328–348.
- Smith, Elbert B. (1988). The Presidencies of Zachary Taylor and Millard Fillmore. University Press of Kansas. ISBN 978-0-7006-0362-6.
- Smith, Elbert B. (2011). President Zachary Taylor : the hero president. New York: Nova Science Pub Inc. ISBN 978-1608769124.

Military offices
New office	Commander of the Army of Occupation; 1845–1848	Succeeded by William Davenport
Party political offices
Preceded by Henry Clay	Whig nominee for President of the United States; 1848	Succeeded by Winfield Scott
Political offices
Preceded by James K. Polk	President of the United States; 1849–1850	Succeeded by Millard Fillmore
