= Cypress Grove Plantation =

Zachary Taylor's plantation, Jefferson Co. Mississippi

Coordinates: 31.818216°N 91.327018°W

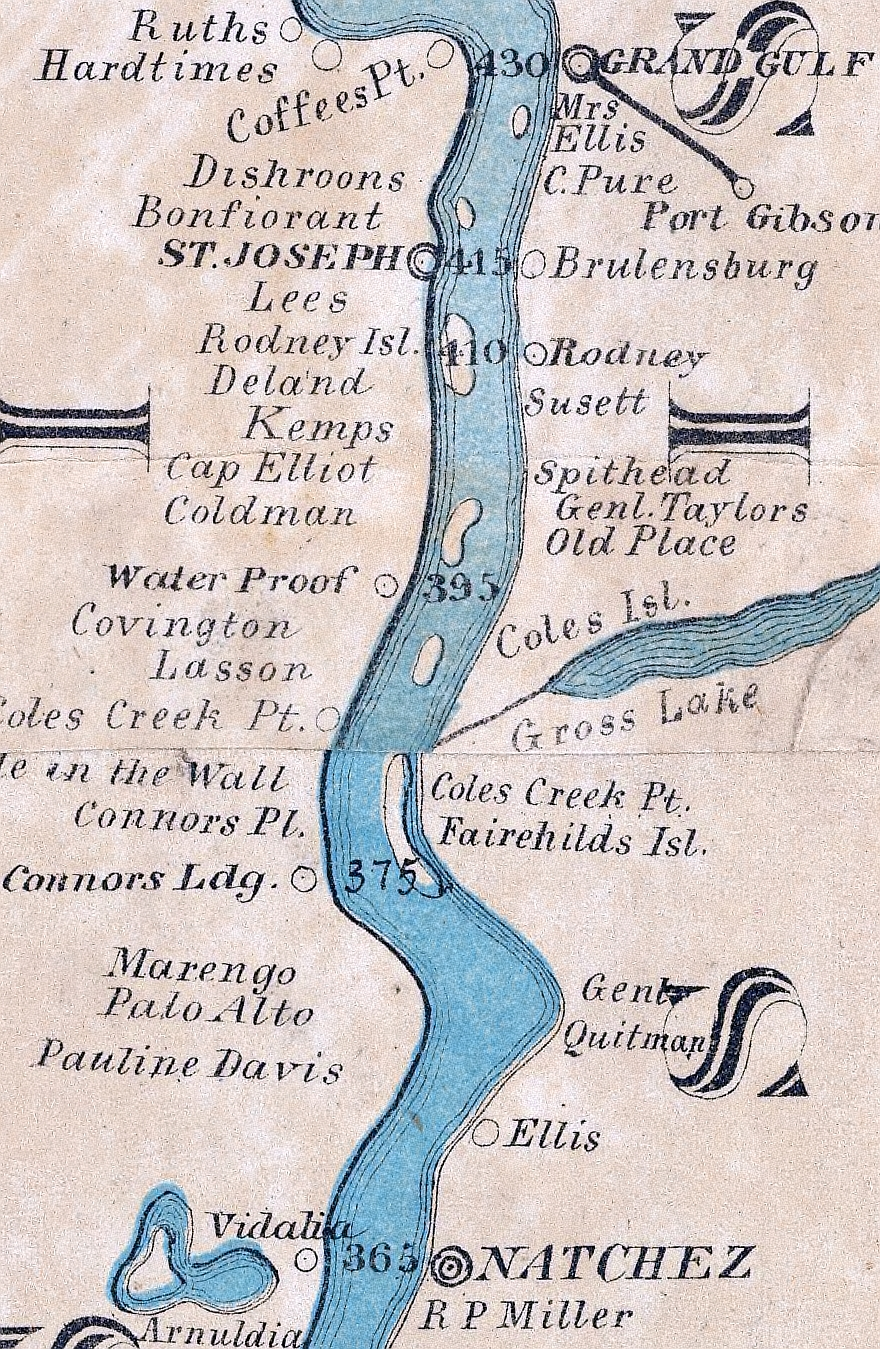
Map from 1866 showing "Genl. Taylors Old Place"

The Cypress Grove Plantation was a Southern plantation owned by President Zachary Taylor near Rodney, Mississippi. Later, it was also known as Buena Vista Plantation.

== Location ==
The plantation bordered Ashland Plantation and the Mississippi River. It was near the Ashland community, and Ashland's port was sometimes used by Cypress Grove Plantation. The plantation was also located on the Mississippi River ten miles below Rodney, a small town on the Mississippi River in Jefferson County, Mississippi. It was north of Natchez.

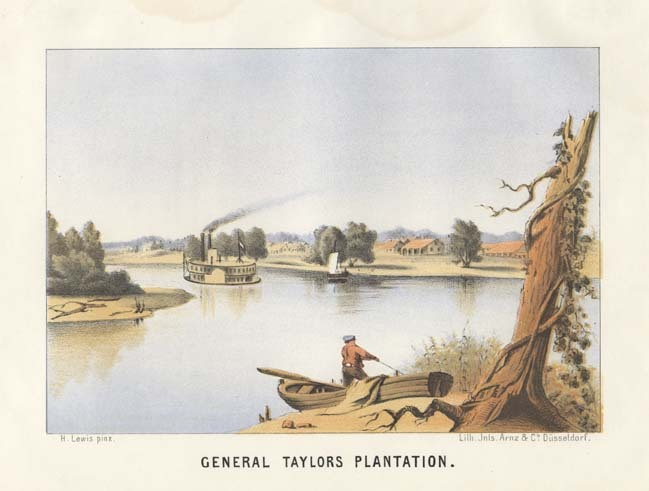
General Taylors Plantation by Henry Lewis (circa 1854–57). December 3, 2024· This painting of three plantations was painted form a Tensas Parish, Louisiana vantage point on the Mississippi River of General Zachary Taylor's Plantation "Buna Vista" right; Spithead or James Surget's Plantation center; and Samuel Norris Robb's Plantation "Pecan Grove" left. All three were washed into the river when it changed course after the 1927 flood. The land on the left is Rodney Island, and the main river channel center with the paddle boat was later known as Gillian's Chute when the main channel moved to the west side of Rodney Island. information from Sam Lenaeus

== History ==
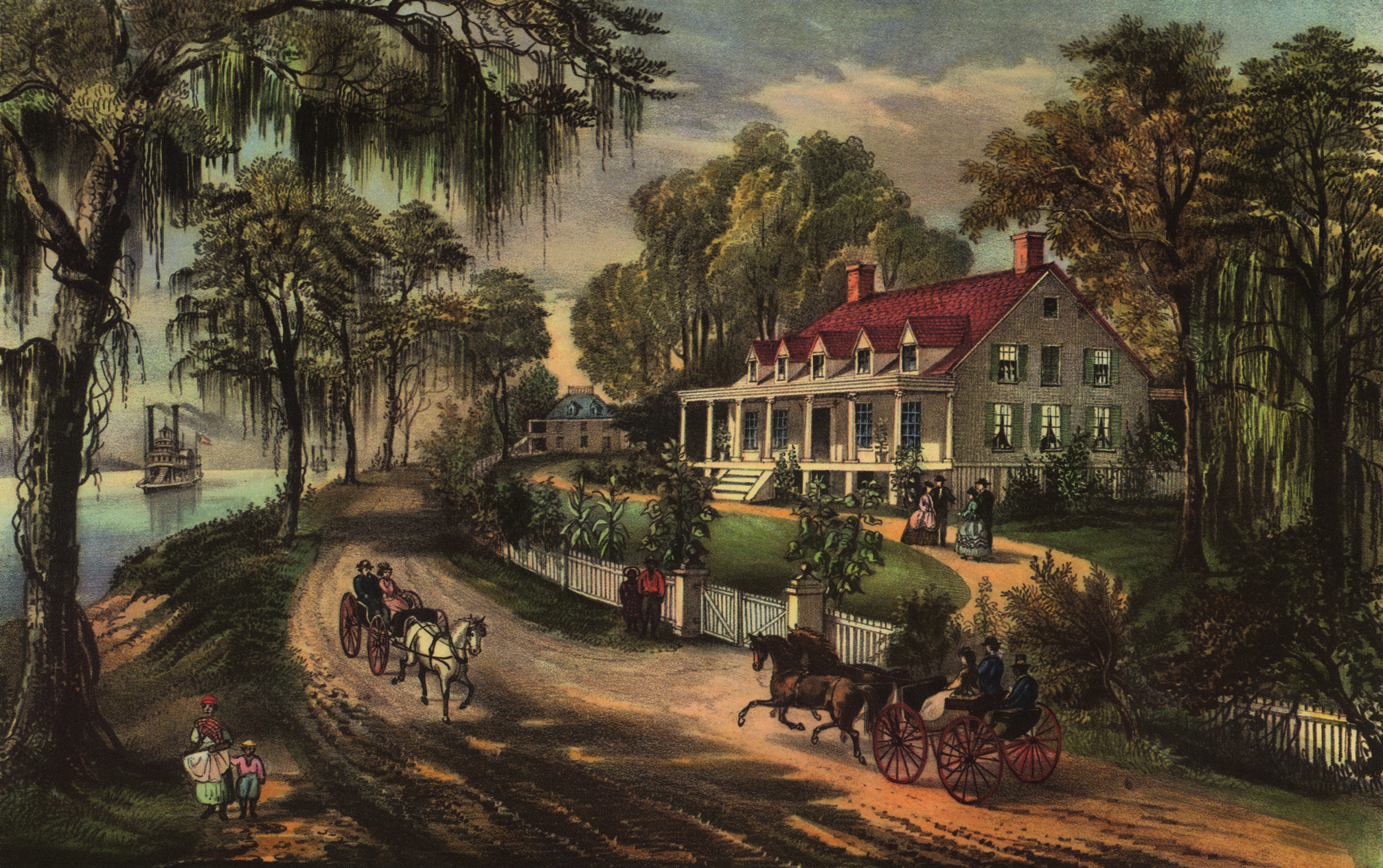
An idyllic depiction of a home on the Mississippi River by Currier and Ives

The plantation was purchased by General Zachary Taylor in 1840. The land spanned 1,923 acres. Previously, it was purchased from David Hunt and others by John Hagan of New Orleans, and then sold to Taylor for $95,000. The property came with eighty-one enslaved African or African-Americans - "servants," as Taylor called them, and with horses, mules, cattle and equipment. Taylor and his wife, Margaret Taylor, often visited the plantation until he was elected President of the United States in 1848. Indeed, she spent most of her time at the plantation while he was serving in the Mexican–American War. Though Taylor won many battles in the war, the Battle of Buena Vista was his last victory in 1847. The plantation became known as Buena Vista when Taylor returned from the war.

Taylor's parents, Colonel Richard and Sara Strother Taylor, raised him on their plantation, so he had experience running a plantation. Cotton, tobacco, corn and wheat were grown, and hogs, sheep, cattle and poultry were raised on his plantation. He grew potatoes and peas in his garden. His home on the plantation was made of timber and included a large library. He also had a sawmill on this plantation.

Taylor first hired a cousin of his wife, Damascus Thornton, as the first overseer. He later hired another cousin, James Thornton, until the latter resigned in 1845. The third overseer was Thomas W. Ringgold. Taylor corresponded with Ringgold from Corpus Christi, Texas and Mexico during the Mexican-American War. According to biographer K. Jack Bauer, his slaves were treated well, well-fed and even received Christmas presents each year. On top of picking cotton and other crops, they built levees on the Mississippi River and on an adjacent creek. Later, Taylor's son, General Richard Taylor, helped manage the plantation.

Mississippi River travelers could cut ten miles from their trip by going through Gillam's Shute which flowed between Buena Vista Island and Taylor's plantation. Thus, the plantation was well known to river travelers. Taylor died on July 9, 1850. Taylor's widow, Margaret, and the other heirs sold the plantation land in 1850 to Charles B. New for $20,000. Most of the land has since eroded away into the Mississippi River.
