= Ashland, Jefferson County, Mississippi =

Ashland, Mississippi
- Unincorporated community
- Location within Mississippi Location within the United States
- Coordinates: 31°48′01″N 91°20′53″W
- Country: United States
- State: Mississippi
- County: Jefferson
- Elevation: 72 ft (22 m)
- Time zone: UTC-6 (Central (CST))
  - Summer (DST): UTC-5 (CDT)
- GNIS feature ID: 691671

Ashland (also Ashland Landing) is a ghost town in Jefferson County, Mississippi, United States.

Ashland was located directly on the Mississippi River.

== Deception of President-elect Taylor ==
Ashland was located near Cypress Grove Plantation, purchased in 1840 by future United States president Zachary Taylor. After Taylor was elected president in 1849, the large and elegant steamer Tennessee was sent to pick him up at Ashland Landing and transport him to Vicksburg to attend several receptions. It went unnoticed in the pre-dawn hours that the steamer Saladin had arrived at Ashland Landing before the Tennessee. Tom Coleman, Saladin's 24-year-old captain, was a Taylor family friend who wanted the honor of transporting the president-elect to Vicksburg. When aides discovered the deception, they woke Taylor, who had been sleeping in Saladin's stateroom. Taylor laughed and stated that the Tennessee would catch up at Vicksburg and he could transfer there.
