= St. James' Episcopal Church (Manhattan) =

Church in Manhattan, New York

Coordinates: 40.77108°N 73.96572°W

St. James' Church
- The Parish Church of Saint James
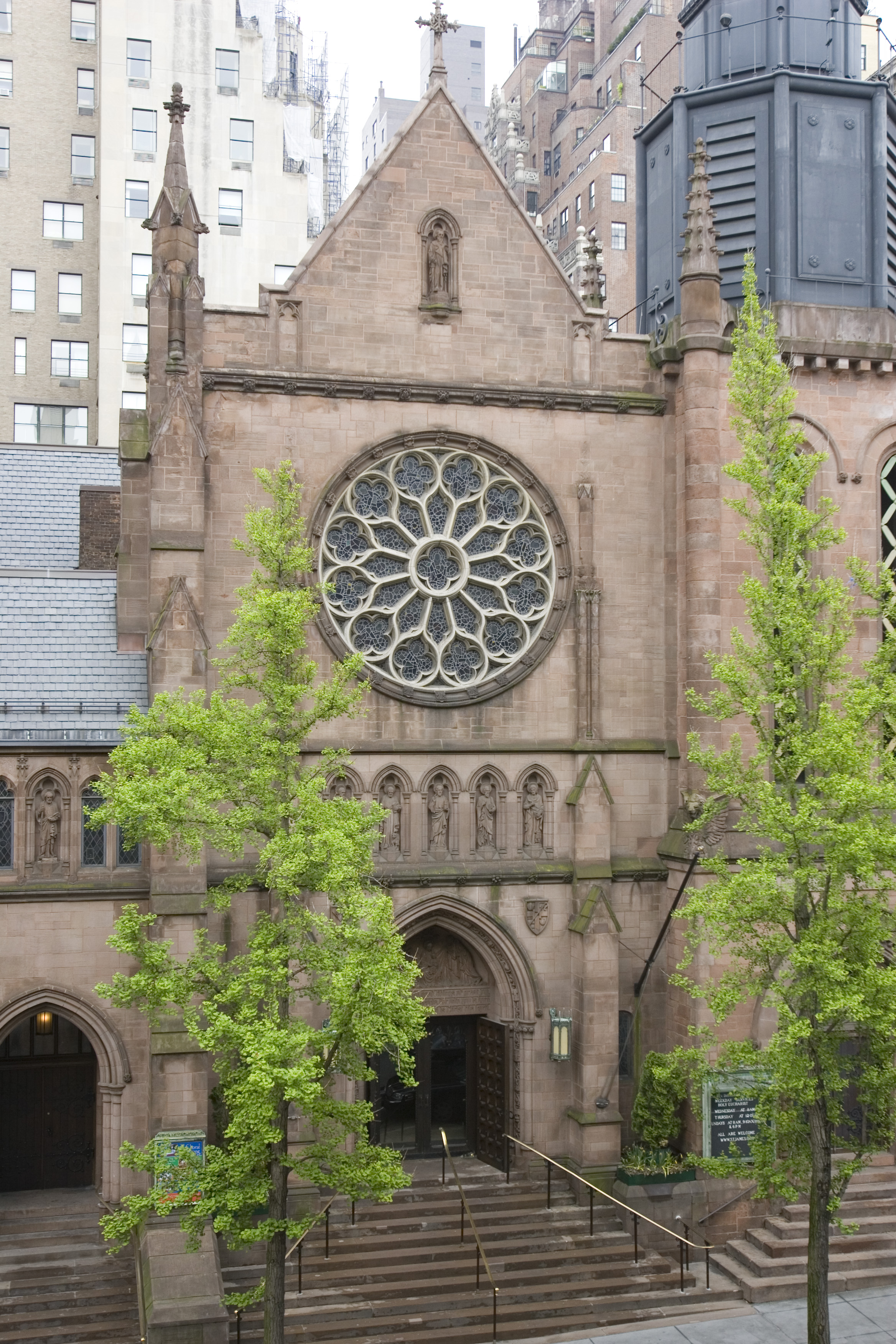
- St. James' Church
- Location: Madison Avenue and 71st Street; New York City, New York
- Country: U.S.
- Denomination: Episcopal Church
- Website: www.stjames.org

History
- Founded: 1810

Administration
- Diocese: Episcopal Diocese of New York

Clergy
- Rector: The Rev. Zachary Thompson

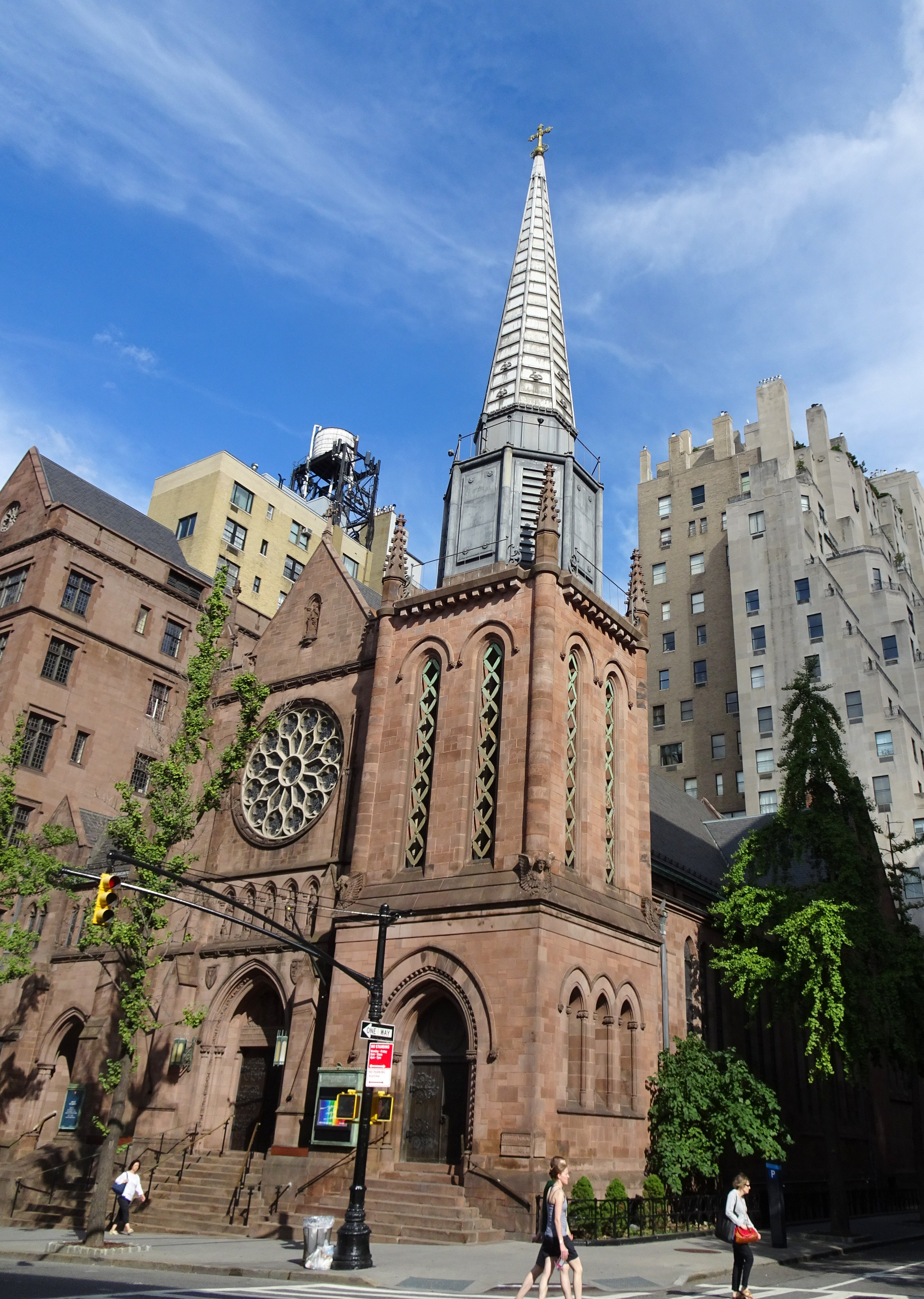

St. James' Church is an Episcopal parish church located at the intersection of Madison Avenue and 71st Street on the Upper East Side of Manhattan, New York City.

Sponsored by Trinity Church and completed in May 1810 as a summer chapel for New Yorkers with country homes north of the then city, it has grown into one of the largest Episcopal churches in New York City. In addition to worship, it has programs for children and young families, youth and young adults, as well as a music program and a devotion to mission and service in the community.

The church reported 1,508 members in 2015 and 1,655 members in 2023. Plate and pledge income reported for the congregation in 2024 was $2,973,713 with average Sunday attendance (ASA) of 373 persons. This was a relative decrease on reported ASA of 776 in 2020.

== Worship & music ==
St. James' Church worships in a variety of styles within the Anglican tradition. Four services of Holy Eucharist are celebrated every Sunday.

=== Music ===
In 2008–2009, the parish installed the St. James' Bicentennial Organ, built by Schoenstein & Co. Organbuilders (op. 156 & 157) in San Francisco. The organ contains a total of 5,538 pipes, with 4,407 pipes in the chancel organ and 1,131 pipes in the gallery. The new organ was dedicated in October 2010.

== Recent history ==
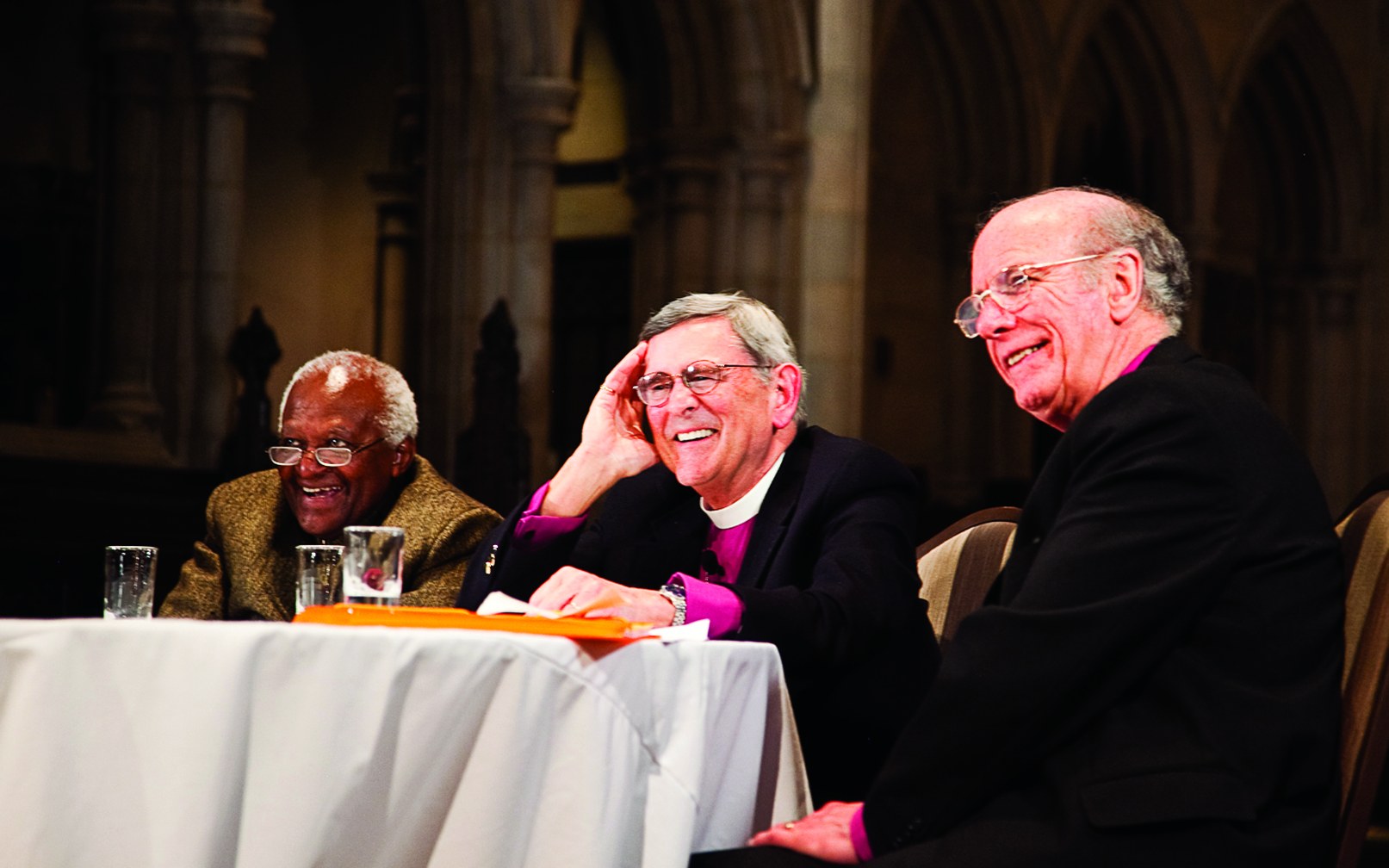

In 1996 St. James' called as rector the Rev. Brenda G. Husson, the first woman chosen to lead a parish of such size and prominence in the diocese. Under Husson's leadership, St. James' received a large private grant to establish the Partners in Mission program. The PIM grant currently supports ongoing partnerships with the Anglican Diocese of Southern Malawi in Africa, three Episcopal parishes in Haiti, as well as regular work with the Osborne Association's outreach to children with incarcerated parents in New York.

Husson retired in 2023, after 27 years as rector.

St. James' was invited to participate in the Lilly Endowment's nationwide Transition into Ministry program for the mentoring of new clergy. The position of 'Lilly Fellow' was created in 2003 to train new priests in all aspects of parish life.

St. James' celebrated its bicentennial year in 2010. The parish welcomed Katharine Jefferts Schori, Presiding Bishop of the Episcopal Church, for a festive service marking the culmination of the bicentennial year on November 14, 2010.

=== Rectors ===
- Samuel Farmer Jarvis (1811–1819)
- William Richmond (1820–1837)
- James Cook Richmond (1837–1842)
- John Dowdney (1842–1847)
- Edwin Harwood (1847–1850)
- Peter Schermerhorn Chauncey (1851–1866)
- Cornelius Bishop Smith (1867–1895)
- E. Walpole Warren (1895–1903)
- Frederick Courtney (1904–1915)
- Frank Warfield Crowder (1916–1932)
- Horace William Baden Donegan (1933–1947)
- Arthur Lee Kinsolving (1947–1969)
- John Bowen Coburn (1969–1975)
- Hays Hamilton Rockwell (1976–1990)
- Mark S. Anschutz (1992–1995)
- Brenda G. Husson (1996–2023)
- Zachary Thompson (2023–present)

== In popular culture ==
- The 5:00PM St. James' Christmas Eve service of Lessons and Carols was broadcast over the local WOR and WQXR radio stations in New York City as early as 1934, and then annually from the early 1950s through 2000.
- St. James' Church was the site of funerals for John Steinbeck, Edward R. Murrow, and Montgomery Clift.
- The exterior and interior of St. James' have been seen in Gossip Girl (CW television series).

== See also ==
- Anglican Communion
- Book of Common Prayer
- Christianity

== Gallery ==
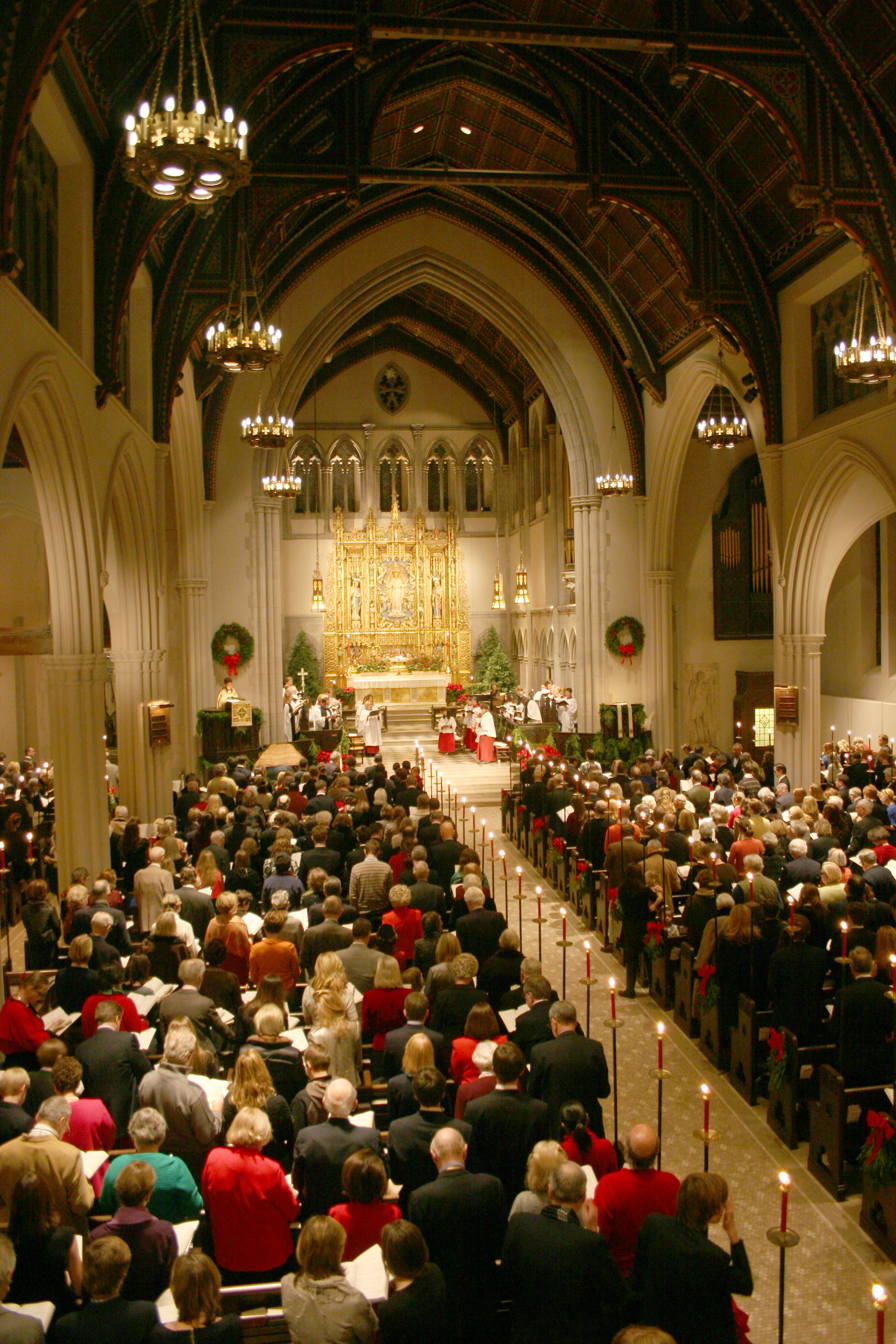

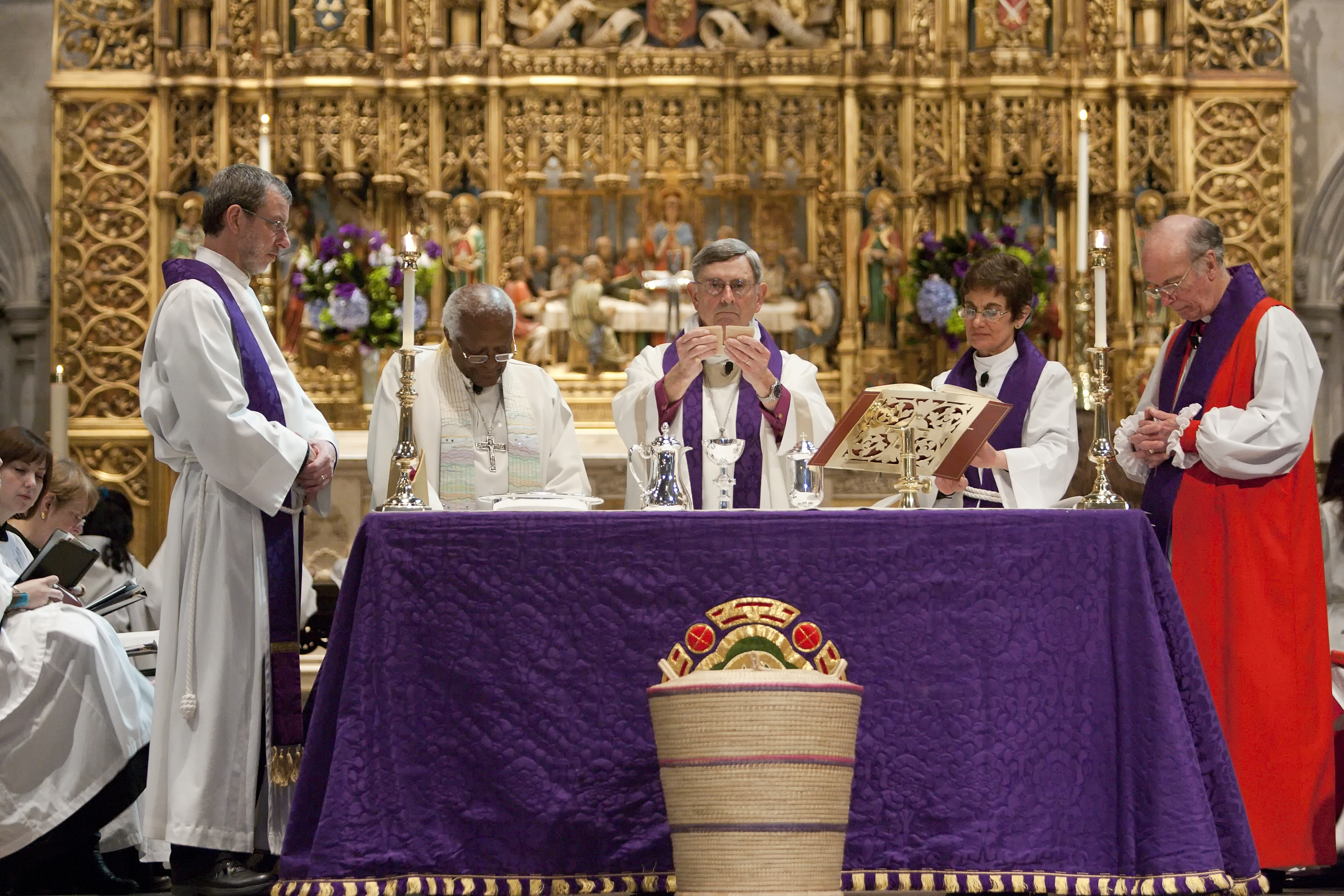

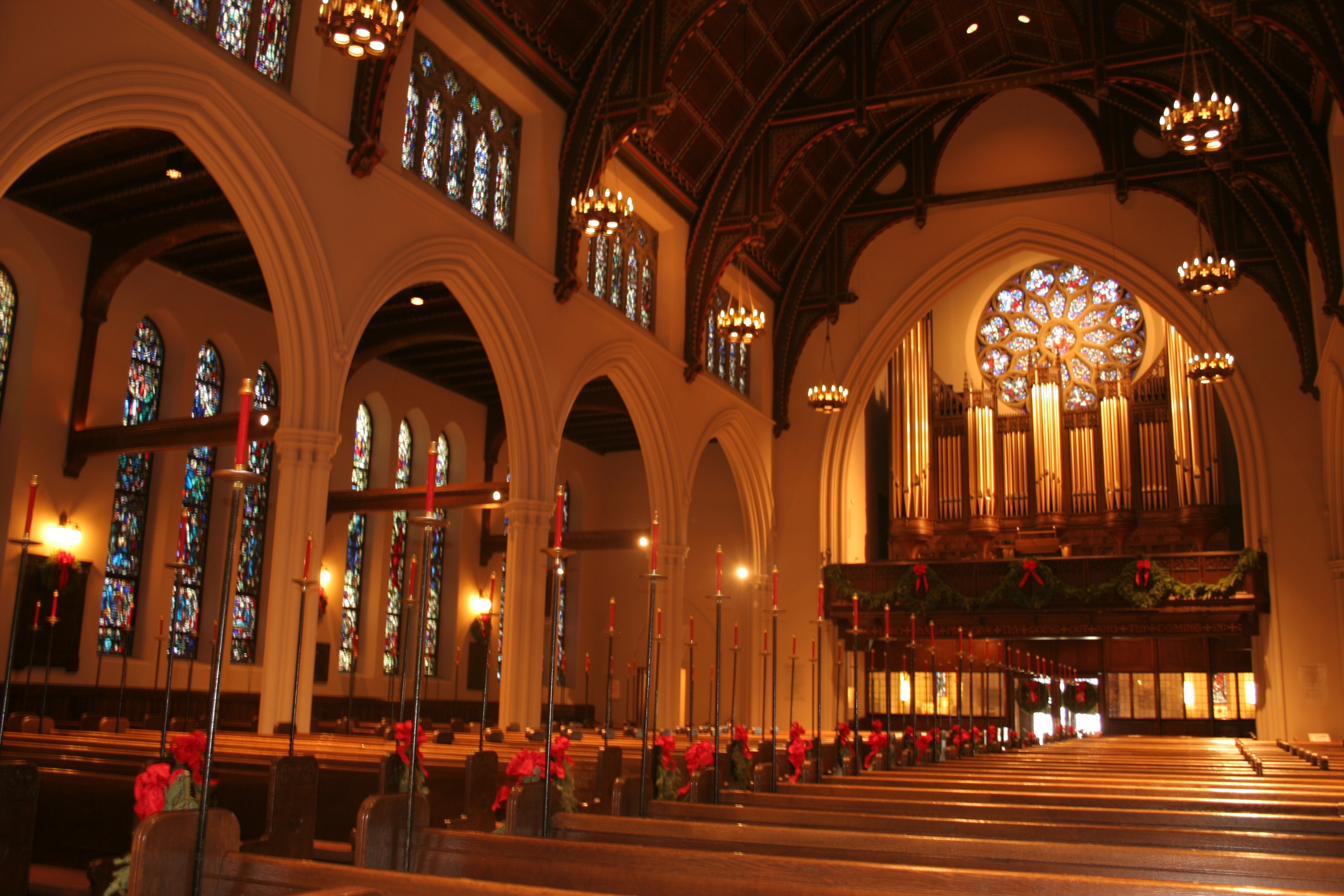

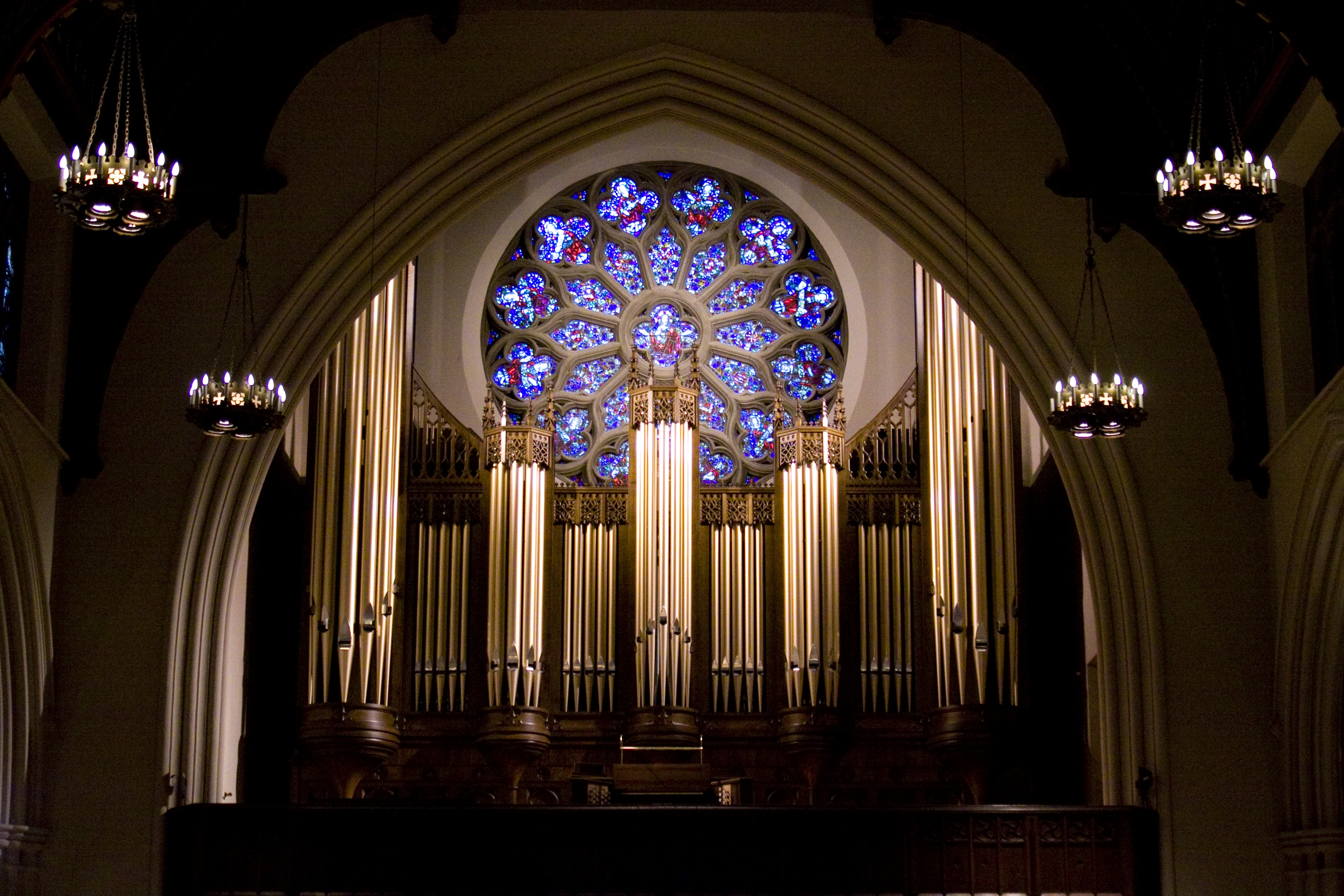

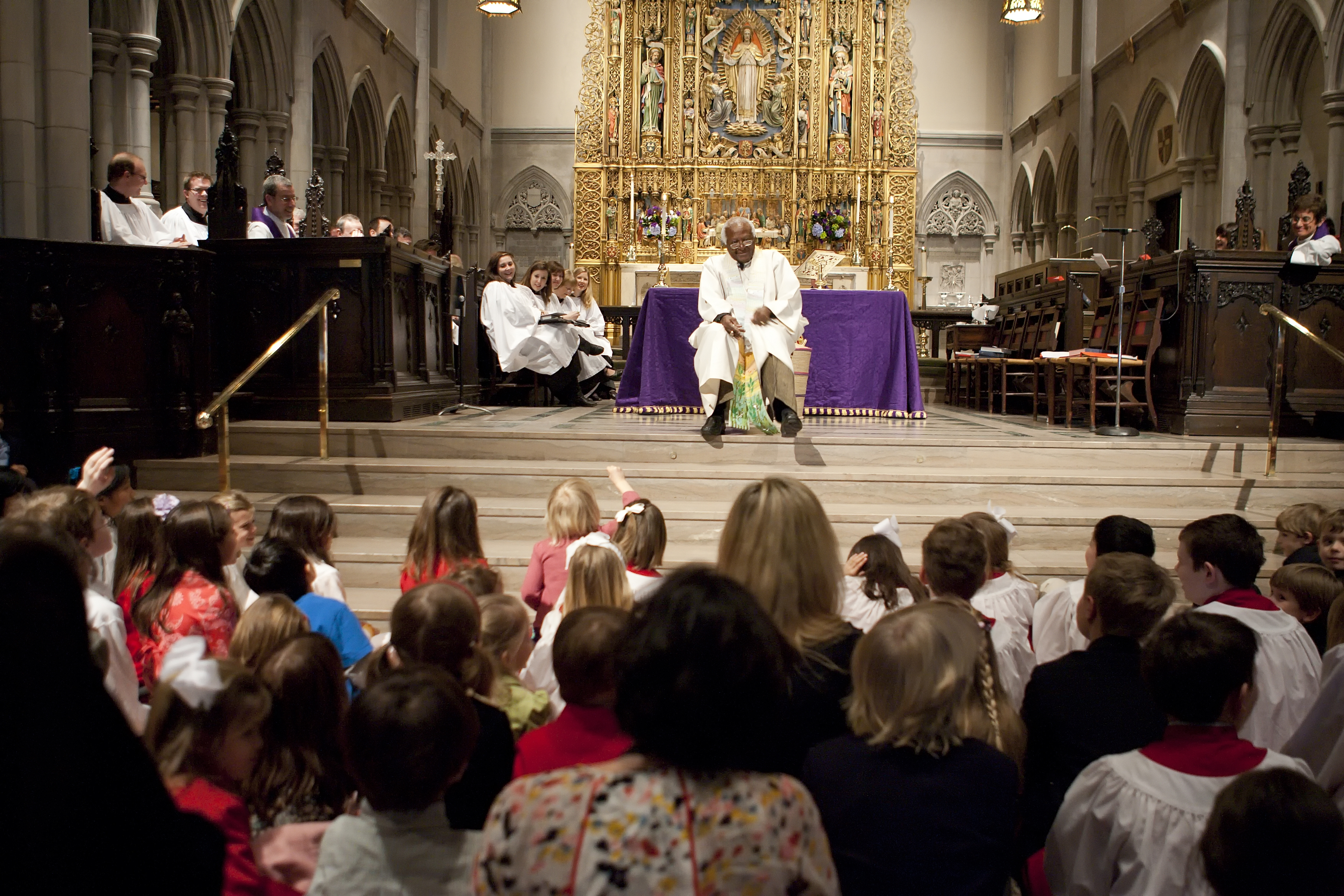
Desmond Tutu preaching a children's sermon, March 2010.
