= Charles Carroll Wood =

Canadian military officer (1876–1899)

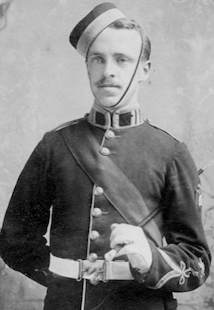
- Wood as a cadet at RMC
- Born: 19 March 1876; Halifax, Nova Scotia, Canada
- Died: 11 November 1899 (aged 23); Belmont, South Africa
- Military career
- Allegiance: United Kingdom
- Branch: British Army
- Service years: 1892–1899
- Rank: Lieutenant
- Units: Royal Military College of Canada; 1st North Lancashire Regiment
- Conflicts: Second Boer War

Lieutenant Charles Carroll Wood (19 March 1876 – 11 November 1899) was the first Canadian Officer to die in the Second Boer War. As a member of a family that had distinguished itself in America, his great grandfather being Zachary Taylor, 12th President of the United States, he was buried with full military honours.

Also known as Lieut. C. C. Wood, on the news of his death, Queen Victoria wrote a letter of condolence to his family and, at the Queen's request, Lieut. Wood's portrait was sent to her at Windsor. Robert E. Lee Jr. was among others to send his condolences to Wood's family having met Wood in Halifax, Nova Scotia, three years earlier.

Lieut. Wood's memorial service at St. Luke's Cathedral in Halifax, Nova Scotia, was attended by Lord Seymour, then Commander of the British Troops in Canada, the British Services and the Canadian Militia, in uniform. Lieut. Wood's memorial service was officiated by Bishop Courtney.

In addition to being the descendant of a President, he was the son of John Taylor Wood and a grand-nephew of Jefferson Davis who served as President of the Confederate States of America from 1861 to 1865. His brother was Zachary Taylor Wood. On his maternal side, Wood was a descendant of Charles Carroll of Carrollton, a signatory of the United States Declaration of Independence. An obituary stated that the 'lamented death of this promising young officer, when fighting in defence of the Mother Country, will be deeply felt by all, and will be an enduring example of the Colonial sons of the Empire'.

After his death, Chaswood, Nova Scotia, was named in his honour to 'perpetuate the memory of Charles Wood, a native of Halifax and the first Canadian soldier to be killed in action in the South African War'.

Lieut. Wood's name was the first on the roll of honour to be carved on a statue designed by Hamilton MacCarthy in Halifax, Nova Scotia, commemorating Canadians who died in the Boer War. The cornerstone of the monument was laid in October 1901 by the Duke of Duchess of York and Cornwall, the Duke later reigning as King George V. Wood also has a commemorative plaque on the memorial staircase at the RMC Club in Kingston, Ontario, and his memory is recorded on a statue in Toronto.

== Life ==
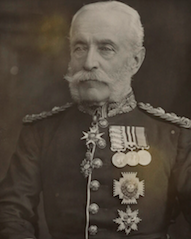
General Lord William Seymour, who represented the British Army at the memorial service of Lieut. Wood, St. Luke's Cathedral, Halifax, Nova Scotia, Canada

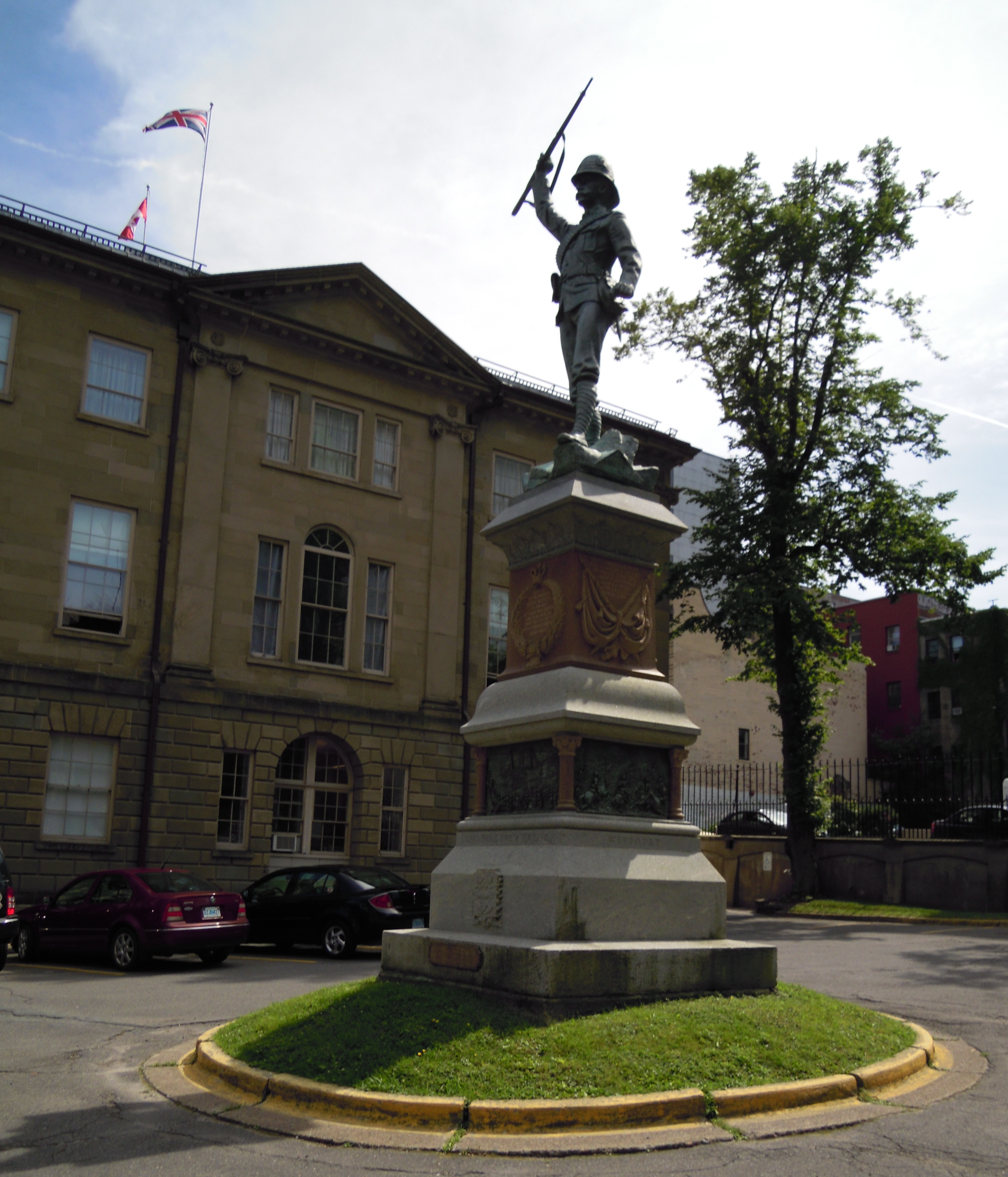
South African Soldier's Monument at Halifax, Nova Scotia, Canada

Charles Carroll Wood was born in Halifax, Nova Scotia where his father, John Taylor Wood, had resided since the end of the American Civil War having served as a Confederate Officer. Charles Carroll Wood was a grandnephew of Jefferson Davis and a great-grandson of Zachary Taylor, 12th President of the United States. His great-great-grandfather was Colonel Richard Taylor, an Officer in the Continental Army of the American Revolutionary War.

Wood's mother was Lola Mackubin Wood and his brother was Zachary Taylor Wood. Wood's mother hailed from the Carrolls of Carrollton. Charles Carroll of Carrollton was a signatory of the United States Declaration of Independence.

Charles Carroll Wood was educated in England at Bedford Modern School between 1886 and 1889, and later entered the Royal Military College of Canada in Kingston, Ontario, graduating in 1896. When his father left the United States for Canada after the American Civil War, Wood remained a British Subject of Canadian birth and was commissioned into the 1st Loyal North Lancashire Regiment. He served in India before being sent to South Africa at the outset of the Second Boer War and was made Lieutenant in 1899.

On 11 November 1899, Charles Carroll Wood was killed at Belmont, near Orange River, having 'been wounded in the head and chest with his face to the foe'. Wood's Colonel, Cecil Edward Keith-Falconer of the Northumberland Fusiliers, was killed at the same time. Corporal Lincoln, who had been involved in the skirmish at Belmont, stated in his diary that it 'had been a splendid victory for the British arms completely defeating the Boers on their own chosen position which was one of great natural strength'.

Lieut. Wood was the first Canadian born Officer to die in the Second Boer War. Wood and his Colonel were buried in the same veldt with full military honours. Shortly after Lieut. Wood's death, a memorial service was held in his honour at St. Luke's Cathedral in Halifax, Nova Scotia. The service was attended by Lord Seymour, then Commander of the British troops in Canada, the British Services and the Canadian Militia, in uniform. The memorial service was officiated by Bishop Courtney. In its description of the eulogy, an article in The Boston Globe stated that the 'edifice was crowded. The lectern and pulpit was draped with the British flag'.

On the news of his death, Queen Victoria wrote a letter of condolence to his family and, at her request, Lieut. Wood's portrait was sent to her at Windsor. Robert E. Lee Jr. was among others to send his condolences to Wood's family having met Wood in Halifax, Nova Scotia, three years earlier.

Chaswood, Nova Scotia was named in Lieut. Wood's honour to 'perpetuate the memory of Charles Wood, a native of Halifax and the first Canadian soldier to be killed in action in the South African War'. Lieut. Wood's name is carved on a statue in Halifax, Nova Scotia, designed by Hamilton MacCarthy and commemorating Canadians who died in the Second Boer War. Wood also has a commemorative plaque on the memorial staircase at the RMC Club in Kingston, Ontario. In a public expression of sympathy, the children of Morris Street School honoured Charles Wood by planting a tree in the public garden of Halifax, Nova Scotia, with a commemorative plaque.

An obituary of Lieut. Wood stated that the 'lamented death of this promising young officer, when fighting in defence of the Mother Country, will be deeply felt by all, and will be an enduring example of the Colonial sons of the Empire'. He was remembered forty and fifty years after his death in Canadian newspapers.
