= Robert Crooke Wood =

American Union Army surgeon

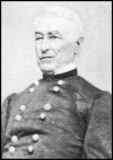
- Born: September 23, 1799; Newport, Rhode Island, US
- Died: March 28, 1869 (aged 69); New York City, New York, US
- Burial place: Cold Springs Cemetery, Lockport, New York, US
- Alma mater: Columbia University (M.D.)
- Spouse: Ann Mackall Taylor (m. 1829–1869)
- Military career
- Allegiance: United States (Union)
- Branch: United States Army (Union Army)
- Service years: 1825–1869
- Rank: Colonel; Bvt. Brigadier General
- Unit: 1st Infantry Regiment
- Conflicts: Black Hawk War: Battle of Bad Axe; Second Seminole War: Battle of Lake Okeechobee; Mexican–American War: Texas Campaign; Battle of Palo Alto; Battle of Resaca de la Palma; American Civil War

Robert Crooke Wood (September 23, 1799 – March 28, 1869) was an American Brevet Brigadier General, military physician and neurologist who was the Assistant Surgeon General throughout the American Civil War as well as serving in the Second Seminole War and the Mexican–American War. He was also the father of John Taylor Wood who would go on to serve in the Confederate States Navy as a captain.

== Early years ==
Robert was born on September 23, 1799, as the son of John Wood and Rebecca Wickham Wood. His childhood consisted of attending private schools and learning from private tutors. After taking an interest in medicine, Wood went to South Carolina to begin a study under Dr. Waring and afterwards, went to attend the Columbia University College of Physicians and Surgeons and graduated with a Doctor of Medicine in 1821.

He then moved to Utica, New York to practice medicine there until May 28, 1825, where he joined the United States Army as an assistant surgeon and was then stationed at the Detroit Barracks but was then transferred to Fort Snelling until May 1833 with the 1st Infantry Regiment. Around this time, he got married with Ann Mackall Taylor in 1829 who was the eldest daughter of Zachary Taylor. They proceeded to have one child there on August 13, 1830: John Taylor Wood.

=== Military career ===
Wood then participated at the Black Hawk War and was an active combatant at the Battle of Bad Axe which marked the end of the war. He was then transferred to Fort Crawford and was promoted to Major and Surgeon on July 4, 1836. He was then transferred to Florida due to the outbreak of the Second Seminole War at Fort Brooks but managed to participate at the Battle of Lake Okeechobee and would continue skirmishing with the Seminole natives until May 1839 when a truce was signed. When the truce was broken, Wood was transferred to Buffalo Barracks and served with the 5th Infantry Regiment until August 1845 as Wood was sent near the border with Mexico. Wood arrived at Corpus Christi, Texas in October and after spending the winter there, he was sent to a camp that overlooked Matamoros, Tamaulipas. Wood then participated at the battles of Palo Alto and Resaca de la Palma.

Due to the increasing amount of casualties in the Mexican–American War, a general hospital was required and after some clearing and construction, a hospital near Point Isabel was established and Wood was put in charge there as the hospital would grow to have over hundreds of different patients who were either wounded or severely ill. After the Siege of Veracruz however, the hospital no longer had enough capacity for the amount of patients and a makeshift hospital was constructed at Greenwood, Mississippi as a new one was being constructed at New Orleans. In May 1848, Wood was transferred to Fort McHenry where he served for the next six years. Due to his brother-in-law Jefferson Davis being elected United States Secretary of War, Wood was then assigned to become the Acting Surgeon General of Thomas Lawson's administration. With Lawson's death in 1861 however, there was an opening for Lawson's successor and Wood was a strong candidate due to his extensive experience within the medical field however due to the rise of the Republican Party, President Abraham Lincoln chose to put Clement Finley in the office instead. Finley kept Wood as his assistant as the American Civil War broke out. On April 14, 1862, however, Finley retired due to his displeasure with Edwin Stanton as well as the Sanitary Commission. Wood was again, a candidate for the position of Surgeon General but the Sanitary Commission had nominated Richard Sherwood Satterlee for the position but ultimately, William A. Hammond was appointed instead. Wood then requested to be Hammond's assistant and while he initially declined, accepted Wood's request on April 25, 1862, and Wood was transferred to St. Louis as he oversaw all medical affairs in the Department of the West. In October 1863, Wood was transferred to Louisville, Kentucky where he remained for the remainder of the war. He was brevetted lieutenant colonel, colonel and brigadier general on March 13, 1865, for "gallant and meritorious service during the war". Following the end of the war, Wood was stationed at Fort Adams until September 1867 when he was ordered to New York City for board duty as he was put on the list of retired officers where he retired in February 1869 before dying a month later from an outbreak of pneumonia.

== See also ==
- List of American Civil War brevet generals (Union)
