= Zachary Taylor Wood =

- Born: 1860; Annapolis Naval Academy
- Died: 1915 (aged 54–55); Asheville, North Carolina
- Burial place: Cataraqui Cemetery, Kingston, Ontario
- Military career
- Allegiance: Canadian
- Branch: Canadian Militia; North West Mounted Police
- Rank: Lieutenant (Canadian Militia); Commissioner (NWMP)
- Units: 90th Winnipeg Battalion of Rifles; NWMP
- Commands: acting Commissioner of the North-West Mounted Police (NWMP) and Commissioner of the Yukon Territory of Canada.
- Conflicts: North-West Rebellion
- Awards: CMG

Zachary Taylor Wood CMG (November 27, 1860 – January 15, 1915) was Assistant Commissioner with the North-West Mounted Police (NWMP) and the commissioner of Yukon.

== Early life ==
Born in Annapolis Naval Academy in 1860, where his father John Taylor Wood was stationed as a lieutenant in the United States Navy and later served as captain in the Confederate States Navy. Wood's great-grandfather was President of the United States Zachary Taylor.

Wood's family moved first to Halifax after fleeing the United States via Cuba in 1865. His father became a merchant and Wood would later move to Ontario. Wood graduated from Royal Military College of Canada at Kingston, Ontario, in 1882.

== Career ==
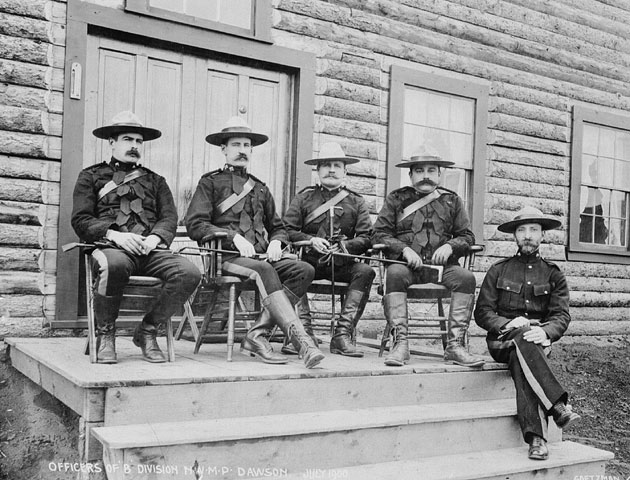
North-West Mounted Police (now RCMP) officers including Zachary Taylor Wood second from left, Yukon, 1900, wearing the famous scarlet uniform that includes a flat brimmed Stetson hat.

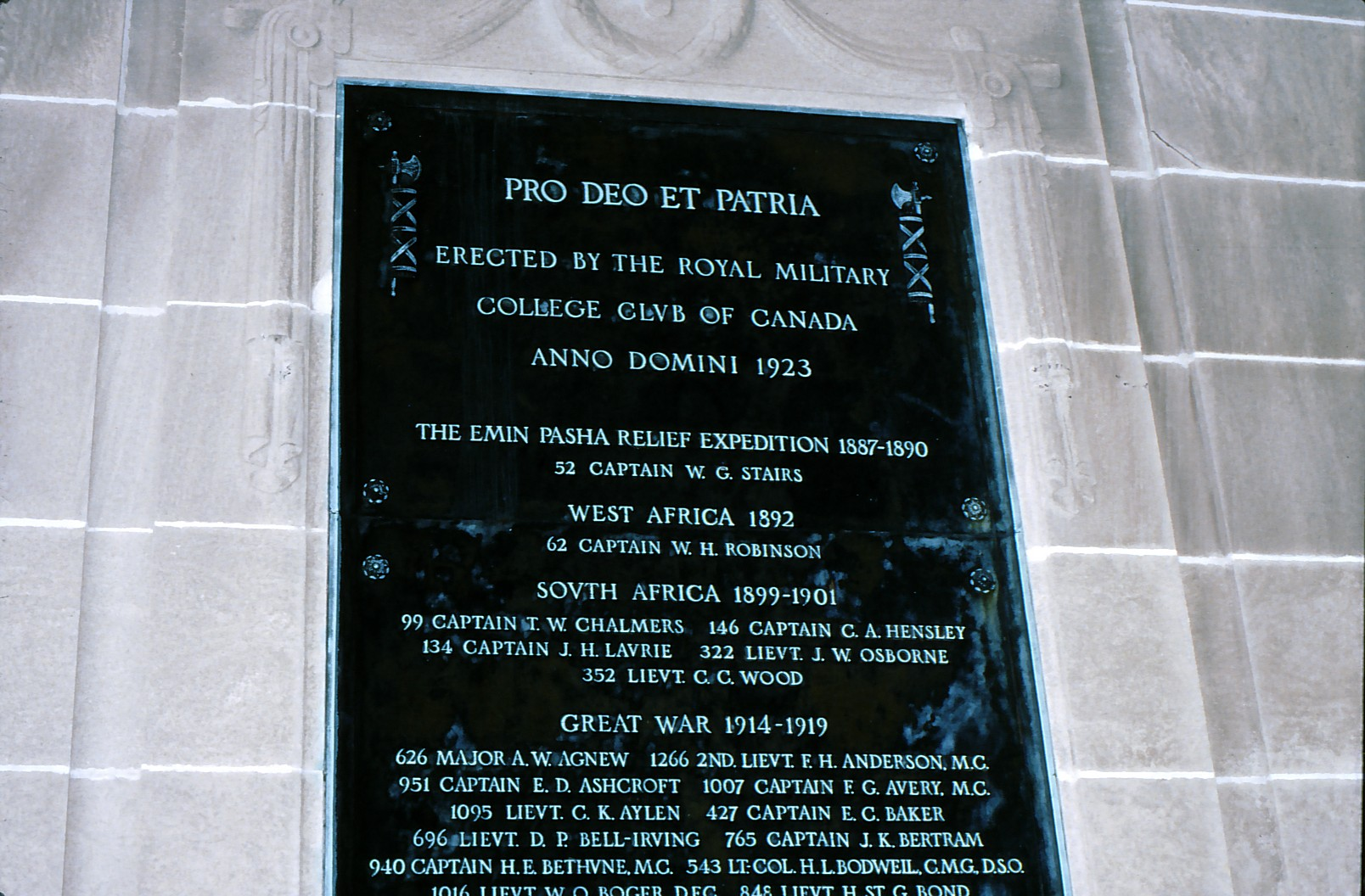
Royal Military College memorial

Zachary Taylor Wood served in the Canadian Militia as a Lieutenant with the 90th Winnipeg Battalion of Rifles at the Battle of Batoche during the North-West Rebellion in 1885. He joined the North-West Mounted Police in 1885 as an inspector under the command of Superintendent Sam Steele. He was promoted to the rank of Assistant Commissioner in 1892 and also served as Acting Commissioner. In 1897, he went to the Yukon and became a member of the territorial council in 1900. He was appointed Companion of the Order of St Michael and St George (CMG) in 1913. He retired from the force due to poor health and died in Asheville, North Carolina, in 1915 and buried at Cataraqui Cemetery in Kingston, Ontario.

== Family ==
His younger brother Lieutenant Charles Carroll Wood, graduated from the Royal Military College of Canada 1896 student # 352; served with the British Army's Loyal Regiment (North Lancashire) in the Boer War and died on November 11, 1899. He is memorialized on the Royal Military College Memorial Arch and buried at West End Cemetery in Kimberley, South Africa.

Inspector Zachary Taylor Wood married Frances Augusta Daly in 1888 at St. Mary Magdalene Church, in Napanee, Ontario.

Their son Stuart Taylor Wood was born in Napanee and later served as Commissioner of the Royal Canadian Mounted Police.

Stuart Taylor Wood was born in Napanee on October 17, 1889, son of Z.T. and Frances Wood. S.T. Wood was the Commissioner of the RCMP for thirteen years. He was a CMG (Companion of the Order of St. Michael and St. George).

== Legacy ==
Mount Wood in the Yukon was named in honour of Zachary Taylor Wood in 1998, in honour of the 125th anniversary of the RCMP. According to Place Names of Canada, Mt. Wood was named in 1900 by the surveyor James J. McArthur (1856–1925) to honour Zachary Taylor Wood.
