= John Newland Maffitt (privateer) =

Officer in the Confederate States Navy

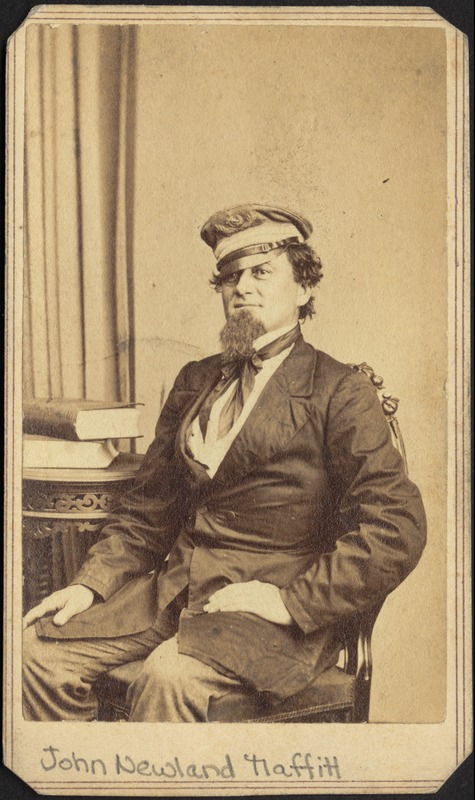
- Commander John Newland Maffitt, CSN in 1863
- Born: February 22, 1819; Atlantic Ocean
- Died: May 15, 1886 (aged 67); Wilmington, North Carolina
- Military career
- Allegiance: United States of America; Confederate States of America
- Branch: United States Navy; Confederate States Navy
- Service years: USN 1832-1861; CSN 1861-1865
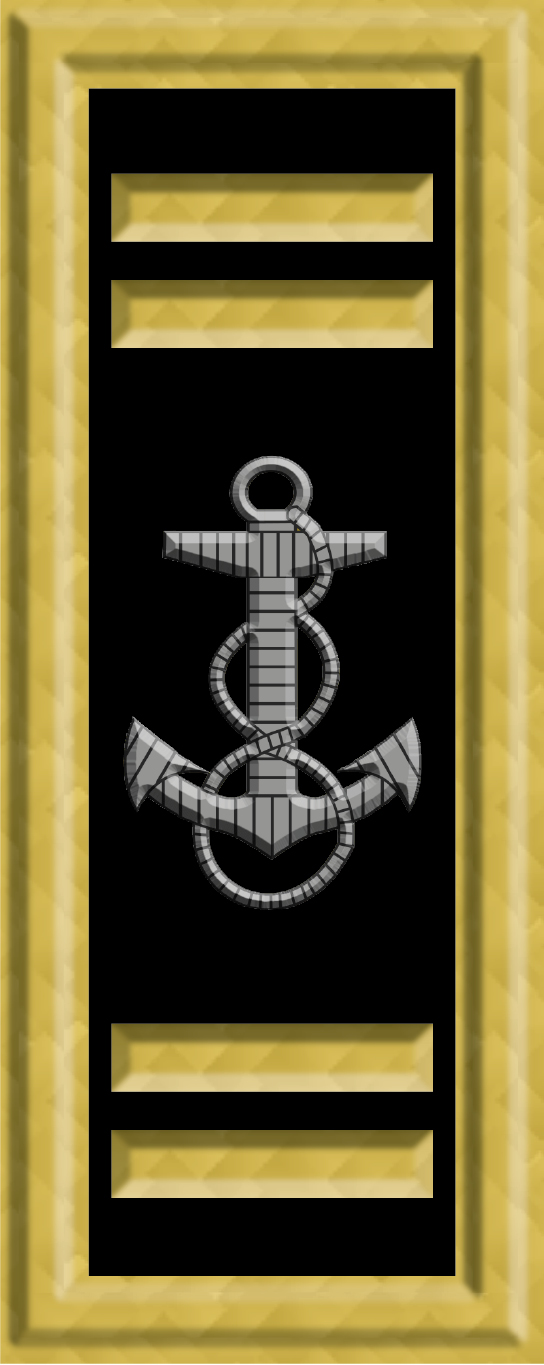
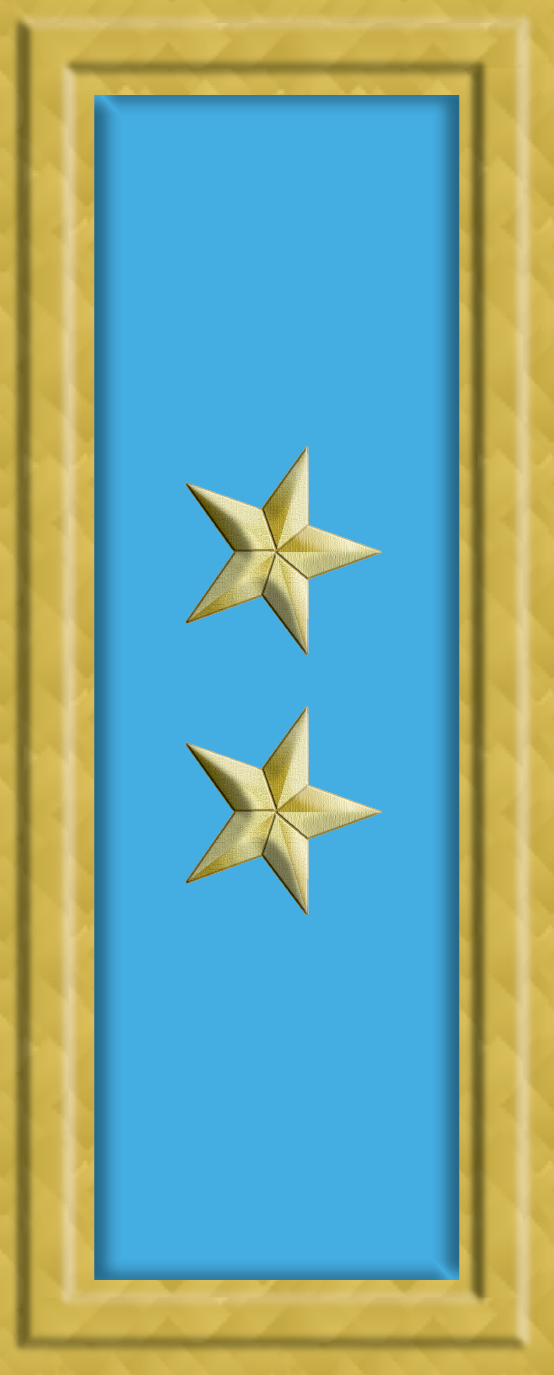
- Rank: Lieutenant (USN) Commander (CSN)
- Nickname: "Prince of Privateers"
- Conflicts: American Civil War

John Newland Maffitt (February 22, 1819 – May 15, 1886) was an officer in the Confederate States Navy who was nicknamed the "Prince of Privateers" due to his success as a blockade runner and commerce raider in the U.S. Civil War.

== Early life ==
Maffitt was born at sea on a ship bound for New York City, his parents having emigrated from Ireland. Maffitt's parents, Reverend John Newland Maffitt and his wife Ann Carnicke, settled with their son in Connecticut. When Maffitt was about five years old, he was adopted by his uncle, Dr. William Maffitt who traveled across the Atlantic Ocean with them, and moved to Fayetteville, North Carolina to live at the Ellerslie Plantation.

Maffitt was a slave owner, and sold Cornelia Williams Read in 1857. During the American Civil War, while commanding the Confederate States Navy cruiser CSS Florida, he was chased by the United States Navy steam frigate USS Niagara to Europe. On board Niagara was William B. Gould, who married Read after the war.

== United States Navy service ==
Maffitt entered the United States Navy as a midshipman in February 1832, at the age of thirteen. He first served aboard USS St. Louis in the West Indies, and was later assigned to the Pensacola Navy Yard. In 1835 he was assigned to USS Constitution, serving as an aide to Commodore Jesse Elliott in the Mediterranean; his service aboard Constitution would later become the basis for a novel, Nautilus; or, Cruising under Canvas, published in 1871. He also served on the frigate USS Macedonian, becoming its acting Master in 1841.

Maffitt was ordered to the United States Coast Survey in 1842, and was promoted to the rank of Lieutenant in 1843. He spent more than fourteen years in the hydrographic survey, chiefly in Nantucket, Massachusetts, Wilmington, North Carolina, Charleston, South Carolina, and Savannah, Georgia. A channel in Charleston Harbor still bears his name.

In 1857, Maffitt was placed in command of the brig USS Dolphin and ordered to capture pirates and slavers in the West Indies. On August 21, 1858, Dolphin captured the slaver Echo with 318 Africans on board and sent her into Charleston; the liberated slaves were later sent back to Africa. Maffitt became commander of USS Crusader in 1859 and continued his assignment to suppress slavers in the West Indies until February 7, 1861.

== Confederate States Navy service ==
John Newland Maffitt

In May 1861, with the coming of the U.S. Civil War, Maffitt resigned his U.S. Navy commission and became a First Lieutenant in the Confederate States Navy. He served as a naval aide to General Robert E. Lee while preparations for the defense of Savannah were in progress. In early 1862, Maffitt was ordered to the civilian steamer Cecile to run the blockade with supplies for the Confederacy.

On August 17, 1862, he became the first commanding officer of the cruiser CSS Florida, taking her through a difficult outfitting period during which most of the ship's company was stricken with yellow fever. While in port in Cuba, Commander Maffitt himself contracted the disease. In this condition, Maffitt sailed Florida from Cárdenas, Cuba to Mobile, Alabama. With the way into Mobile Bay blocked by Union warships, Florida braved a hail of projectiles from the blockaders and raced through them to anchor beneath the guns of Fort Morgan. The bombardment from the blockaders was severe and the damage to Florida was so great that Maffitt did not return to sea for more than three months. To prevent his escape, the Union Navy increased the blockading force near Mobile.

Having taken stores and gun accessories the ship lacked, along with added crew members, Maffitt waited for a violent storm before setting out on January 16, 1863. He used trickery to lose six pursuing blockaders. After coaling at Nassau, Bahamas, Florida spent 6 months off North and South America and in the West Indies, with calls at neutral ports, all the while making captures and eluding the large Federal squadron pursuing her. It was during this period that he acquired the nickname "Prince of Privateers" (which was somewhat inaccurate, since he was a naval officer and not an actual privateer.)

Maffitt was promoted to the rank of Commander in May 1863 "for gallant and meritorious conduct in command of the steam sloop Florida." Ill health due to the lingering effects of yellow fever forced him to relinquish command of Florida at Brest, France on February 12, 1864.

In the summer of 1864, after returning to the Confederate States, Maffit was given command of the ironclad ram CSS Albemarle. Under Maffit's command, Albemarle dominated the Roanoke River and the approaches to Plymouth, North Carolina throughout the summer. In September, he was given command of the blockade runner CSS Owl. On October 3, Owl escaped to sea from Wilmington; the blockaders wounded her captain and several crewmen but 9 shots failed to stop them, and Owl arrived in Bermuda on October 24 with a large and valuable cargo of cotton. Maffit made several more successful runs through the Union blockade in Owl before the war ended.

During his service to the Confederacy, Maffitt repeatedly ran the blockade to carry needed supplies and captured and destroyed more than seventy prizes worth $10 to $15 million. Maffitt recognized the importance of a strong navy, for as he said, "The grand mistake of the South was neglecting her navy".

== Later life ==
At the end of the war, he refused to surrender his ship to the United States. Instead, he returned Owl to agents in Liverpool. He chose to remain in England, and, after passing the British naval examination, he served for about two years in command of the British merchant steamer Widgeon running between Liverpool and South America. He returned to the United States in 1868 and settled on a farm near Wilmington, North Carolina. In 1870, Maffit commanded a warship for Cuban revolutionaries during the Ten Years' War.

Maffit died in Wilmington in 1886, leaving an unfinished manuscript about piracy in the West Indies. His collected papers are in the library of the University of North Carolina at Chapel Hill.

== See also ==
- Blockade runners of the American Civil War
- Confederate privateer

== Sources ==
- Commander John Newland Maffitt, CSN at U.S. Naval Historical Center
- Inventory of the John Newland Maffitt Papers at the University of North Carolina at Chapel Hill
- Biography of John Newland Maffitt at Confederate States Navy Museum, Library & Research Institute
- John Newland Maffitt and the Galveston Blockade at Texas A&M University Institute of Nautical Archaeology
- John Newland Maffitt at the Alexandria, Virginia Library
- "Captain John Newland Maffit", from Derelicts by James Sprunt, at Joyner Library, East Carolina University

== Bibliography ==
- Shingleton, Royce, High Seas Confederate: The Life and Times of John Newland Maffitt, ISBN 0-87249-986-3
