= John Taylor Wood =

Confederate Navy officer (1830–1904)

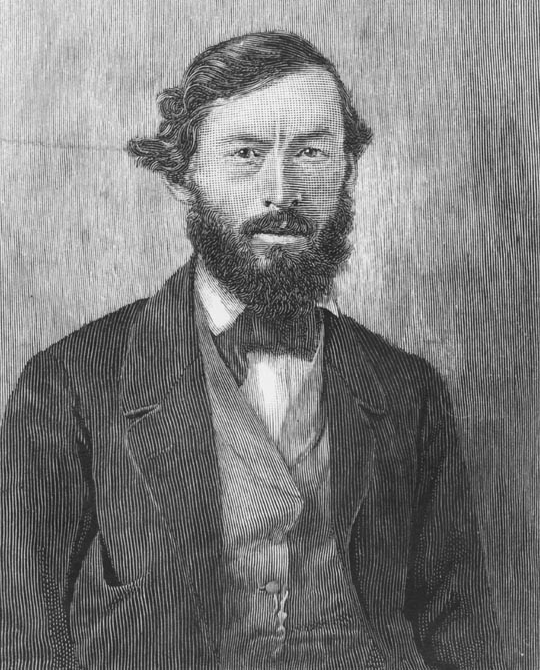
- John Taylor Wood

Naval Aide to the President of the Confederate States
- In office c. 1862 – 1865
- President: Jefferson Davis

Personal details
- Born: August 13, 1830 Fort Snelling, Michigan Territory, United States
- Died: July 19, 1904 (aged 73) Nova Scotia, Canada
- Relations: Zachary Taylor (grandfather)

Military service
- Allegiance: United States of America; Confederate States of America
- Branch/service: United States Navy; Confederate States Navy; Confederate States Army
- Years of service: 1847–1861 (USN); 1861–1865 (CSN)
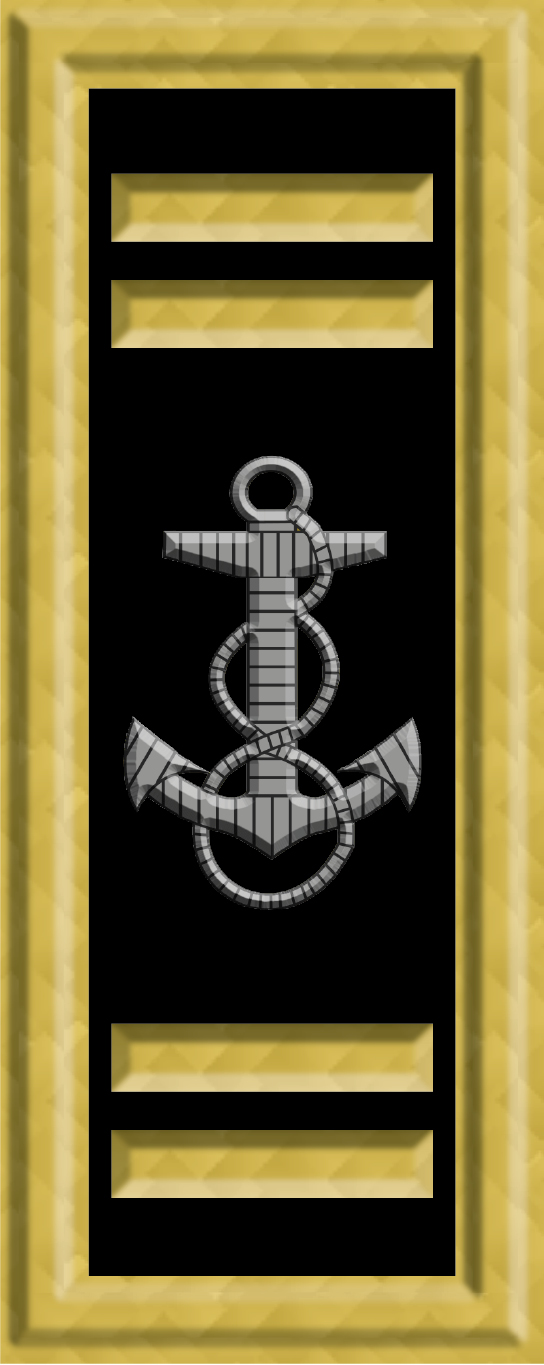
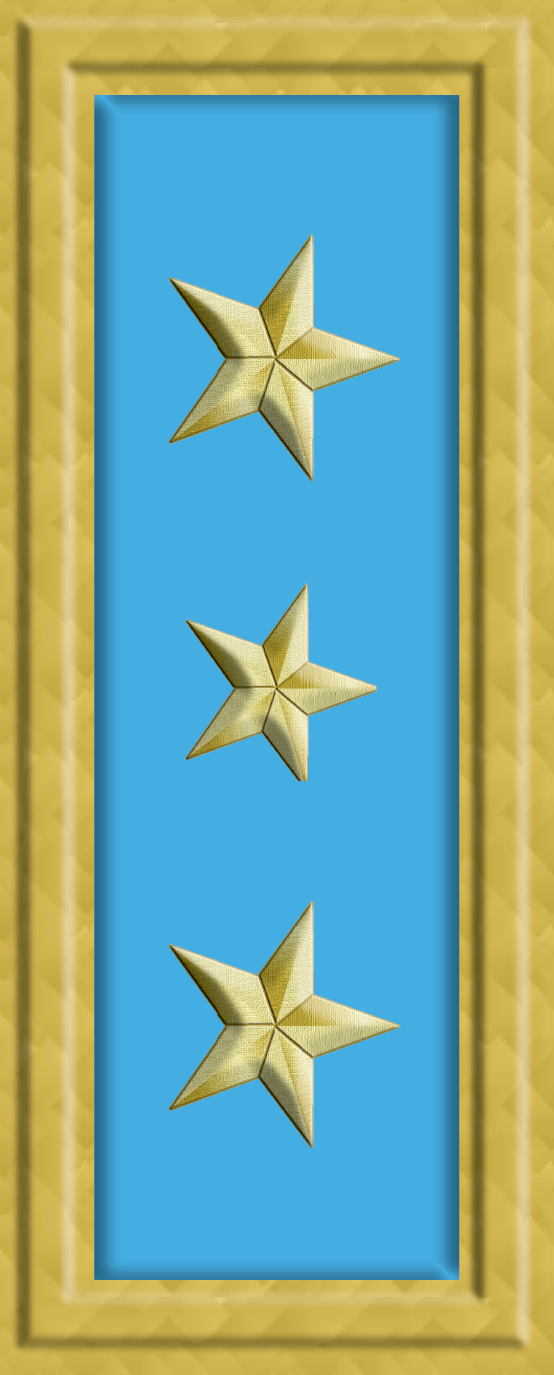
- Rank: Lieutenant (USN) Captain (CSN); Colonel
- Battles/wars: Mexican-American War; Suppression of the Slave Trade; American Civil War

John Taylor Wood (August 13, 1830 – July 19, 1904) was an officer in the United States Navy and the Confederate Navy. He resigned from the U.S. Navy at the beginning of the American Civil War, and became a "leading Confederate naval hero" as a captain in the Confederate Navy. He was a lieutenant serving aboard CSS Virginia when it engaged USS Monitor in 1862, one of the most famous naval battles in Civil War and U.S. Naval history. He was caught in 1865 in Georgia with Confederate President Jefferson Davis's party, but escaped and made his way to Cuba. From there, he got to Halifax, Nova Scotia, where he settled and became a merchant. His wife and children joined him there, and more children were born in Canada, which is where he lived out the remainder of his life.

== Early life ==
John Taylor Wood was the first child of Robert Crooke Wood from Rhode Island, an army surgeon, and Ann Mackall Taylor, eldest daughter of Zachary Taylor, who would become a major general in the United States Army, a hero of the Mexican–American War, and who would serve as 12th president of the United States, serving from 1849 to 1850. Robert Crooke Wood and Zachary Taylor served together in the U.S. Army. Along with being a grandson of President Taylor and First Lady Margaret Mackall Smith, John Taylor Wood was also a nephew of Sarah Knox Taylor (1814–1835), the first wife of future Confederate president Jefferson Davis.

Wood was born on August 13, 1830, at Fort Snelling then in the Northwest Territory near present-day St. Paul, Minnesota. Wood was delivered by his father and is claimed to have been the first white child born in Minnesota. From 1832 until 1837, the Wood family lived at Fort Crawford located at the junction of the Mississippi and Wisconsin Rivers. Young Wood grew up in the frontier at the time of the Black Hawk War.

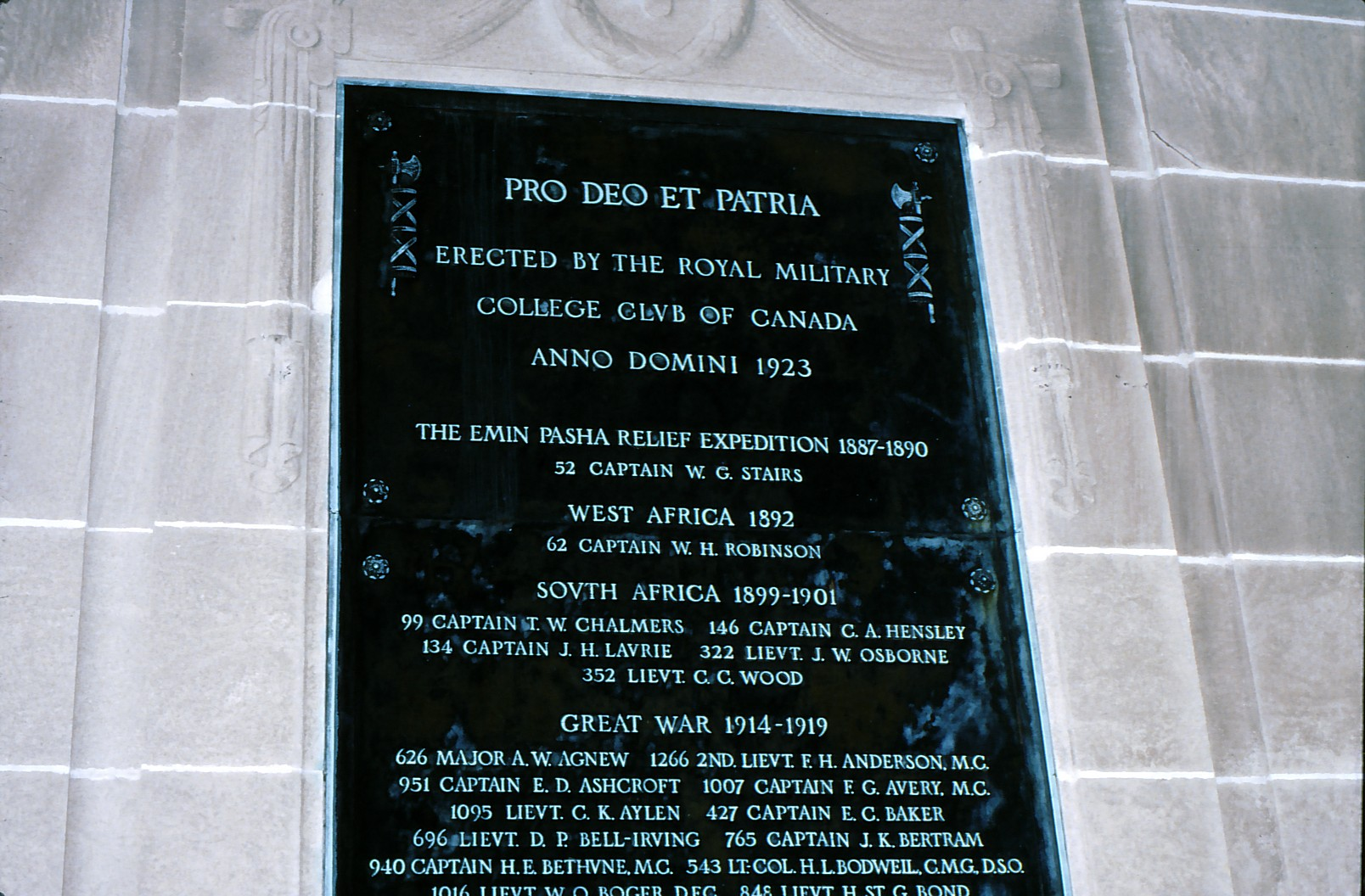
Memorial arch - Royal Military College of Canada

=== Marriage and family ===
Wood married Lola Mackubin in 1856, after getting his first assignments in the Navy. He and his wife had eleven children. Zachary Taylor Wood (1860–1915), the oldest son, became Acting Royal Canadian Mounted Police (RCMP) Commissioner and Commissioner of the Yukon Territory from 1902 to 1903. Charles Carroll Wood (b. 1876 – d. 1899), the youngest son, graduated from the Royal Military College of Canada 1896 (student #352). He served as a lieutenant for Canada in the Boer War and died in battle in 1899. He is memorialized on the Royal Military College Memorial Arch and the South African War Memorial (Halifax).

== Military career ==
Wood became a U.S. Navy midshipman on April 7, 1847. He joined the crew of the frigate USS Brandywine which sailed to Brazil. Soon after he transferred to USS Ohio and sailed for the west coast of Mexico in 1847. Soon after arriving off the Mexican port of Mazzatan later that year Wood joined a thousand-sailor force that landed to capture the port city where he first experienced combat while commanding a gun crew. At the end of the Mexican War in 1848, Wood returned to Ohio and saw service in the newly acquired California territory during the gold rush. After serving at sea on Ohio for three years, Wood's ship returned to Boston where he was given a three-month leave of absence. During his time aboard Ohio, Zachary Taylor had become president.

Wood served for a time aboard Ohio alongside William Hall and later supported Hall's US Navy pension claim.

=== Suppression of African slave trade ===
Wood served at sea during the last part of the Mexican–American War, performing shore duty as a Naval Academy officer. During the last part of the war he sailed off the coast of Africa suppressing the African slave trade and in the Mediterranean. He served aboard USS Porpoise patrolling in the Gulf of Guinea when it captured a Spanish slave ship. His first command of a ship occurred when he was ordered to bring the captured Africans to Liberia and set them free. He was responsible for his ship, his crew, and three hundred and fifty prisoners. The voyage lasted three weeks and was pitted against stormy seas but Wood succeeded in reaching Monrovia with his ship and passengers intact. The authorities in Liberia denied Wood the right to land his human cargo in the capital and he was forced on another one hundred and fifty mile voyage to Grand Bassa. Once again Wood was confronted by governmental authorities and was told he could not land his cargo of captured and would be slaves. However, this time he did not comply, asserted his authority, and landed his human cargo. Wood returned to Porpoise and at age 21 had gained confidence as a commander from the experience.

=== Other service ===
Wood graduated second in his class from the U.S. Naval Academy in 1852. He then went on to serve on USS Cumberland on voyage about the Mediterranean which last two years. Cumberland was a ship that he would later fight against as a Confederate officer in the American Civil War. After returning to Annapolis, Maryland in September 1855, he received promotion to lieutenant. Wood returned to Maryland and met Lola Mackubin, daughter of a prominent Maryland politician. They were married on November 26, 1856. Their daughter, Anne, was born on September 18, 1857. In 1858 he served as a gunnery officer for eighteen months aboard USS Wabash. His infant daughter died in 1859 while he was in service.

=== Civil War ===
Lieutenant Wood taught gunnery tactics at the U.S. Naval Academy in Annapolis, at the beginning of the Civil War. Due to his southern sympathies, he resigned his commission on April 2, 1861, and took up farming nearby. He later went to Virginia and in October 1861, received a commission as a Confederate Navy first lieutenant, where he was appointed as officer in the Confederate States Navy by October and assigned to CSS Virginia in November.

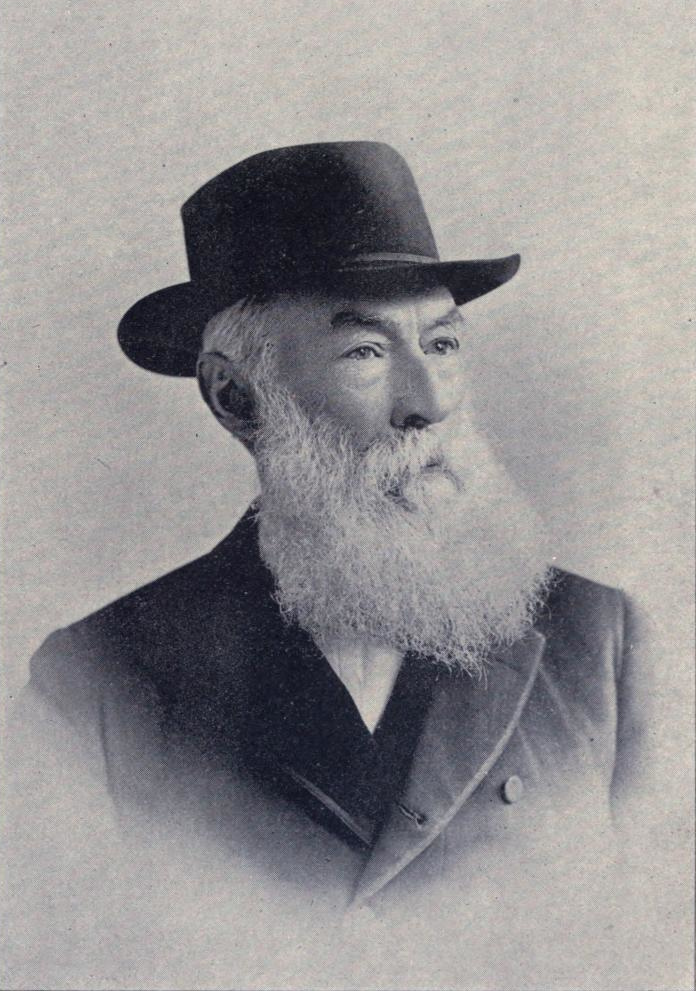
Wood in his later years

Following service with shore batteries on the Potomac River, he became an officer in the newly converted ironclad CSS Virginia serving under Commander Buchanan. He was wounded in the Battle of Hampton Roads. Wood commanded the stern pivot gun during the battle and fired the shot that seriously wounded Lieutenant John Lorimer Worden, captain of Monitor.

In May 1862, after Virginia was destroyed, Wood assisted with the defense of Drewry's Bluff, on the James River. During the next two years, Wood led several successful raids against Federal ships and also served as naval aide to Confederate President Jefferson Davis. Promoted to commander in May 1863, he simultaneously held the rank of colonel in the cavalry. These dual ranks, with his reputation for extraordinary daring and his family connections to Confederate leaders, allowed him to play an important liaison role between the South's army, navy and civil government.

In August 1864, Wood commanded CSS Tallahassee, a Confederate commerce raider and blockade runner against U.S. shipping off the Atlantic coast, capturing an astonishing 33 Union ships during a ten-day period off the coast of New England. He received the rank of captain in February 1865. A few months later, as the Confederacy was disintegrating, he accompanied President Davis in his attempt to evade capture and leave the country.

Though briefly taken prisoner, Wood escaped to Cuba. He subsequently went to Halifax, Nova Scotia, where he became a businessman. His wife and family joined him there, and they lived the rest of their lives in Nova Scotia. Wood died there on July 19, 1904. His obituary appeared in the New York Times the next day. He is buried in Halifax's Camp Hill Cemetery.

== Legacy ==
- Tallahassee Avenue, Tallahassee Elementary School, and Taylorwood Lane in Eastern Passage are named for Wood and his ship. *

== See also ==
- Bibliography of American Civil War naval history
- Military history of Nova Scotia
- Canada in the American Civil War

== Bibliography ==
- Bell, John (2002). Confederate Seadog: John Taylor Wood in War and Exile.
  McFarland. p. 178. ISBN 9780786413522., Book (par view)
- Butler, Lindley S. (2000). Pirates, Privateers, & Rebel Raiders of the Carolina Coast.
  UNC Press Books. p. 275. ISBN 9780807848630., Book (par view)
- Field, Ron (2011). Confederate Ironclad vs Union Ironclad: Hampton Roads.
  Osprey Publishing. p. 80. ISBN 9781780961415., Book (par view)
- Fuller, Howard J (2008). Clad in Iron: The American Civil War and the Challenge of British Naval Power.
  Annapolis, Maryland: Naval Institute Press. p. 409. ISBN 978-1-59114-297-3.
- Shingleton, Royce (1979). John Taylor Wood: Sea Ghost of the Confederacy.
  University of Georgia Press. p. 242. ISBN 9780820304663., Book (no view)
- Symonds, Craig L. (2009). The Civil War at Sea.
  ABC-CLIO. ISBN 9780275990848., Book (par view)
- Tucker, Spencer (2006). Blue & gray navies: the Civil War afloat.
  Naval Institute Press, Maryland. p. 426. ISBN 1-59114-882-0. Url

=== Other sources ===
- Winstead, Tim (2009). "John Taylor Wood: Man of Action, Man of Honor".
  Wilmington, North Carolina: The Cape Fear Civil War Round Table.

=== Further reading ===
- Royce Shingleton, John Taylor Wood: Sea Ghost of the Confederacy.
  University of Georgia Press. 1979. p. 242. ISBN 9780820304663., Book
- U.S. Naval Historical Center
