= Royce Shingleton =

American historian

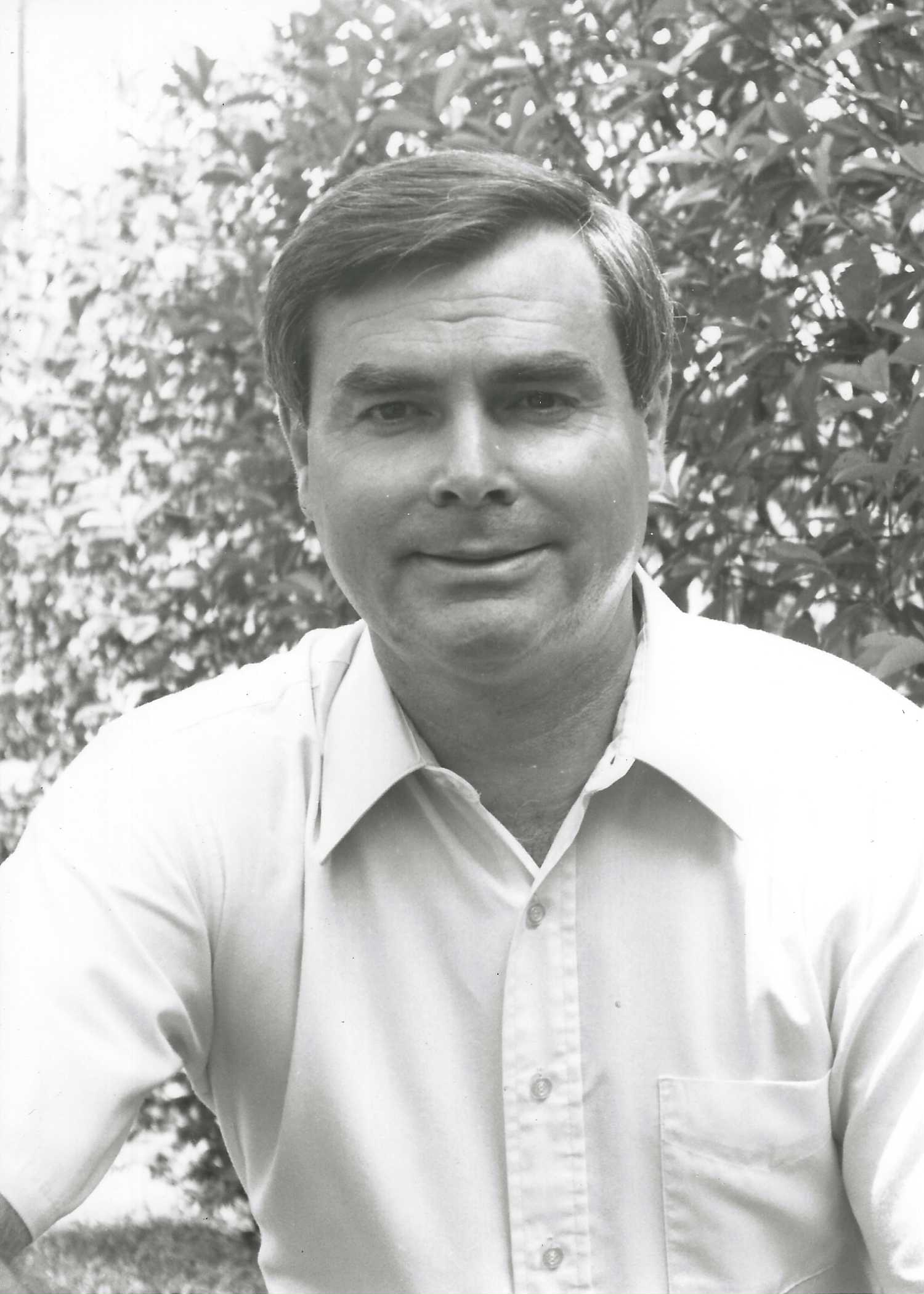
- Born: 1935 (age 90–91)
- Education: East Carolina University (B.S.); Appalachian State University (M.A.); Florida State University (Ph.D.)

Royce Shingleton is a retired American professor and author. He won several awards and is listed in - among others - Directory of American Scholars and Contemporary Authors. His scholarly endeavors have left an indelible mark on historical research.

== Early life ==
Shingleton was born in 1935 in the small eastern North Carolina town of Stantonsburg, to Wiley Thomas "Babe" and Lossie Vick Shingleton, the second son and fourth child of six. His father, a veteran of World War I, was a merchant and farmer.

Productive farmland surrounded Stantonsburg with historic Contentnea Creek (a tributary of the Neuse River that flows to the port of New Bern) forming the western boundary. In the town's business district, his father was a partner in Shingleton Brothers Hardware and Appliance (1914–1959), and the brothers also acquired some of the farmland there on Contentnea Creek.

Shingleton married Frances Ruth Bennett of Asheboro, North Carolina.

== Education ==
Shingleton graduated from Stantonsburg (NC) High School, where he was class president, in 1954 and then from East Carolina University, where he received a Bachelor of Science degree in social studies, in 1958.

He went on to complete a Master of Arts degree in social studies at Appalachian State University.

In 1971, he received a PhD in history from Florida State University. His dissertation is entitled "Rural Life in the Old South: The British Travelers' Image, 1820-1860" (Photocopy Ann Arbor, MI, University Microfilms, 1971, 338 pp.), completed under the supervision of Dr. William Warren Rogers, and is available for reference in special collections at certain libraries.

== Works ==
Among Shingleton's publications are three American Civil War era biographies. He received a Darton College Foundation Grant to commission the eight original maps for John Taylor Wood: Sea Ghost of the Confederacy, and its second printing (in both hardcover and paperback) was a National Historical Society Book Club edition. Working from Wood's family documents, his military career has been reconstructed. Moving boarding cutters overland by day, Wood emerged from unexpected places at night along the eastern seaboard to capture Union vessels in hand-to-hand combat. At the end of the war, Wood escaped along the eastern Florida coast to Cuba in one of the most famous escape stories in American history.

For his second book, Richard Peters: Champion of the New South, he received an Atlanta Foundation Grant. Richard Peters (Atlanta), was known for fulfilling the tenants of the New South. Before there was a New South, there was Richard Peters, who arrived in the rough-hewn crossroads town of Marthasville, Georgia in 1845 as superintendent of the Georgia Railroad. He was instrumental in changing the town name to Atlanta, maneuvered the transfer of the state capital to Atlanta, and donated the land on which the Georgia capitol sits. This biography sheds new light on an extraordinary individual whose contributions continue to enrich the South and the nation.

High Seas Confederate: The Life and Times of John Newland Maffitt (Studies in Maritime History), also had a second printing with a redesigned dust jacket, and won the Clarendon Award. Shingleton traces Maffitt's climb in rank and reputation among the Confederate officers in the first modern biography of the swashbuckling captain. Maffitt's courage, quick thinking, seamanship, and navigational skills made him effective in extraordinary runs through the Union blockade into southern ports. As commander of the C.S.S. Florida, he captured twenty-three merchant vessels in this adventure of life on the high seas during the Civil War.

Shingleton also contributed two chapters (chapter six - "The Officers" - and chapter seven - "Seamen, Landsmen, Firemen and Coal Heavers") to William Still's Confederate Navy: The Ships, Men and Organization 1861-1865. This comprehensive guide to the Confederate Navy covers its ships and men, its organization and facilities, its strategy and tactics, and its operations, including those on the Western rivers.

== Reviews ==
=== Wood ===
"Both a colonel in the Confederate army and a captain in the Confederate navy, [John Taylor] Wood has previously received only part of the historical attention he deserves. Now the 'sea ghost of the Confederacy' lives anew as a flesh-and-blood hero--thanks to the stylistic and scholarly skill of Royce Gordon Shingleton."

"The author has presented an extensively documented biography of a relatively unknown Confederate naval officer whose wartime career reads like that of C. S. Forester's fictional Horatio Hornblower. John Taylor Wood's whaleboat activities...resulted in the capture of eight vessels in inland waters...one of which was literally blasted apart by the guns of the fortifications at which it was moored in a futile attempt to drive off the boarding parties led by Wood [this was the U.S.S. Underwriter at New Bern, NC, probably Wood's most notable cutting-out expedition of the war]."

""A gem of a book...superb historical writing and research...remarkably objective critique [of the cruise of the commerce raider Tallahassee, a ship commanded by Wood]...original sources from Wood's papers and diary...highly readable--one almost wants to say brilliant. Sparklingly written and based upon sound scholarship, John Taylor Wood will long stand to remind all that history can be interestingly written and when it is, it is as fine a piece of literature as anyone could desire".

=== Peters ===
"Shingleton sees Henry W. Grady [editor of the influential newspaper Atlanta Constitution, and a friend of Richard Peters] as the greatest symbol and publicist of the New South, he believes that Peters was the major practitioner of the movement. Long before Grady was making his powerful addresses in the North concerning the New South, Peters was practicing the major tenets of the movement with his work in Georgia in the areas of transportation, urbanization, industrialization, and diversified farming....an excellent biography of a major figure."

"Richard Peters, an influential business leader who played a significant role in antebellum and reconstruction Atlanta...was the first person to use the new name Atlanta in place of the official Marthasville, [and] had a hand in moving the capital of Georgia to Atlanta. The author sees Peters as an example of Henry Grady's "New South" businessman...the young Grady spent time as a guest on Peters' farm [near Calhoun in north Georgia] and described his visits there in print....extensive background information on Atlanta and the South."

"This important book chronicles the life and entrepreneurial activities of Pennsylvania-born Richard Peters, who came to Georgia in 1835 as assistant railroad engineer and stayed to help lay the foundations for building the town of Terminus, Georgia [this was the earliest name of Atlanta because the locale was the terminus of a railroad], into the modern city of Atlanta. Shingleton is to be commended for rescuing Peters from relative historical obscurity in this well-researched and beautifully written addition to the literature of southern history. Photographs. Bibliographic essay. Index. Public and academic libraries at all levels."

=== Maffitt ===
In the 1992 issue of the Naval War College Review, Russell Ramsey wrote: "Contemporary students of the art of war will be surprised to see riverine tactics, joint operations, logistics, civil-military relations, undercover operations, innovative gadgetry, and battlefield intelligence all systematically treated in Royce G. Shingleton's page-snapping accounts of the 'Gray Ghost' navy. This writer is reminded after reading Shingleton's work of a certain other writer, Thucydides, who attended Plato's Academy hard by the banks of the Ilissus in a long ago and far away place called Athens. The comparison is not strained".

In 1997, an editor of this journal wrote: "Royce Shingleton was featured in an article entitled 'Rising Naval Historian' and as Ramsey stated, and still remains true today - Royce G. Shingleton's hallmarks are precision, deceptively easy prose, flowing narrative, and - vital for the military reader - linkage between resources, decisions and events. Shingleton addresses in detail Maffitťs wartime endeavors; their contribution to the Southern cause is a significant lesson in naval history that must not be forgotten. Hindsight makes clear that the obvious benefits brought by Maffitťs actions - although not realized during his lifetime - confirm the need for and value for a strong navy to a country's survival. This is more than an excellent adventure story of life on the high seas during the Civil War; it is a warning about the use and application of a nation's navy. As Maffitt said, 'the grand mistake of the South was neglecting her Navy'".

"This compact biography is in many senses a model work because it succinctly recounts the story of it protagonist, provides the basic chronology and facts, sets them in their larger matrix, and always allows the sources to speak for themselves. In particular, the details of the life of the young naval officer are presented in more detail than elsewhere, with solid use of the Maffitt letters and service record....High Seas Confederate will undoubtedly remain the standard biography of John Newland Maffitt, and a key volume in Confederate navel historiography, for years to come."

== Bibliography ==
- John Taylor Wood: Sea Ghost of the Confederacy, University of Georgia Press, 1979. Second printing, 1982. (National Historical Society Book Club Selection)
- Richard Peters: Champion of the New South, Mercer University Press, 1985. (Received Grant from the Atlanta Foundation)
- High Seas Confederate: The Life and Times of John Newland Maffitt, University of South Carolina Press, 1994. Second printing, 1995. (Won the Clarendon Award)
- Still, William; Shingleton, Royce (January 1, 1997). The Confederate Navy: The Ships, Men and Organization, 1861-65. Conway Maritime Press. (Contributed two chapters)

In addition to the publications listed above, Dr. Shingleton has also written over fifty articles, including peer book reviews, articles in historical journals, popular history magazines, reference books, and newspapers.

== Internal References ==
- Joseph Nicholson Barney
- Bibliography of Early United States Naval History
- Blockade Runners of the American Civil War
- Confederate Powderworks
- Crenshaw Company
- Kimball House (Atlanta)
- John Campbell Lees
- John Newland Maffitt (Naval officer)
- McIntosh, William
- John C. Peck
- Peters Park (Atlanta)
- Richard Peters (Atlanta)
- William Rabun
- John Taylor Wood

== External References ==
- Works by Royce G. Shingleton at Internet Archive
- Family History - ECU Joyner Libraries: Author Facet; Bernard Cornwell
- Royce Shingleton Papers - Collection Guides - East Carolina University ECU Digital Collections
- The Shirley Association - Descendants of Richard Shirley
- Royce Gordon Shingleton in Stanford Libraries' SearchWorks
- The American Civil War: A Handbook of Literature and Research by Steven Woodworth
- NCPedia - Maffitt, John Newland
- NCPedia - Underwriter, USS
