= Frank Warfield Crowder =

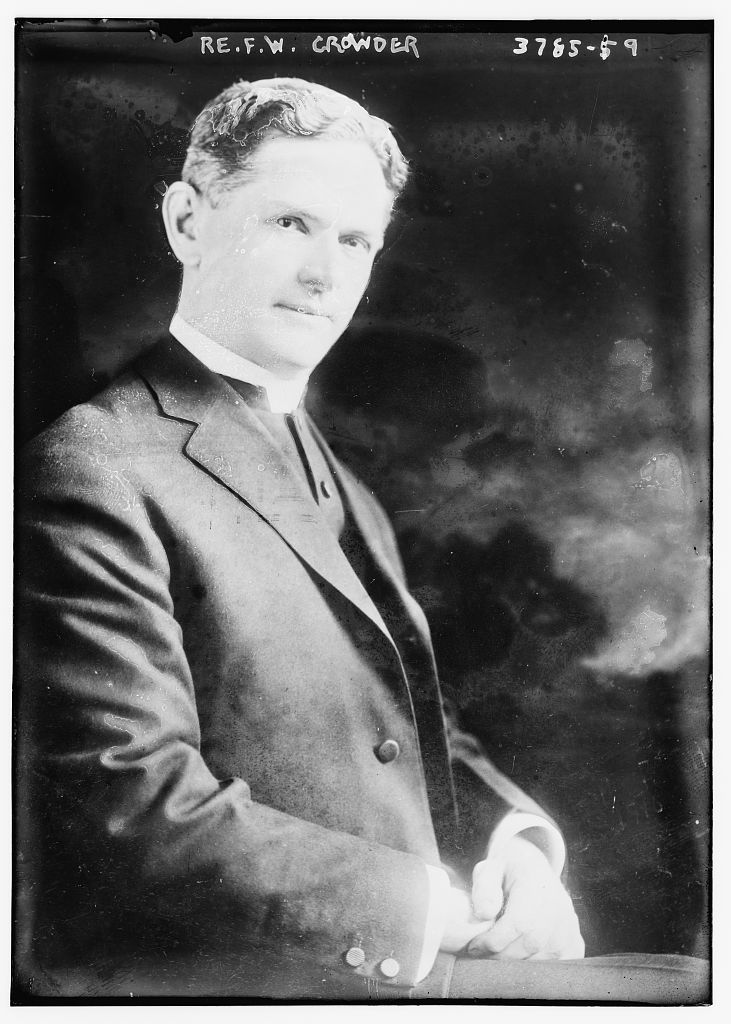
Frank Warfield Crowder in 1915

Reverend Frank Warfield Crowder (June 6, 1869 – September 27, 1932) was the rector of St. James' Episcopal Church in New York City. He was a supporter of the death penalty.

== Biography ==
He was born on June 6, 1869, to Alexander N. Crowder and Deborah Jane Warfield, in Baltimore, Maryland. He graduated from Dickinson College in 1890.

He was a reverend in the Rowayton section of Norwalk, Connecticut, from 1890 to 1893.

He married Louetta Plitt (1868-1936) on April 11, 1893, and they had as their son, Maxwell Alexander Warfield Crowder (1898-1915).

He died on September 27, 1932, at Johns Hopkins Hospital in Baltimore, Maryland. He was buried in Loudon Park Cemetery in Baltimore, Maryland.
