= Frederick Courtney =

British-born Anglican bishop (1837–1918)

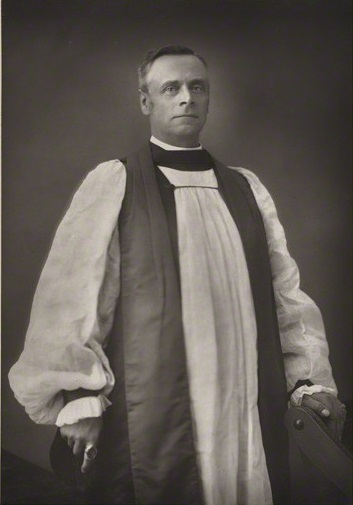
Courtney in 1889

Frederick Courtney (5 January 1837 – 29 December 1918) was an eminent Anglican bishop, the fifth Bishop of Nova Scotia.

== Life and career ==
Born in Plymouth into an ecclesiastical family – his father was Septimus Courtney, vicar of Charles Chapel – he was educated at King's College London and ordained in 1864. His first post was a curacy at Hadlow, Kent after which he was the incumbent of Charles Chapel, Plymouth (which became St Luke's) until 1870 and then St Jude's, Glasgow until 1876 when he emigrated to North America. He was an Assistant at St Thomas's, New York City until 1880 then Rector of St James's, Chicago. His last post before appointment to the episcopate was at St Paul's, Boston.

After he retired as Bishop of Nova Scotia in 1904, he returned to New York to serve as Rector of St James' Church on Madison Avenue, a position from which he retired in 1915. He died in New York on 29 December 1918.

Religious titles
Preceded by Hibbert Binney	Bishop of Nova Scotia; 1888–1904	Succeeded by Clarendon Worrell
