= George Sennott =

American lawyer (1830–1879)

- Born: January 1, 1830
- Died: July 1879; Hot Springs, Arkansas, United States
- Other name: Geo. Sennott
- Education: University of Vermont
- Occupations: Lawyer, abolitionist
- Political party: Democratic
- Father: Jonathan Peckham Miller

George Sennott (January 1, 1830 – July 1879) was an American lawyer and abolitionist. He was the legal defense for two of the John Brown's raiders in 1859. In his lifetime, Sennott was considered one of the best known lawyers in Boston, according to The Boston Post.

== Early life and education ==
George Sennott may have been of either Irish or French descent. He was an adopted son of a Col. Jonathan Peckham Miller from Montpelier, Vermont, a noted abolitionist and member of the Underground Railroad network from Vermont.

He attended the University of Vermont, graduating in 1848. Sennott moved to Boston in order to learn and practice law. He read law with Rufus Choate (similar to a legal apprenticeship), a politician from the Massachusetts Whig Party; and with Robert Rantoul Jr., a politician from the Massachusetts Democratic Party. He passed the Massachusetts Bar in Suffolk County in 1853.

== Career ==
=== Green and Copeland (1859) ===
In 1859, Sennott defended Shields Green, and John Anthony Copeland Jr. who were accused of treason and the murder of "Mr. Burleigh" in Charles Town, Virginia (now West Virginia). They were associates of John Brown and "colored" members of John Brown's raiders, who took part in John Brown's raid on Harpers Ferry. Sennott make known he was honored to defend the Black agitators, and he boldly condemned slavery.

He cited the Dred Scott decision (Dred Scott v. Sandford, 1857) to defend the African Americans accused of treason, noting that since they could not be citizens they could not commit treason. Green and Copeland were found guilty, and executed by hanging on December 16, 1859.

=== United States vs. Gordon (1862) ===
In 1862, Sennott was the counsel for the Gordon family of Boston, accused of treason. The Gordon family was from New England and included a father, Charles P. Gordon and four sons (including Henry), who all worked as silversmiths. They attended a private meeting hosted by Deacon Palmer, in which they were questioned about loyalty and responded they would not hang the American flag outside. They were accused of having sympathy for the American South during the Civil War. A speech by Sennott was published in the 1860s, titled The Beauties of Puritanic Abolitionism; Withering Denunciations of Power-Proud Aristocrats, which discussed the Boston trial.

This case was considered a matter of freedom of speech. There was no proof that the Gordons had done any act, or given any aid, or tried to obstruct enlistment, or otherwise to assist in the war; and this case was dropped.

=== Other work ===
In March 1860, right before the execution of two other Brown raiders, Albert Hazlett and Aaron Dwight Stevens, Sennott addressed the Virginia Legislature and pleaded for mercy.

In 1859, he wrote to George Luther Stearns. In 1862, his letter to John Albion Andrew was published, about Andrew and Benjamin Franklin Butler.

Sennott was part of John Brown's volunteer legal counsel in 1866.

== Personal life and death ==
Sennott was a Douglas Democrat, and Jacksonian Democrat. Anecdotes were published about Sennott, making light of his drinking, behavior in court, and sauciness. He had a personal interest in Greek history and the classics.

Sennott died in July 1879, at the age of 53 from "dropsy", in Hot Springs, Arkansas.

== See also ==
- George Henry Hoyt, legal counsel for John Brown
- Abolitionism in the United States
- Billy (slave), a slave accused of treason for joining the British side during the American Revolution
- Carlisle v. United States
