= William B. Thompson =

American politician

Member of the Virginia House of Delegates from the Jefferson County district
- In office December 7, 1846-December 3, 1848 Serving with Andrew Hunter
- Preceded by: Benjamin T. Towner
- Succeeded by: John A. Thompson (WV)

Personal details
- Born: 1797 Virginia, U.S.
- Died: after 1870 Frederick, Maryland, U.S.
- Occupation: farmer

William B. Thompson (1797 – after 1870) was a Virginia farmer and politician who served a term in the Virginia House of Delegates representing Jefferson County, Virginia.

Jefferson County voters elected him as one of their (part-time) representatives in the Virginia House of Delegates in 1846, but neither he nor Jefferson County's other part-time delegate during that session, lawyer Andrew Hunter, won re-election. Although he shared a similar common name with Will Thompson, one of John Brown's raiders who died in the raid on Harper's Ferry (in Jefferson County) (ironically shot by Hunter's son in the militia, Henry Clay Hunter), the Virginia delegate was a different man. The raider was from near Lake Placid, in Essex County, New York. Will Thompson, his brother Dauphin Thompson and his brother-in-law Capt. Watson Brown arrived in Chambersburg, Pennsylvania during the summer of 1858.

The farmer Thompson by contrast likely was related to a Presbyterian preacher of the same surname, whose descendants lived along the Shenandoah Valley and in western Virginia. Likely, this Thompson (who didn't own slaves, nor did he show in Jefferson County's 1850 census) moved with his wife and child further along the National Road (or B&O Railroad) to adjoining Morgan County, where he shows as owning just $1000 worth of land in the 1850 census. Farmer "William Thompson" shows in the 1860 state census in Morgan County, and another man with the same name lived even further along the railroad or National Road in Berkeley County in the same year (but such state censuses are not digitized for online access). In the 1870 federal census, William Thompson at age 73 still farmed at Rock Gap in Morgan County, West Virginia, with his wife and several children, and his land had increased in value to $2500 (plus he owned $800 in personal property). His successor in the House of Delegates might be a relative, or the railroad worker John A. Thompson (born circa 1820) who appears on the 1870 U.S. Federal Census for Martinsburg in Berkeley County, West Virginia, but probably not the Fairfax, Virginia miller in that census.
