= Albert Hazlett =

Participant in John Brown's raid on Harpers Ferry

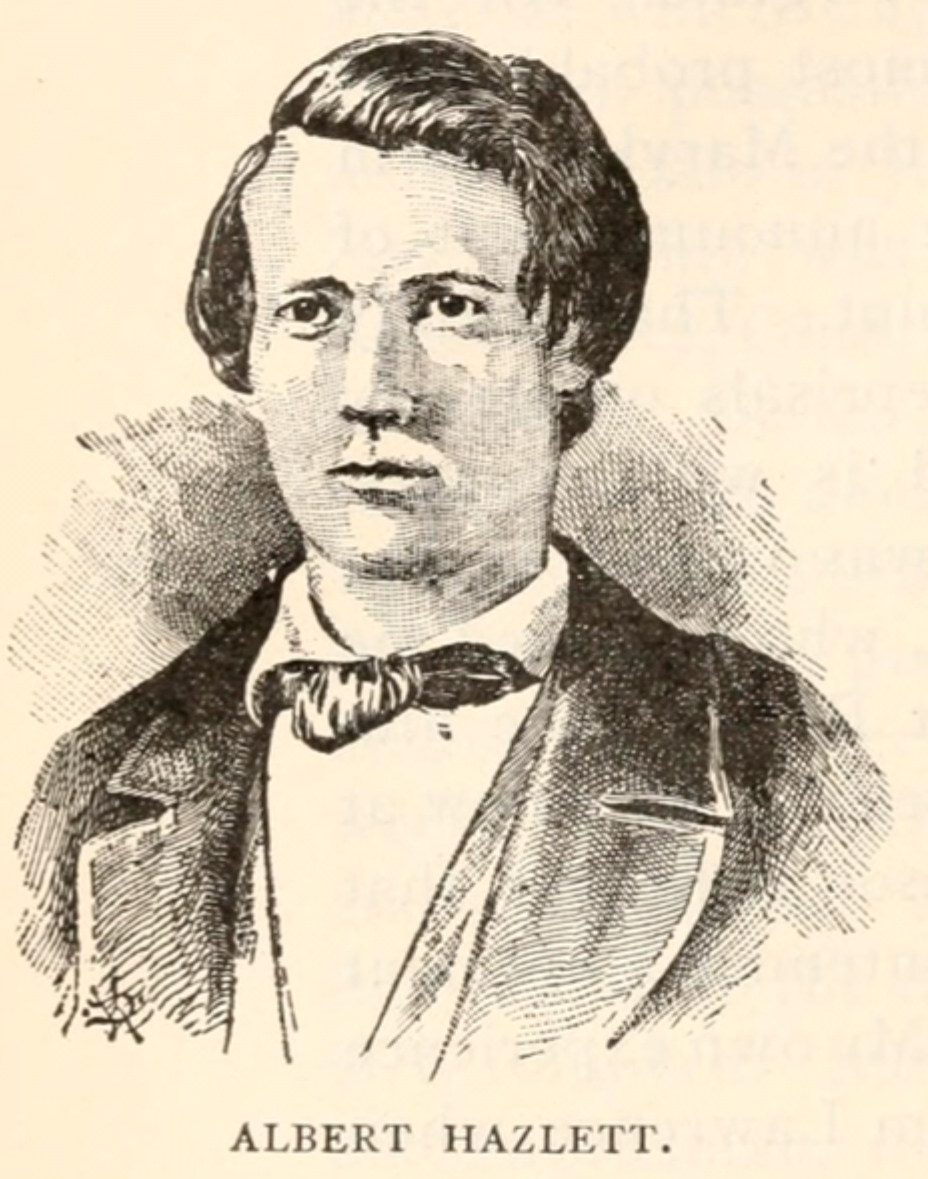
Portrait of Hazlett in 1894

Albert Hazlett (c. 1836 – March 16, 1860; né Absalom Hazlett) was an American abolitionist, and participant in John Brown's raid on Harpers Ferry (October 16 to 18, 1859). He was executed for his role in the raid.

== Early life ==
Absalom Hazlett, commonly known as Albert Hazlett, was born about 1838 in Indiana County, Pennsylvania. His parents were Sarah (née Miller) Hazlett, of Bedford Township, Bedford County, Pennsylvania and Alexander Hazlett, whose father William Hazlett lived in Bedford County, Pennsylvania before moving in 1825 to Mechanicsburg, Pennsylvania. Alexander became a stonemason and relocated with the jobs he accepted. The family was poor and many of the children had ongoing lung illnesses.

Hazlett, his wife, and 6 children lived in Center Township, Indiana County, Pennsylvania in 1840. Hazlett and his family lived near the head of the dam of the Old Upper Twolick flouring mill in 1845.

In 1850, Absalom (12) lived on a farm in Green Township, Indiana County, Pennsylvania with his parents, an older brother Washington (16), and younger siblings Peter (10), Jeremiah (9), Henry (7), Mary (3) and Sarah (1). The family was also said in an article about Alexander and Sarah Hazlett's children to include John, William, and Jonas — listed before the younger children, except Washington, from the 1850 census. (Note: Using common sense, it seems that one of the three brothers may have first named Washington and his two other brothers lived outside of the family home by the time the 1850 was taken. For instance, Absalom was generally known as Albert.) About 1850, Alexander inherited 50 acres of farm land from his sister Mary McKane. The farm was located one-half mile southeast of the Twolick Bridge off of the Ebensburg Pike. His father, Alexander, died in May 1856.

Hazlett settled in Bourbon County, Kansas after moving to the territory in 1857. He met John Brown, the abolitionist, in the territory and joined Brown's party. Hazlett served under James Montgomery (a Jayhawker during the Bleeding Kansas era), where Hazlett was a "brave and efficient" soldier. Hazlett served as an officer under John Henry Kagi in the winter of 1857–1858. With nine men, he fought with the Free State forces of Kansas and won a battle against 80 men.

He had returned to his mother's farm (after his father's death in 1856 and before John Brown's raid on Harpers Ferry in 1859) to harvest her crops with her mother's neighbor James Morrow Campbell. Hazlett was summoned by a messenger and left the farm.

== Raid on Harper's Ferry ==
According to the Indiana Gazette, Hazlett participated in John Brown's raid on Harpers Ferry. Summarizing the event, the newspaper said,

Fights over the very concept of slavery itself — the ownership of people and forced servitude — began well before the start of the war in 1861, and arguably the most notorious was the October 1859 attack led by John Brown on the federal arsenal and rifle factory at Harpers Ferry, Virginia. His quest was to disarm the state's military, to arm slaves and lead the way to freedom for about 3.9 million slaves.

At Harpers Ferry, Virginia, Hazlett fought next to Aaron Dwight Stevens, a commander of the raid. He was later captured at Carlisle, Pennsylvania, near the Pennsylvania border and was taken to Virginia.

== Imprisonment and death ==
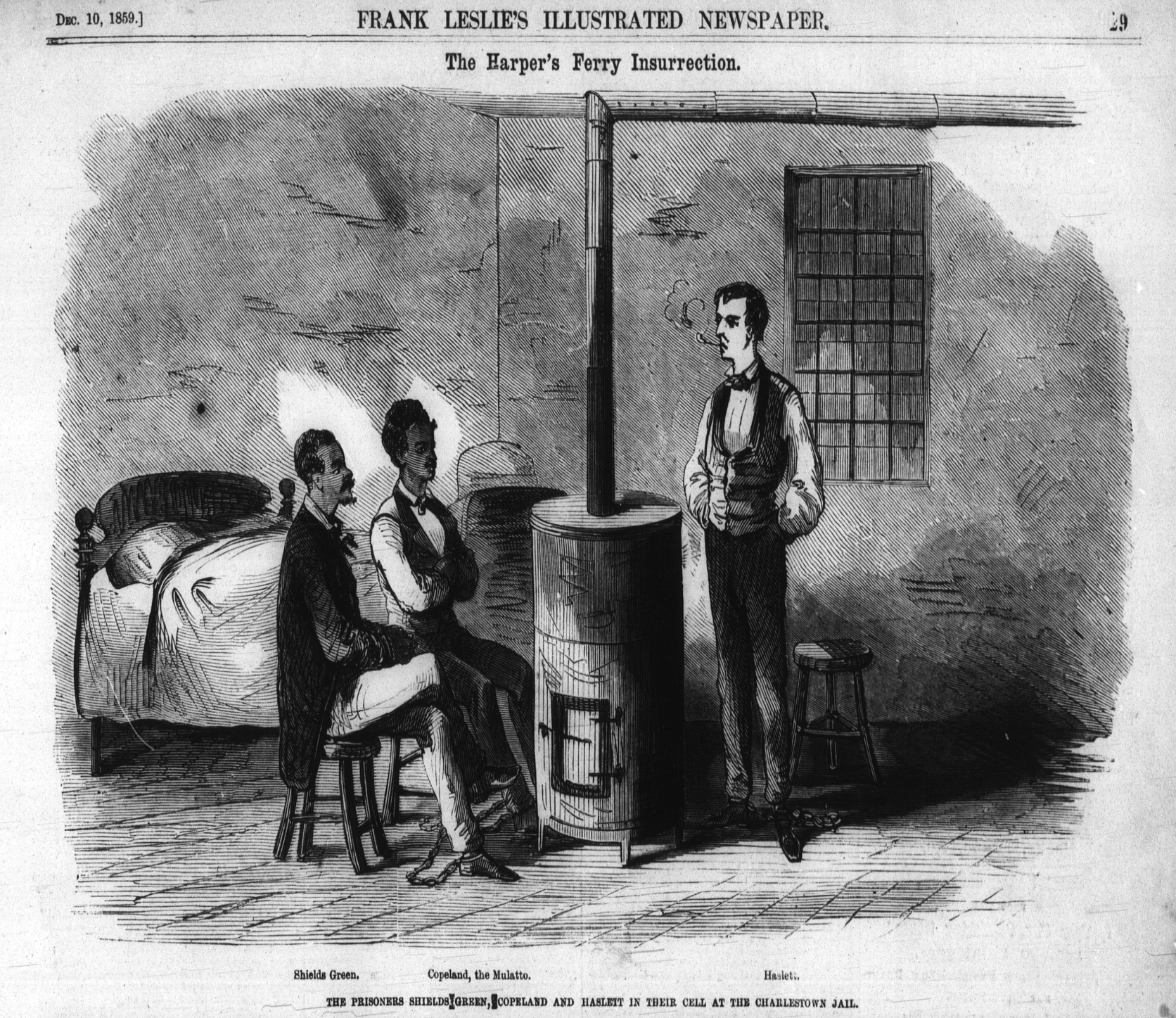
Albert Hazlett, Shields Green, and John Anthony Copeland in their cell in the Charles Town, Jefferson County, Virginia (now West Virginia) jail

Hazlett was imprisoned in Charles Town, Virginia, now Charles Town, West Virginia, where he was visited by his brother from Armstrong County, Pennsylvania for several days until March 15, 1860, the day before his execution. (Note: Reportedly his brother Jonas, who looked very similar to the un-bearded Hazlett, wanted to shave his beard and be executed in Hazlett's place. He disuaded him, saying "No, I have helped strike the blow to free the slaves and I will die for the right".)

Hazlett and Stevens were executed at on March 16, 1860, at Charles Town. According to the Evening Star, the men were sent to "that bourne from which no traveler returneth". After their death, Hazlett's and Steven's bodies were taken to Harpers Ferry, Virginia where they were met by Hazlett's brother and Steven's sister and fiancé. Hazlett's intended bride, Miss Stephenson accompanied the corpse to Eaglewood Cemetery in Perth Amboy, New Jersey. Miss Stephenson later married Jonas Hazlett.

At the time of their execution, all but four of the participants in the raid had been captured and martyred.

== Historic marker and biography ==
The Pennsylvania Historical and Museum Commission erected a marker in remembrance of Hazlett in 2002. The marker is located on South 6th Street, Pennsylvania Route 954, at 40°34′40″N 79°7′59″W in Indiana, Pennsylvania. It states:

A staunch abolitionist, Hazlett became a lieutenant in John Brown’s provisional army and participated in the raid on Harper’s Ferry Arsenal in 1859. He was captured, tried, convicted, and hanged for his involvement following the failed Harper's Ferry attack. This incident, intended to arm slaves to fight for their own freedom, was a major catalyst for the outbreak of the Civil War. Hazlett was born and raised near here.

It was selected by the Pennsylvania Historical and Museum Commission for his historical role as an abolitionist in 1859 (later executed for his participation that year in John Brown's raid on Harpers Ferry). Spencer Sadler wrote the biography Absalom Hazlett: A Loyal Soldier in John Brown’s Army, which was one of the series "America Through Time: Adding Color to American History" that was commissioned by Fonthill Media LLC.

== See also ==
- Osborne Perry Anderson an African-American abolitionist and the only surviving African-American member of John Brown's raid on Harpers Ferry.
- John Anthony Copeland Jr. joined John Brown's raid on Harpers Ferry. He was captured, and a marshal from Ohio came to Charles Town to serve him with the indictment.
- Shields Green was a leader in John Brown's raid on Harpers Ferry, in October 1859.
- Silas Soule supported and was a proponent of John Brown's movement.
