= Sterling G. Cato =

Judge of Supreme Court of the Territory of Kansas

Sterling G. Cato (c. 1807 – October 24, 1867) was an American attorney and jurist who served as an associate judge of the Supreme Court of the Kansas Territory.

== Early life ==
Cato was born in Alabama. He and his brother, Lewis Llewellen Cato, were both lawyers. Both lived in Eufaula, Alabama, until Sterling Cato moved to Kansas.

== Career ==
On September 13, 1855, Cato was nominated as a judge of the Supreme Court of the Kansas Territory by President Franklin Pierce, and took office on September 13, 1855, succeeding Judge Rush Elmore. During his time on the court, Cato made many pro-slavery judgements.

In 1856, Cato issued arrest warrants for John Brown, Sr. and many of his followers for their role in the Pottawatomie massacre.

On October 20, 1857, Cato ordered Governor Robert John Walker to accept the election of many pro-slavery candidates to the Kansas State Legislature; however, because of the election fraud that occurred with non-residents voting in the election, Walker refused to follow the order.

Cato left the court on October 13, 1858; judge Rush Elmore, also his predecessor, became his successor.

== Later life and death ==
After leaving the court, Cato moved to St. Louis, Missouri, and entered private practice.

Cato died on October 24, 1867, in Liberty, Missouri.
