= Rush Elmore =

American judge (1819-1864)

Rush Elmore (February 27, 1819 - August 14, 1864) was an American attorney and jurist who served as an associate judge of the Supreme Court of the Kansas Territory.

== Early life ==
Elmore was born in Autauga County, Alabama, on February 27, 1819. His father, John Archer Elmore, was a soldier in the American Revolution who served under General Nathanael Greene. He attended the University of Alabama.

Rush Elmore entered private practice in Montgomery, Alabama after studying at the University of Alabama. In May 1846, at the start of the Mexican-American War, Elmore led an American company as a captain.

== Career ==
In 1854, Elmore was appointed by President Franklin Pierce to become an associate judge of the newly formed Supreme Court of the Kansas Territory.

In 1855, Pierce removed Elmore, Johnston, and then-Governor Andrew Horatio Reeder after accusations were made against them for illegally purchasing Native American land. Elmore was replaced by judge Sterling G. Cato. However, these accusations were later found to be false, and Elmore was reinstated by President James Buchanan in 1858 upon Cato's resignation.

In 1857, Elmore helped draft and advocate for the Lecompton Constitution.

On January 31, 1857, Elmore assaulted John Henry Kagi, an abolitionist and lawyer, with both men firing at each other.

== Later life and death ==
Elmore left the Court in 1860, upon Kansas' admission into the Union. Although he was a supporter of slavery in Kansas, he disagreed with secession and remained loyal to the United States. He continued in private practice in Topeka, Kansas, until his death there on August 19, 1864.
