= John Henry Kagi =

American lawyer who participated in John Brown's Raid

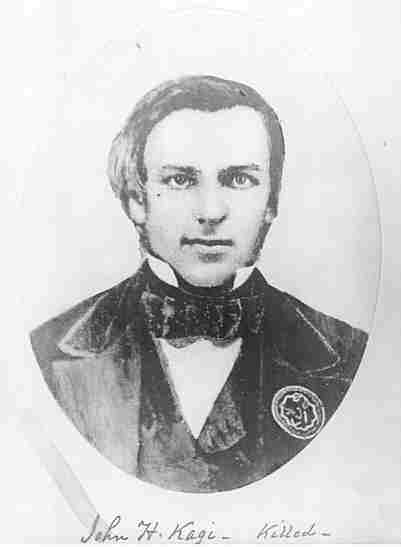
John H. Kagi

John Henry Kagi, also spelled John Henri Kagi (March 15, 1835 – October 17, 1859), was an American attorney, abolitionist, and second in command to John Brown in Brown's failed raid on Harper's Ferry. He bore the title of "Secretary of War" in Brown's "provisional government." At age 24, Kagi was killed during the raid. He had previously been active in fighting on the abolitionist side in 1856 in "Bleeding Kansas". He was considered an excellent debater and speaker.

== Early life ==
John Henry Kagi was born in Bristolville, Ohio, in 1835, the second child of blacksmith Abraham Neff Kagy (as spelled on his gravestone) and Anna Fansler, who were of Swiss descent. John Henry Kagi adopted the Swiss spelling of the family name.

Though largely self-taught, he was the best educated of Brown's raiders. He was a stenographer, at the time a useful skill for a reporter. He was Associate Editor of the Topeka Tribune and the Kansas correspondent of the New York Post and the abolitionist National Era; his contributions are signed "K." He was the "western correspondent" of the New York Tribune, and writings of his are found in several other newspapers.

He was an able businessman, totally abstained from alcohol, and, in contrast with John Brown, was agnostic.

In 1854–55 he taught school in Hawkinstown, Shenandoah County, Virginia, near his father's birthplace, but he was compelled to leave, and never return to Hawkinstown, due to his anti-slavery views. A relative, the Virginia historian Dr. John W. Wayland, wrote the most complete monograph on Kagi and his activities.

== Abolitionist activities ==
In 1855, Kagi traveled west and stayed at the cabin of his sister Barbara Kagy Mayhew and her husband Allen in Nebraska City. The Mayhew Cabin was the first site in Nebraska recognized by the National Park Service as it was used as part of the Underground Railroad.

While living with the Mayhew's, Kagi earned the ability to practice law and taught Phonography. By 1856, Kagi went south to join the abolitionists working to make Kansas a free state, serving under General James H. Lane. Later Kagi enlisted in Aaron Stevens's ("Captain Whipple's") Second Kansas Militia, and met the abolitionist John Brown in Lawrence; another source says they met in Topeka. Deeply influenced by the man, Stevens and Kagi became two of Brown's closest advisers.

On August 16, 1856, Kagi participated in the attack on "Fort Titus," the homestead of pro-slavery leader Henry Theodore Titus, a mile (1.4 km) from Lecompton, Kansas. He was captured a month later by United States Army troops along with 100 men of Col. Harvey's company, who had just attacked Hickory Point. Kagi was charged with eight counts, including arson, manslaughter, and murder. He was imprisoned in Lecompton, then at Tecumseh, both in Kansas, escaping from the later place with other indicted Freestate prisoners. Kagi was slightly wounded in the chest in a gun fight with pro-slavery Judge Rush Elmore on January 31, 1857—a memorandum-book in his pocket stopped a bullet—but shot Elmore in the thigh. Later that year Kagi tried to help Brown organize a military school in Tabor, Iowa. He undertook military training in the Quaker community of Pedee, in Cedar County, Iowa.

Brown and his group went to Upper Canada to organize their effort. On May 8, 1858, in a black church in Chatham, Ontario, they adopted Brown's "Provisional Constitution and Ordinances for the people of the United States", and Kagi was named Secretary of War.

Kagi and Brown returned with their men to Kansas, where they lived in a reinforced cabin on Little Sugar Creek, near Mound City. In November 1858, Kagi and others defended the cabin from an armed posse while Brown was away. On December 20, 1858, Brown led twelve men, and Kagi led another party of eight men, into Missouri to free slaves. Brown's party freed ten slaves, but Kagi's freed only one and killed the slave's owner.

While they planned the raid on Harper's Ferry, Kagi acted as the business agent of the Brown's group, buying and storing weapons in Chambersburg, Pennsylvania. At Chambersburg he lived with Brown at the Mary Ritner house, which still stands at 225 East King Street. On August 19, Brown (using the name Isaac Smith) and Kagi met with Frederick Douglass and Shields Green at an abandoned quarry outside of Chambersburg to discuss the raid. According to Douglass's later account, Brown described the planned raid in detail and Douglass advised him against it.

Kagi was killed by militia forces during the Harper's Ferry raid as he tried to escape across the Shenandoah River from Hall's Rifle Works. His body was first buried, with most of the other raiders killed during the raid, in a packing crate on the far side of the Shenandoah. Forty years later, in 1899, the remains of Kagi and nine other raiders were reinterred in a common grave next to John Brown's grave at John Brown Farm State Historic Site.

== In popular culture ==
As a character in the novels:

- Raising Holy Hell (1995)
- Flashman and the Angel of the Lord (1996)
- Cloudsplitter (1998)
- The Good Lord Bird (2013)

== See also ==
- John Brown's raiders

== Further reading (most recent first) ==
- Van Winkle, Cathleen M. (2022). Battles of Freedom: The Life and Times of John Henri Kagi. [Author is past President of the Mayhew Cabin Foundation.] Lincoln, NE: Self-published. 41 pp.
- Wayland, John W. (1961). John Kagi and John Brown. [Kagi was a first cousin of the author's mother.] Strasburg, Virginia: Shenandoah Publishing House. 137 pp.
- Bartling, Edward D (1943). John Henry Kagi and the Old Log Cabin Home (3rd ed.). Nebraska City, Nebraska.
- Wayland, John W. (October 1942). "John Henry Kagi, John Brown's Secretary of War". Americana: 594–637.
- Wayland, John W. (1909). "One of John Brown's Men". Pennsylvania-German. 10: 1–11.
