= Oberlin Heritage Center =

Coordinates: 41.2896627°N 82.2184544°W

The Oberlin Heritage Center is a non-profit 501(c)(3) organization, governed by an 18-member Board of Trustees. The organization is funded by memberships, annual fund contributions, investments, grants, fund-raising projects and planned gifts. Over 700 members hail from Oberlin and elsewhere in Lorain County, as well as from across the country.

== Sites ==
Its complex of historic sites includes the Monroe House (1866), Jewett House (1884) and Little Red Schoolhouse (1836–1837). Guided tours of the three sites are offered on a walk-in basis three days a week and at other times for groups by appointment. Main themes of the tour include life in the 1830s – c. 1915 Oberlin, African American history, the Underground Railroad, women's history, scientific discovery, and missionary, temperance, and other reform movements.

The brick Italianate-style Monroe House was originally the home of General Giles W. Shurtleff, leader of the first African-American regiment from Ohio to serve in the American Civil War. The house became the longtime home of James Monroe and his wife, Julia Finney Monroe. He was an important abolitionist, advocate of voting rights for African-Americans, and friend of Frederick Douglass. Monroe taught at Oberlin College, served as a U.S. Consul to Brazil, and was a five-term U.S. Congressman. Mrs. Monroe was a daughter of Charles Grandison Finney, the great religious leader of Oberlin College.

The brick Victorian Jewett House was the home of Oberlin College chemistry professor Frank Fanning Jewett and his wife, Sarah Frances Gulick Jewett, author of numerous books on public health and hygiene, daughter of Luther Halsey Gulick Sr. and sister of Luther Halsey Gulick Jr. The Jewetts and the subsequent owners, the Hubbards, rented rooms to male Oberlin College students, who slept in the attic and studied on the second floor. One of Jewett's students was Charles Martin Hall, who discovered the cost-effective process for commercially manufactured aluminum. The house and simple woodshed feature an exhibit called Aluminum: The Oberlin Connection, which includes a re-creation of Hall's 1886 woodshed experiment.

The Little Red Schoolhouse was the first public school in town. Notably, in defiance of Ohio's "Black Laws", the school was interracial from its inception. Sarah Margru Kinson, who as a young girl was on board the infamous La Amistad, returned later to America and became one of the first Africans to attend the school. Restored as a pioneer-era one-room school, the Little Red Schoolhouse offers visitors a hands-on look at life and education in the 1800s.

== History ==
The roots of the Oberlin Heritage Center date back to the Oberlin Village Improvement Society, founded in 1903 by a group of concerned citizens to beautify and improve the town, and the Oberlin Historical society, organized in 1960 to preserve the Little Red Schoolhouse and the Monroe House. The two volunteer groups merged in 1964 as the Oberlin Historical and Improvement Organization (O.H.I.O.). The organization has grown since hiring two professional staff members in 1993, and in 2005 was renamed "The Oberlin Heritage Center".

The Oberlin Heritage Center is now a small museum. In 2006 it was selected to be part of the National Trust for Historic Preservation's Partner Places program. The National Park Service designated the Oberlin Heritage Center as a facility on its National Underground Railroad Network to Freedom in 2004. The organization also prepared the nomination for the National Trust for Historic Preservation's selection of Oberlin as one of its 2004 Dozen Distinctive Destinations.
