= Shields Green =

American former slave and participant in John Brown's Raid (1836–1859)

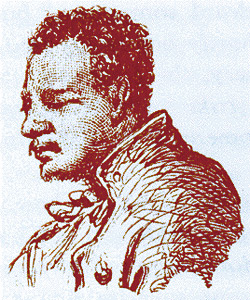
- Green awaiting his trial after the Harpers Ferry raid
- Born: c. 1836; South Carolina, U.S.
- Died: December 16, 1859 (aged 22–23); Charles Town, Virginia (now West Virginia), U.S.
- Cause of death: Hanging
- Resting place: Winchester, Virginia (grave unknown)
- Other name: Emperor
- Known for: Raid on Harpers Ferry
- Criminal charges: Murder and inciting a slave insurrection; charge of treason dropped
- Criminal penalty: Death by hanging
- Criminal status: Executed

Shields Green (1836? – December 16, 1859), who also referred to himself as "Emperor", was, according to Frederick Douglass, an escaped slave from Charleston, South Carolina, and a leader in John Brown's raid on Harpers Ferry, in October 1859. He had lived for almost two years in the house of Douglass, in Rochester, New York, and Douglass introduced him there to Brown.

Although Green survived the raid unwounded, he was tried, convicted, and executed by hanging on December 16, 1859, together with three other raiders. All the trials and executions took place in Charles Town, West Virginia (at the time Charlestown, Virginia), county seat of Jefferson County. At John Brown's execution two weeks prior, very few spectators were permitted, for security reasons. Now there were no restrictions, the judge wanted the executions to be seen by the public, and there were 1,600 spectators. At the time, legal as well as illegal hangings were entertainment.

Green was the only one from the raid on Harpers Ferry that Frederick Douglass mentioned alongside iconic rebels Nat Turner and Denmark Vesey; Douglass "eulogized [him] with rare pathos". In an article on courageous negroes who revolted he is mentioned alongside Douglass himself and Haitian leader Jean-Jacques Dessalines. In Silas X. Floyd's Floyd's Flowers, or Duty and Beauty for Colored Children, Green is a Black hero like Crispus Attucks, Toussaint l'Ouverture, or Benjamin Banneker. Floyd calls him a martyr.

== Lack of information about Green ==
Information about Green is fragmentary and inconsistent. As with Nat Turner, there is a single source that everyone has used, Frederick Douglass, yet the reliability of that source has been questioned by Louis DeCaro, author of the only book on Green.

Of the seven men who were tried, convicted, and executed after the raid—five white and two Black—less information is available about Green than about any of the others. He was a good shot, according to two separate eyewitnesses; he used his rifle and revolver "rapidly and diligently", according to another. But he was the most illiterate of the raiders—"very illiterate" as the Richmond Dispatch put it—although one newspaper reports him reading the Bible. He neither wrote nor received letters during his two months in the Jefferson County jail. (He could easily have gotten someone to write letters for him.) No one visited him, or even tried to; there was no one to bury his body. The press and the legal system were far more concerned about the white prisoners than about the Blacks. The other Black prisoner, John Copeland, was a fountain of information, in comparison, and his skin was much lighter, which at the time gave him more credibility than Green. Although we have good evidence that Green had at least one son, in South Carolina, he kept this a secret and so far as we know had no contact with him. Of the five Black members of John Brown's raiders, Green was the only one of whom, in 2009, no descendants could be located.

"A man of few words", according to Douglass; there was no particular attempt to extract information from him by either the press or the legal system. They were far more interested in the white prisoners; Cook, in his published confession, seldom refers to "negroes", and never by name. Of the five Black members of Brown's party, Green is the only one of whom there is no daguerreotype image, although we have sketches by four different artists, including one of him alone, published for the first time in 2020. Copeland supplied all the information the press or legal system felt was needed from the Blacks of the party. "Copeland is an intelligent negro", wrote one who visited all the prisoners in jail in November. He does not say that about Green, who he visits next, implying that Green is less intelligent. He continues:

Shields Green, or Emperor, said to me that he had been at Brown's house in Maryland ever since the latter part of August; that when he went there he did not know that anything was to be done but run off slaves. He had never heard that force was to be used against the whites, only persuasion with the negroes. That when he arrived at Brown's quarters he was taken up stairs and never allowed to come down again except to attend calls of nature, after which he was compelled to return. He was not allowed to write or communicate with anyone except Brown's men. He stated that a number of the men were similarly restricted. He said he knew nothing of Fred Douglass in the Harper's Ferry matter; that all the proceedings were kept from him; that he would have left Brown before the attack if he could have done so. He said running off slaves is quite unprofitable, and recommended everybody not to attempt it hereafter. ...He [Cook] fully corroborated the statement made by Green, the negro, in reference to the watch that was kept on a part of the men who were at Brown's house. He said that that portion of them who were kept upstairs did not know anything of the intentions of Brown until 11 o'clock on the Sunday morning before Harper's Ferry was taken. The Constitution was then read to them by Stevens, and that some of them did not then seem to understand it. He denied, with feeling, that he ever came to Harper's Ferry as a spy.

Green's life is in essence divided into two parts: before Douglass and after Douglass. He enters written history when he started living in Douglass's house, in Rochester, New York, about two years before Brown's raid. Douglass gives us essential information—were it not for him, we would not know that Green was an escaped slave.

But one interviewer considered Green as "not much inferior to Fred. Douglass" in education, and a Virginia physician, who thought Green showed no evidence of education, nevertheless added that he was "said to be finely educated." He was particularly abused in cross-examination by Prosecutor Andrew Hunter, and although his legal testimony was minimal, legal historian Steven Lubet asserts that it "is therefore entirely possible, or even likely, that Judge Parker, himself a slave owner, did not allow the black prisoners any meaningful occasion to speak at sentencing." As a result of these circumstances, we have very little information about Green, and writers on John Brown's raiders say little or nothing on him.

== Physical appearance ==
As was usual at the time, Green's skin color was commented on: he was "a negro of the blackest hue", "a black negro", "a full blooded negro," "a regular out-and-out tar-colored darkey." At that time, those of darker skin color, or "more African blood", were considered by whites to be inferior, less civilized than those with lighter brown skin, "mulattoes", usually the result of rape of female slaves by their white owners. In part because of his skin color, and in part because of his fighting skill, Green was "the most despised of Brown's captured men". "Of all the raiders to stand trial in Charlestown, Shields Green was the most notably harangued, maligned, and browbeaten by the vindictive prosecuting attorney—the harshest words being reserved for the darkest of the Harper's Ferry raiders."

His hair was short and curly.

He was described as "small in stature and very active in his movements". "He had rather a good countenance, and a sharp, intelligent look." James Monroe described his as "a fine, athletic figure".

Hinton says Green had "huge feet", but he never saw Green and there is no known source for this detail. He also says Green had "a Congo face", apparently a reference to his dark skin color.

== Names ==
=== Emperor ===
According to Douglass, living at his house when Brown visited was a "colored man who called himself by different names—sometimes 'Emperor', at other times, 'Shields Green'". On a business card he had printed in Rochester, New York, in 1858, Green referred to himself as "Shield Emperor."

The other rebels also referred to him as "Emperor". The meaning of or reason for the nickname of Emperor is unknown. Sometimes writers speculate that this may reflect some status among the African people he was supposedly kidnapped from, or his ancestry from African royalty. However appealing, there is no evidence to support these hypotheses. Green grew up in Charleston, South Carolina. The nickname may reflect his status as leader among other Blacks. In harmony with this is a link between the name and Green's bearing: "very officious..., evidently conscious of his own great importance in the enterprise". To the hostages he was "very impudent"; he told a hostage to "shut up". "He was very insulting to Brown's prisoners, constantly presenting his rifle and threatening to shoot some of them."

Sometimes he is referred to in the press only as Emperor: "The negro, Emperor, is the only one among them [the prisoners in Charles Town] who has a Bible, except old Brown". "The negro called 'Emperor of New York' taken prisoner is said to be the black man who was upon the stage with Douglass the night he lectured in this place [Chambersburg]."

=== Esau Brown ===
It is sometimes found in modern presentations of Green that his real name was Esau Brown. The only evidence for this is a single newspaper article of 1861. But according to Louis A. DeCaro, Jr., author of The Untold Story of Shields Green (2020), the only book thus far on his life, so far as is known Green never used the name Esau Brown, nor was it ever used by any of his Harpers Ferry associates. Frederick Douglass never referred to him by that name, nor is it found in documents concerning his trial and execution. The name never appears in any of the numerous newspaper reports of 1859. DeCaro concludes that it is "doubtful" that this single mention is correct. It may simply be a mishearing of "Emperor".

== Green's speech ==
Like other aspects of Green's life, the evidence about his speech is also somewhat contradictory.

In the first place, Green had no problem with understanding speech. He was present at the lengthy Brown-Douglass meeting in Chambersburg, and there is no comment that Green had any trouble understanding it. Nor is there such a comment anywhere else. He was not hard to talk to.

However, Green was "a man of few words, and his speech was singularly broken", as Douglass put it. DeCaro suggests he may have had a speech defect. Douglass did not come to Chambersburg with the intent of speaking publicly, but local Blacks recognized him and asked him to talk. He gave an impromptu lecture in Franklin Hall on what he said to them was his only topic, slavery. On Saturday, August 20, before meeting with Brown. Green, called "Emperor of New York", was "upon the stage with Douglass".

In a reminiscence in later life, John Brown's daughter Anne Brown Adams recalled an incident that took place when she and her sister-in-law, Martha, were being sent home to New York shortly before the raid. According to Anne, this man of few words felt moved to deliver "a farewell speech," which she called "the greatest conglomeration of all the big words in the dictionary, and out, that was ever piled up." According to Anne, even fellow raider Osborne Anderson jested that "God himself could not understand that". Knowledge of big words, however, does not mean literacy, as DeCaro supposes. High-faluting words were used constantly in political speeches, of which there were many more than today. Brown and Douglass alone used plenty of them.

On another occasion, Anne said that Green was "a perfect rattlebrain in talk; he used to annoy me very much, coming downstairs so often. He came near betraying and upsetting the whole business, by his careless letting a neighbor woman see him."

We have a number of sentences reported that Green said in different contexts. Aside from the attempt of Douglass, and Douglass alone, to reproduce a rural or uneducated pronunciation, the sentences are adequate, even eloquent:

- "Oh, what a poor fool I am!" said Green to his companion on the way. "I had got away out of slavery, and here I have got back into the eagle's claw again!"
- "Death from the hands of the law for no offense save for believing in liberty for myself and my race, would not be a degradation."

Once again, if reportage on the raid by Southern journalists lacks interviews with Green, this is because Brown's men were largely overshadowed by Brown in general, and because the Black raiders were treated with even less regard than were the white raiders, and of the Black raiders, from any reporter's point of view Copeland was preferable.

== Green's life ==
=== Before 1857 ===
It is not clear when Green first arrived in Rochester, New York, or how long he actually stayed in the Douglass home. It was not unusual for the Douglass home to serve as a sanctuary for fugitives from slavery. Information about Green's life before that is fragmentary.

According to Douglass, Green was an escaped slave from Charleston, South Carolina; According to an unpublished document unearthed by Louis DeCaro, he grew up in Charleston. He was an urban man, "much out of his element under the open skies of the Maryland countryside." Fugitive slaves always said they were free, except to people they trusted; the court documents in Charles Town describe him as "a free negro", as he claimed. On the other hand, Green told a reporter after his trial that he was born of free parents, while a reporter covering Green's trial for The New York Herald wrote that "the count of treason was abandoned since it was not proven that Green was a free person." Douglass did not reveal Green's true status until long after his death.

Different accounts have his age from 23 to 30. According to DeCaro, if he did participate in the 1850 "excitement" (riot) in Harrisburg, he must have been in his early thirties. Four pages earlier DeCaro has him "in his mid-thirties at the time of the Harper's Ferry raid".

Green was a widower. According to the Charleston Daily News of June 7, 1870, a son of his was living in Charleston. The names of his wife and his son are unknown. His owner and occupation are unknown. There may have been more than one son, but aside from this nothing else is known of his life in South Carolina. It was not easy to get away; he escaped hidden in cargo on a ship. Without citing any source, an article on the numerous Black sailors reports that Green had been one. Strangely, there is no newspaper advertisement seeking recovery of a Black so easily recognizable (because of his speech defect, as well as his skin color).

Governor Wise, when he came to Harpers Ferry to interview participants in the raid, said "I immediately examined the leader. Brown, his lieutenant, Stevens, a White man named Coppie, and a negro from Canada. They made full confessions."

As Green was not talkative, and uncaptured fugitive slaves do not leave much of a paper trail, there is not much reliable information on Green before he met Douglass.

- News stories after the raid said he was from Iowa,
- Harrisburg, Pennsylvania, where he "was conspicuous in the fugitive slave riot at Harrisburg some years ago", On the same front page of The New York Times just cited, another dispatch says he was from Iowa.
- [[Pittsburgh, Pennsylvania|Pittsburg [sic], Pennsylvania]],
- and Rochester, New York, A single story says in one paragraph that Green was from Harrisburg, and in another that he was from Pittsburg [sic].
- Another lists "a negro named Shields Green who came to join Brown from Pittsburgh", but later on the same page says that "Emperor" was from "New York—formerly of South Carolina".
- "Shields Green alias Emperor, New York, raised in South Carolina"
- "Emperor, of New York, raised in South Carolina, not wounded, a prisoner—the latter was elected a member of Congress of the Provisional Government some time since"
- "Emperor, New York—formerly of South Carolina" "Emperor, also negro, is in chains at Harper's Ferry"
- Mistakenly calling him "Gains", one of the first reports relates that "the negro...says he lived in Harrisburg, Pennsylvania," adding that "Gains is a bad fellow, and no truth in him. He told several palpable lies while telling his story."
- In Robert E. Lee's report he is called "Green Shields (alias Emperor)" and once "(alias S. Emperor)".
- One wstory mentioning Harrisburg describes Green as "a somewhat notorious character".
- One person from Oberlin, Ohio, where Green's name is on a cenotaph together with those of raiders Copeland and Leary, said that Green had lived there for some time; another that he could not possibly have lived there.
- "Green was an ambitious, vindictive, but very illiterate negro of the African species, and evidently died a victim of his own brutish impetuosity. He was the head and front of all the negro rescues at Harrisburg for several years past, a journeyman barber by trade."

==== Green's supposed connection with Oberlin ====
There is a cenotaph monument in Oberlin to three young Black men from Oberlin who participated in John Brown's raid on Harpers Ferry. The other two are John Anthony Copeland and Lewis Sheridan Leary. About their residence in Oberlin there is no doubt. The situation regarding Green is confusing and the pieces of evidence impossible to reconcile.

Local Blacks, working in 1860 on a monument to the colored men of Oberlin that were with John Brown at Harper's Ferry, said that "Shields Green was but little known to us, excepting as he has been made known to the nation and the world by his manly conduct, his patient and heroic endurance in prison, and his pious, courageous and consistent deportment as be stood on the fatal gallows." Copeland, after his arrest, was asked who else from Oberlin was at Harpers Ferry, and he said that besides himself, only Leary. The Oberlin Evangelist of November 9 says two of Brown's men were from Oberlin. An Ohio man said that "the negro Green and Edwin Coppic at one time lived near Salem." Salem, Ohio, is 90 miles (140 km) east of Oberlin. He continues: "I think Copeland was the only man who went to John Brown from Oberlin."

The reference to Green having lived in Oberlin is from Oberlin College professor James Monroe. At the request of Copeland's parents, who as free Blacks were barred from entering Virginia, he travelled to Winchester, Virginia, just after the December 16, 1859, execution of Green, Copeland, and two others. As there was no one protecting their graves, the bodies of Green and Copeland were dug up within hours by students and faculty of the Winchester Medical College, for use in anatomy classes, in which the corpses were dissected. At the time, this was a common way of using or disposing of unclaimed bodies.

Monroe tried but failed to recover Copeland's body so his parents could bury it; students threatened violence, and they stole the body from the College and hid it. However, as he had a few hours free, a medical college professor gave him a tour, and in the dissecting rooms:

I was startled to find the body of another Oberlin neighbor whom I had often met upon our streets, a colored man named Shields Greene [sic]. I had indeed known that he also had been executed at Charlestown, as one of John Brown's associates, but my warm interest in another object had banished the thought of him from my mind. It was a sad sight. I was sorry I had come to the building; and yet who was I, that I should be spared a view of what my fellow-creatures had to suffer? A fine, athletic figure, he was lying on his back—the unclosed, wistful eyes staring wildly upward, as if seeking, in a better world, for some solution of the dark problems of horror and oppression so hard to be explained in this.

No one other than anatomy students was interested in Green's body, not even Monroe.

Upon Monroe's return to Oberlin he gave a public report of his trip at a coffinless funeral for Copeland. These remarks immediately preceded the beginning of the efforts to build a monument to the Oberlin Blacks who participated in John Brown's raid on Harpers Ferry.

== Frederick Douglass's account ==
From January 28 through February 14, 1858, John Brown also stayed in Douglass's house, working on his Provisional Constitution.

Many years later, in 1881, Douglass again describes Green as a fugitive slave:

He was a fugitive slave from Charleston, South Carolina, and had attested his love of liberty by escaping from slavery and making his way through many dangers to Rochester, where he had lived in my family, and where he met the man with whom he went to the scaffold.

The person he had most contact with was Douglass, in whose house in Rochester, New York, he was living from 1857 to 1859. This was Douglass's second Rochester house, near Highland Park. Green met John Brown in Douglass's house; Brown stayed in Douglass's house at the same time, for weeks, so Brown had ample opportunities to get to know him.

Presumably Green came to Rochester because he was thinking of emigrating to Canada, as most Blacks entering Rochester were. But finding Douglass's Underground Railroad house, Douglass took a liking to him. Douglass knew the law well and could have coached Green on what to say, and Green was pretty quiet anyway. Living with Douglass, he worked as a waiter, launderer, and barber. Certainly preparing a business card, as Green did, advertising his clothes cleaning and giving his address (2 Spring St.), means he felt to some extent secure.

== Comments on Green's personality ==
In the case of the free negro Green, allusion was made by the counsel for the defense to an attempt to introduce impertinent evidence respecting the advances of the prisoner toward a mulatto girl at the time of the midnight entrance into the plantations. Mr. Hunter pursued his answering argument quietly, until he reached this point, and then, lifting himself to his full height, and compressing hie fine features to unwonted sternness—for he usually wears a smile—he turned upon the negro, and with a rapidity that certainly exhibited a wonderful acquaintance with the vocabulary of invective, hurled for a while incessant denunciation upon the guilty passions which he assumed to have inspired Shields Green to join the expedition. How the negro sat so stolid under it, I cannot understand, but the crowd that filled the hall blazed with fury, and clenched fists in agonies of virtuous indignation. I suppose that the consciousness of having offered endless similar impure examples never entered their minds at all. Mr. Hunter, however, gained new and blushing honors. It was his best display of the season, and far surpassed anything offered by other orators.

Osborne Anderson described him as "the Zouave of the band", an opinion repeated by Annie Brown.

"Of the four prisoners taken at the engine house, Shields Green, the most inexorable of all our party, a very Turco in his hatred against the stealers of men, was under Captain Hazlett, and consequently of our little band at the Arsenal; but when we were ordered by Captain Brown to return to our positions, after having driven the troops into the bridge, he mistook the order, and went to the engine house instead of with his own party. Had he remained with us, he might have eluded the vigilant Virginians. As it was, he was doomed, as is well-known, and became a free-will offering for freedom, with his comrade, John Copeland. Wiser and better man no doubt there were, but a braver man never lived than Shields Green".

"A little while prior to this, [Douglass] went down to [Chambersburg], to accompany Shields Green, whereupon a meeting of Capt. Brown, Kagi, and other distinguished persons, convened for consultation."

Years later Douglass described Green in his memoir:

Shields Green was not one to shrink from hardships or dangers. He was a man of few words, and his speech was singularly broken; but his courage and self-respect made him quite a dignified character.

Green requested when in the Charles Town jail that he have as few visitors as possible. While on the scaffold, in contrast with Copeland, he was "engaged in earnest prayer" (see drawing in DeCaro). "Green was an ambitious, vindictive, but very illiterate negro of the African species, and evidently died a victim to his own brutish impetuosity. He was the head and front of all the negro rescues at Harrisburg, for several years past, a Journeyman barber by trade."

Frederick Douglass said:

While at my house, John Brown made the acquaintance of a colored man who called himself by different names — sometimes 'Emperor,' at other times, 'Shields Green.' ...He was a fugitive slave, who had made his escape from Charleston; a state from which a slave found it no easy matter to run away. But Shields Green was not one to shrink from hardships or dangers. He was a man of few words, and his speech was singularly broken; but his courage and self-respect made him quite a dignified character. John Brown saw at once what 'stuff' Green was made of, and confided to him his plans and purposes. Green easily believed in Brown, and promised to go with him whenever he should be ready to move."

Lewis Washington, interviewed by the Senate Select Committee, discussed him thus after the raid:

Question. Did he use his arms; did he fire?

Answer. Yes, sir, very rapidly and dilligently.[sic] I do not know with what effect.

Question. What was his deportment?

Answer. It was rather impudent in the morning. I saw him order some gentlemen to shut a window, with a rifle raised at them. He said, "Shut that window, damn you; shut it instantly." He did it in a very impudent manner. But when the attack came on, he had thrown off his hat and all his equipments, and was endeavoring to represent himself as one of the slaves.

Green was similarly defiant at an encounter with a White while travelling from Hagerstown to the Kennedy farm.

The state's attorney, Andrew Hunter, lashed him furiously during the prosecution for his bold and unwavering stand at the trial:

As a pleader, his [Hunter's] manner was subdued, his diction strong and earnest, his voice deep and full, and he could make it ring at will. He did this, and with a touch of ferocity, too, when making his final argument for the conviction of Shields Green, till the crowd in and around the court-house blazed with fury at his denunciation of the black man who had attempted to free his race, and both as lighter and prisoner showed in rude, but vigorous manner, his utter disdain of men who sold mothers, dealt in men, bred children for sale, making concubines for profit of every ninth woman in the land."

"On the morning of December 2, the day of John Brown's execution, [S]hields Green sent word to his leader that he waited willingly and calmly for his own death, and that he was glad he had come."

"The evening previous to the starting of Captain Brown's followers from Rochester, I spent at the house of Mr. Frederick Douglass, and when ready for my walk home, Shields Green accompanied me. I said to him, while on our walk, "Do you know that by going with Captain Brown into a Southern State, you expose yourself to the gallows? That if you are taken you will surely be executed?" He answered, "Yes; I shall probably lose my life, but if my death will help to free my race, I am willing to die. I have suffered cruel blows frơm men who said they owned me. Death from the hands of the law for no offense, save for believing in liberty for myself and my race, would not be a degradation; but blows from an overseer's lash, crush into my soul."

Douglass: "When, by and by, a monument is built to John Brown, a niche must be reserved in it for Shields Green."

"Of the bravery exhibited at Harpers Ferry, no doubt Shields Green was foremost. Anderson wrote that 'Newby was a brave fellow' and when he was shot through the head by the trooper who took advantage of a mutual withdrawal, 'his death was promptly avenged by Shields Green,' who raised his rifle in an instant and 'brought down the cowardly murderer. Wiser and better men no doubt there were, but a braver men [sic] never lived than Shields Green'... [Ellipsis in the original.] Frederick Douglass said, 'If a monument should be erected to the memory of John Brown, as there ought to be, the form and name of Shields Green should have a conspicuous place on it.'"

Brown's son John Brown, Jr., who like his father met Green at Douglass's house, called him a "young friend".

He [Hunter] did this, and with a touch of ferocity, too, when making his final argument for the conviction of Shields Green, till the crowd in and around the courthouse blazed with fury at his denunciation of the black man who had attempted to free his race, and both as fighter and prisoner showed in rude, but vigorous manner, his utter disdain of men who sold mothers, dealt in men, bred children for sale, making concubines for profit of every ninth woman in the land.

The Virginian lawyers selected by the Examining Court to defend these prisoners had an ungracious and thankless task assigned them. Mr. Green was described by Correspondent House, of the New York Tribune, as a "most extraordinary man to look upon, ...long, angular, uncouth, and wild in gesture, ...deficient in all rhetorical graces. His words rush from his mouth scarce half made up. He speaks sentences abreast. ...His...'whar['] and ' thar' are the least of his offenses. His demeanor, altogether, is of unrivaled oddity; and yet his power is so decided that, while he is upon his legs, he carries everything before him.[page 349] He is the most remarkable man I have seen here, although not so impressive in his bearing as Mr. Andrew Hunter, who is a man of real nobility of presence." [Ellipses in the original.]

"Mr. Sennott fought vigorously for these men, and went the length of justifying them in their resistance to the enslavement of their race. The State Attorney, Hunter, was almost ferocious in his philippics against Shields Green. whose boldly careless bearing had aroused all the brutal malignity that slave ownership and race prejudice necessarily produced."

"Shields Green, a fugitive slave from Charlestown, S. C., who came with Frederick Douglass to Chambersburg, Pa., on the 19th of August preceding the outbreak, and entered the party at Kennedy Farm as in sort a representative of Mr. Douglass;"

"At the Kennedy Farm, the night before we were leaving for home (Martha and Anne), he came downstairs to listen to the 'Emperor's' (Shields Green) farewell speech, as he called it. This was the greatest conglomeration of big words that was ever piled up. Some one asked Anderson 'if he understood it,' and he replied, 'No, God Himself could not understand that.'" ¶ But the negro man with Congo face, big, misplaced words, and huge feet, knew instinctively what courageous manhood meant and how devotion acted. Frederick Douglass tells how, when he turned to leave the Chambersburg quarry, where his last interview with John Brown was had, that, on telling Green he could return with him to Rochester, New York, the latter had turned and looked at the strong but bowed figure of John Brown, weighted with the pain of Douglass's refusal to aid him in, as he termed it, "hiving the bees," and then asked: "Is he going to stay?" An affirmative answer being made, he looked again at the old leader, and slowly said, "Well, I guess I's goes wid de old man." When, a short time after O. P. Anderson and Albert Hazlett had decided the resistance then making to be hopeless, Green came, under fire, with some message, over to their station at the arsenal on the Potomac. Anderson told him he'd better go with them. He turned and looked toward the engine-house, before the door of which stood its few defenders, and asked: "You think der's no chance, Osborne?" "Not one," was the reply. "And de old Captain can't get away?" "No," said both the men. "Well," with a long look and slow [page 508] utterance, "I guess I'll go back to de old man." In the prison, Green, with Copeland and Leary, were constantly sending messages of regard to Captain Brown and Stevens, and on the morning of John Brown's execution he sent him word that he was glad he came, and that he waited willingly for his own death."

Green had left a boy in slavery; his wife dying before he made his escape. ...Green was a full-blooded black.... They were all intelligent, Green looking the least so, though possessed of considerable natural ability, vigor of character, and a courage which showed that if better trained he might have become a marked man."

A Rochester newspaper described him as "of course ignorant, though naturally intelligent, ...of a reckless disposition" He was "about twenty-five years of age, and has no family."

== Meeting of Brown and Douglass in Chambersburg ==
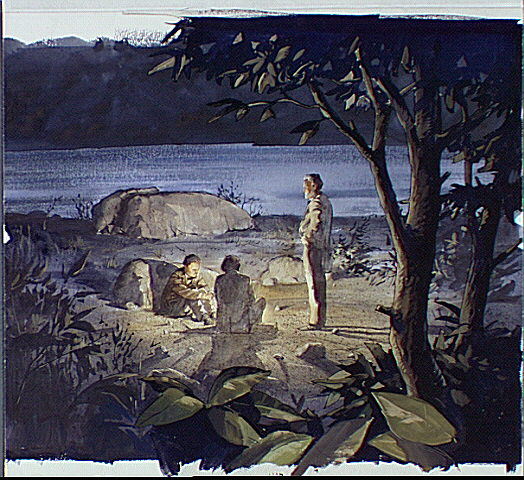
In a stone quarry near Chambersburg, Pennsylvania: Shields Green, with dark skin, is at center, Frederick Douglass on the left and John Brown on the right. Watercolor by Richard Schlecht.

By far the most dramatic and best-known moment in Green's life, which has been made into a play or movie script several times, was his meeting with Brown and Douglass in an abandoned stone quarry near Chambersburg, Pennsylvania, which lasted "a whole day and night". However, we have only a single source for this interview, Frederick Douglass, and his reliability has been questioned by Louis DeCaro, author of the only book-length study of Green.

Green first met John Brown at the house of the abolitionist Frederick Douglass in Rochester, where Green was living; Brown spent some weeks there, working on his Provisional Constitution from morning to night. Green and Douglass travelled together from Rochester via New York to Chambersburg, Pennsylvania, to meet with Brown and his second in command, John Henry Kagi. Brown, who knew "the stuff Green was made of", as Douglass put it, had asked Douglass to bring Green with him. The meeting took place in Chambersburg, an Underground Railroad stop, because it was the "staging ground" for Brown's raid; just 22 miles (35 km) from the Maryland border, it was the closest city in the (free) North. Brown was incognito. Jerry Anderson, Owen Brown, and Oliver Brown were also in Chambersburg, but did not participate in the meeting.

For secrecy, the meeting was in an abandoned stone quarry.

Brown tried in this meeting to get Douglass to join in the raid, because Douglass, a national Black leader, would have added credibility to it, motivating the enslaved to rise up and run away, as Brown would propose. Douglass declined to participate in Brown's planned raid because he believed it could not succeed and was, therefore, suicidal. Green declined Douglass's suggestion that he return to Rochester with him, saying, as reported by Douglass, "I believe I’ll go with the old man". During the raid, Green made a similar remark when invited to flee, as the raid was failing.

== Green and Douglass ==
Although neither Douglass nor Green mentions it, afterwards Green has been spoken of as a replacement for Douglass.

In an incident which became famous when it was made public over 20 years later, in August 1859 Douglass, accompanied by Green, traveled from Rochester to Chambersburg, Pennsylvania, for a secret meeting with Brown. In what became a central incident of Douglass's life, Douglass refused to join Brown's party, as he saw it as doomed, suicidal. More importantly, he demurred from enlisting Black support for Brown, which was of vital importance to Brown. While the two parted as friends, Brown was much disappointed in Douglass, and privately listed him as "unreliable." Frederick Douglass wrote the only description of this meeting in his third and final autobiography, conflating the chronology of events in 1859, including the fact that his disagreement with Brown over the seizure of the Harper's Ferry armory dated to earlier in 1859. Douglass returned to Rochester but Green refused to accompany him. Green then joined Brown and his men at a rented farm in Maryland, where he was sequestered along with the rest until the Harper's Ferry raid in October.

According to Douglass, Green could have escaped when it was clear the raid was failing, but he chose again to remain with Brown. However, this appears to have been a legend that Douglass himself initiated. According to fellow Black raider Osborne Anderson, Green actually confused orders during the fighting and ended up staying with Brown instead of escaping with Anderson.

Owen Brown escorted Green on his difficult 20 miles from Chambersburg to the Kennedy Farm; it was difficult and dangerous because of the many slave catchers watching the roads. Owen has left us a 20-page report on the trip. He describes Green as "more mindful and alert" than he was himself, spotting Whites first, telling Owen to remove his too visible white summer coat and put on Green's black cloak instead. From Chambersburg to Hagerstown, Maryland, the trip was by wagon, and from there Owen and Shields traveled on foot at night, across cornfields and thinly-wooded areas. Owen tells us that Green had been brought up in the city, and was very much out of his element in the Maryland countryside. At one point they had to cross a river, presumably Antietam Creek, and since Green could not swim Owen made a makeshift raft. Green was much disturbed at re-entering a slave state, fearing his capture. When they got to the farm, "A happier man than Shields Green was never seen. He was like a new man", according to Owen.

Douglass and Brown had another, little-known meeting on August 15, 1859. Brown travelled to Philadelphia from Chambersburg. He had heard there would be a street parade of a "colored military company" named the Frank Johnson Guards, and he found that the situation in Philadelphia was worse than he had feared. The "armed and disciplined" Black group was publicly exhorted by J. J. Simons, "one of Brown's lieutenants", to participate in the upcoming invasion of Virginia to free the slaves. Brown was in the audience, and late that night he was roused from bed by an urgent messenger who took him to a house where both Douglass and Brown were.

== The Harpers Ferry raid ==
During the raid, Green and others were assigned to recruit slaves from the nearby countryside to join the rebellion. Green was with Dangerfield Newby and Osborne Anderson at the Arsenal during the raid; Osborne said that Green immediately avenged Newby's death. According to Douglass, Osborne Anderson (not Jeremiah Anderson) said that Green could have escaped with him. "I told him to come; that we could do nothing more," But his reply was the same: "I b'l'eve I'll go down wid de ole man."

Green and Edwin Coppock were the only two of Brown's raiders who neither escaped nor were injured.

Green nearly killed Robert E. Lee. Colonel Washington told him not to shoot.

"Newby and Green, negroes, were stationed at the junction of High and Shenandoah rivers."

Washington said: "Shields Green was one of the men who took my carriage from my place."

After taking refuge in the "engine house", as it was called, Green's job was to supervise the hostages.

== Green's trial ==
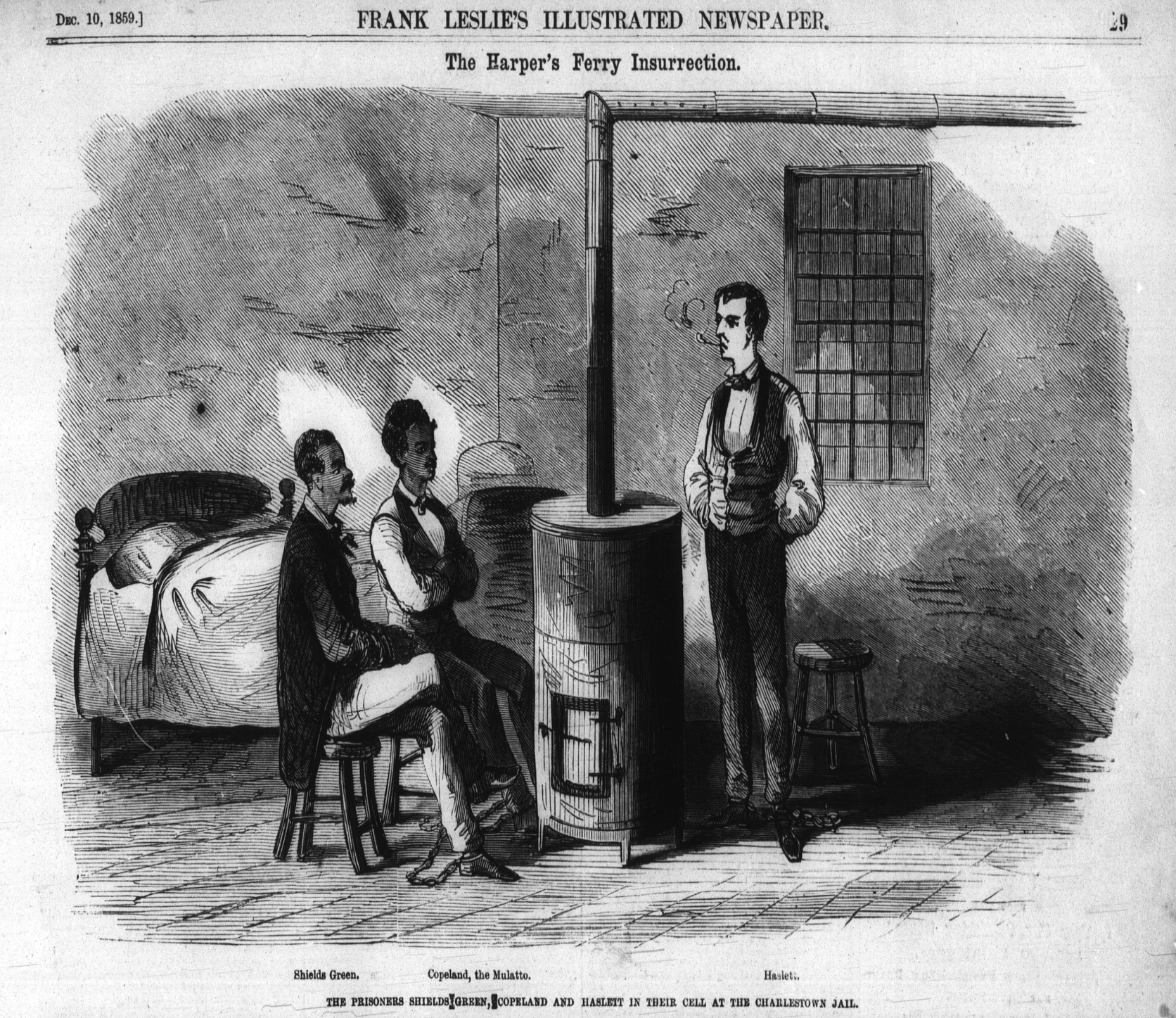
Shields Green, John Copeland, and Albert Hazlett in their cell in the Jefferson County jail

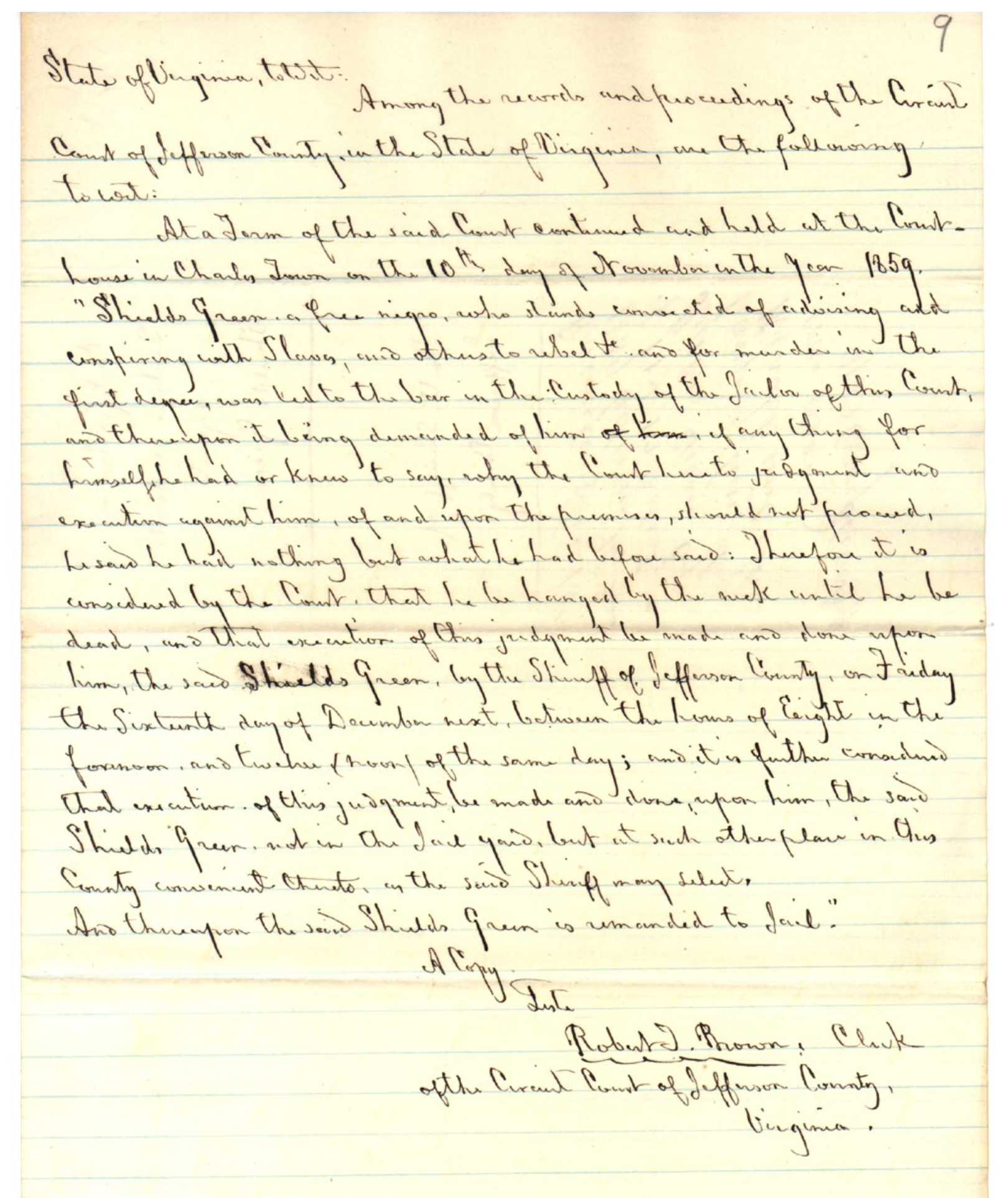
Death sentence of Shields Green, November 10, 1859

Green's trial preceded that of the other Black captive, Copeland, and began on November 3, that of Edwin Coppock having ended the day before. "Mr. Griswold appeared as his counsel, Judge Russell, of Boston, is also on his way here to take part in the defence of the prisoners."

Green's case was called first, and the prosecution's evidence was overwhelming. The chief witness against the defendant was the plantation master Lewis Washington, a great-nephew of George Washington, who had been kidnapped and held prisoner by Brown's men. Washington testified that Green—who was carrying a rifle, a pistol, and a butcher knife—had been placed in charge of guarding the white hostages. Washington also testified that Green had fired shots at the surrounding militia, but that was not his worst offense. Far more heinous in Washington's eyes, however, had been Green's "very impudent manner" in addressing his betters, a crime that the aristocratic plantation owner considered more threatening than violence. Unusual forborn in slavery, Green did have a self-confident bearing that led his friends to affectionately call him "Emperor."" Although he may have appeared impudent in the eyes of a slave master, the reality was, as Frederick Douglass put it, that Green's "courage and self-respect made him quite a dignified character." Lewis Washington, however, was unable to recognize dignity in a Black man, and he was especially offended that Green had presumed to give orders to the white hostages. Washington also called Green a coward. When a detachment of Colonel Lee's men, under the command of Lieutenant J.E.B. Stuart, made their final assault on Brown's position at the armory, Green evidently threw away his arms and tried to lose himself among the local slaves." Despite Washington's condescending characterization,

Green's pro bono attorney George Sennott "argued for the defence of Shields Green. His address was full of ingenuity. Every resource seemed to be invoked. I cannot tell you the number of 'points' he made, but they were very numerous and very sharp. The sensitiveness of the audience, too, was less evident than yesterday, and Mr. Sennott's manner, which was not so demonstrative as before, augmented their good humor. I think the Court was hardly prepared for so much acuteness as he showed."

In a startling and much-commented argument, Sennott cited the recent Dred Scott decision to get the charge of treason dropped. The spectators gasped, but he argued successfully that since Blacks, including Green, were not citizens of the United States according to that ruling, they could not commit treason. According to the relevant statute, only "free persons" could commit treason. The jury found him not guilty of that charge. Abolitionists, however, were concerned about this apparent endorsement of the Dred Scott decision.

He was thoroughly dressed down by prosecuting attorney Hunter:

[A]t times he rises to an eloquence that rings through the court-room, and moves listeners to approving outbursts that call for subjugation by sheriff and constable. In the case of the negro Green, allusion was made by the counsel for the defense to an attempt to introduce impertinent evidence respecting the advances of the prisoner toward a mulatto girl at the time of the midnight entrance into the plantations. Mr. Hunter pursued his answering argument quietly, until he reached this point, and then, lifting himself to his full height, and compressing his fine features to unwanted sternness (for he usually wears a smile), he turned upon the negro, and with a rapidity that certainly exhibited a wonderful acquaintance with the vocabulary of invective, hurled for a while incessant denunciation upon the guilty passion which he assumed to have inspired Shields Green to join the expedition. How the negro ever sat so stolid under it, I cannot understand; but the crowd that filled the hall blazed with fury, and clenched fists in agonies of virtuous indignaticn. I suppose that the consciousness of having offered endless similar impure examples never entered their minds at all. Mr. Hunter, however, gained new and blushing honors. It was his best display of the season, and far surpassed anything offered by other orators.

Green, like all criminal defendants in Virginia at the time, could not testify. He did not say a word during the trial, according to one source, but court records do not support this: in response to the same question John Brown was asked (see John Brown's last speech), if he had anything to say before sentencing, his reply was "nothing but what he had before said", whereas his cellmate John Copeland remained mute. (A different report has Green mute as well.) Steven Lubek has pointed out that Green obviously did not disclose that Brown and Douglass knew each other, as that would have been a bombshell and all over the papers. That is why Brown and Douglass met at such a remote location—an abandoned stone quarry, to which they were led by the Chambersburg conductor of the Underground Railroad. (After the raid, the Chambersburg newspaper, writing on Brown's many visits to that city, linked Douglass's visit with a meeting with Brown.)

The three Black defendants—Green, Copeland, and Leahy—all said that they knew nothing of Brown's plans until the Sunday morning meeting before the raid. In Green's case this was certainly false, since he had been present at the lengthy discussions between Douglass and Brown.

The comment of the correspondent for Frank Leslie's Illustrated Newspaper is: "the colored men do not seem to know what all the fuss is about; they keep close to the stove and read the Bible."

Green's trial ended November 5, and was followed by that of Copeland. The charge of treason was also dropped for Copeland. Both were convicted, along with John Brown and the others, of murder and inciting a slave insurrection. Green, Copeland, Cook, and Edwin Coppock were sentenced to death on November 10. According to Parker, pronouncing the death sentences "is the most painful duty I have ever been called on to perform". According to a reporter, "a large number of the spectators wept, as did the Judge".

On December 2, the morning of John Brown's execution, Green sent word to Brown that he was glad to have fought with him, and awaited his death willingly.

Coppock and Cook attempted to escape from the jail using a knife they got from Green, but he did not try to escape himself. There is no comment anywhere on how Green got a knife in jail.

== Green's execution ==
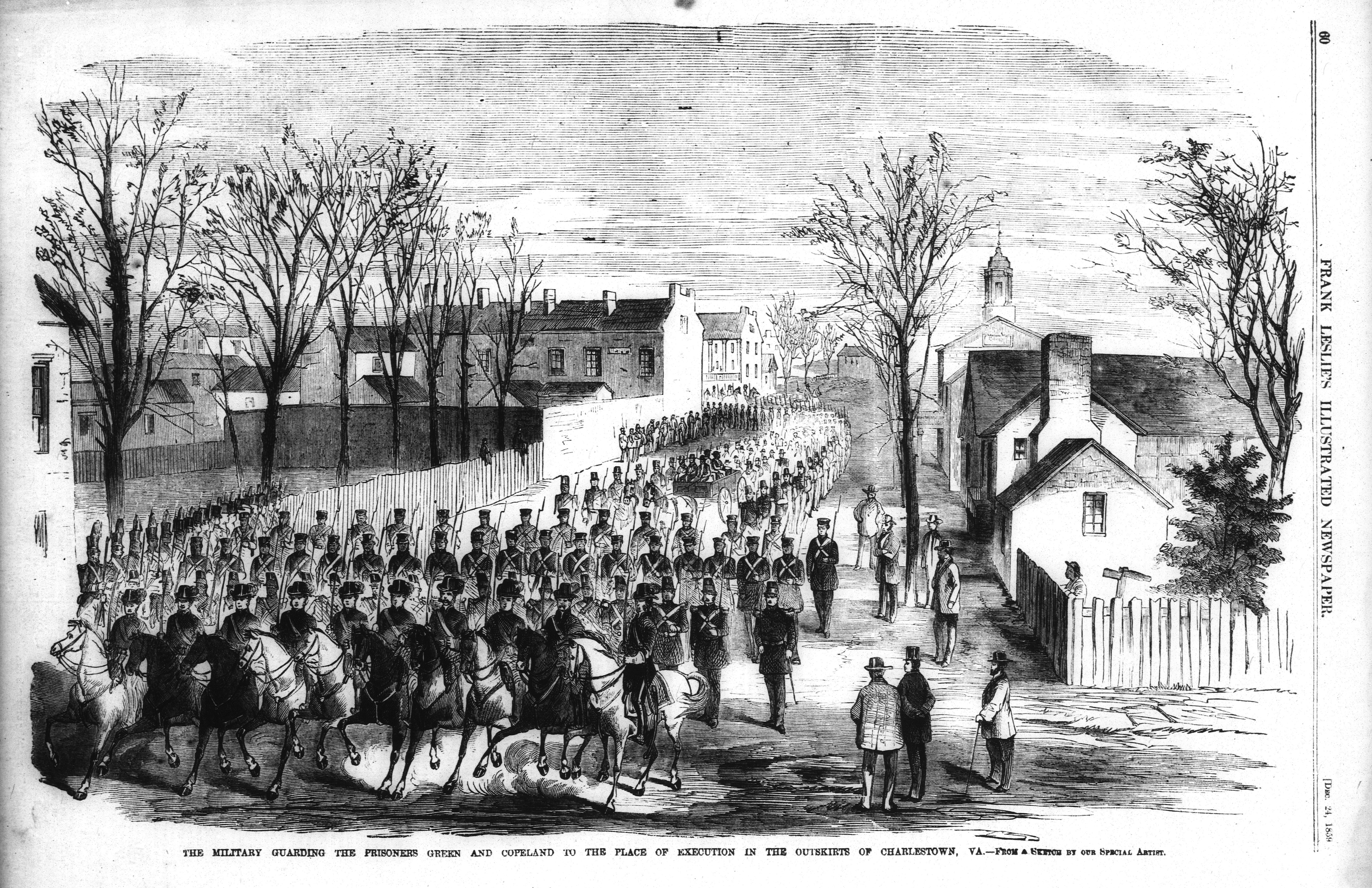
John Anthony Copeland Jr. and Shields Green, being taken in a wagon from the jail to the gallows.

Green and Copeland were hanged on Friday, December 16, two weeks after Brown. There were at least 1,600 spectators. "The bodies of the negroes, after being cut down, were placed in poplar coffins and carried back to the jail. They will be interred tomorrow on the spot where the gallows stand, though there is a party of medical students here from Winchester who will doubtless not allow them to remain there long."

After a burial which may have lasted no more than an hour, their corpses were dug up—the grave-robbing students carried guns, in part to keep away other medical students that also wanted the corpses. They were taken to the nearby Winchester Medical College for dissection by students. A letter from Black residents of Philadelphia to Virginia Governor Wise, requesting their bodies so as to bury them, had no effect. Professor James Monroe of Oberlin College, a friend of Copeland's family from Oberlin, Ohio, searched for Copeland's body, but found only Green's. He was unable to retrieve Copeland's body, as the medical students hid the corpse and threatened him with violence if he continued his quest. It did not occur to him to retrieve Green's body; no one wanted it, in Oberlin or anywhere else. This is the last news we have of it, on a dissecting table. At the time, unclaimed dead bodies were often used or disposed of this way. During the Civil War, Union troops burned down Winchester Medical College in retaliation for what happened to Brown and his men. It was never rebuilt.

In 1928, unidentifiable bones from bodies dissected at the Winchester Medical College were found in a pit under a building being torn down. There is no report on what was done with the bones found.

== Legacy and honors ==
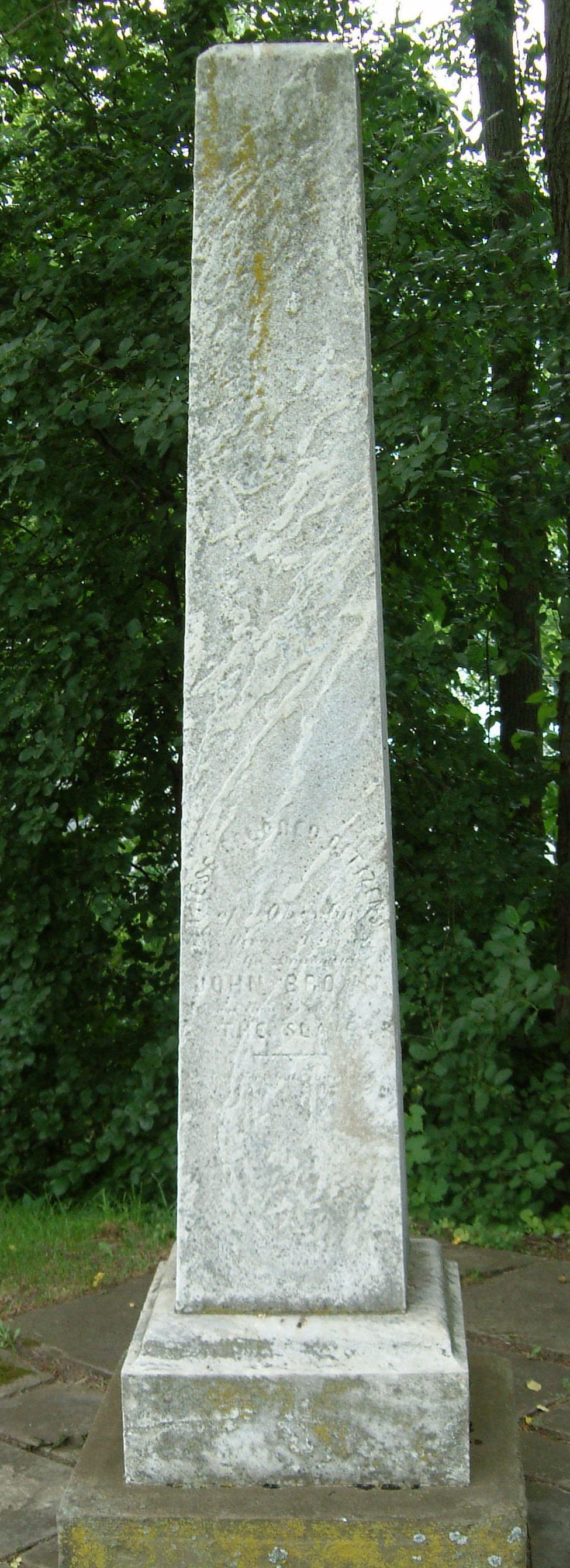
Monument honoring Copeland, Green, and Leary in Oberlin, Ohio.

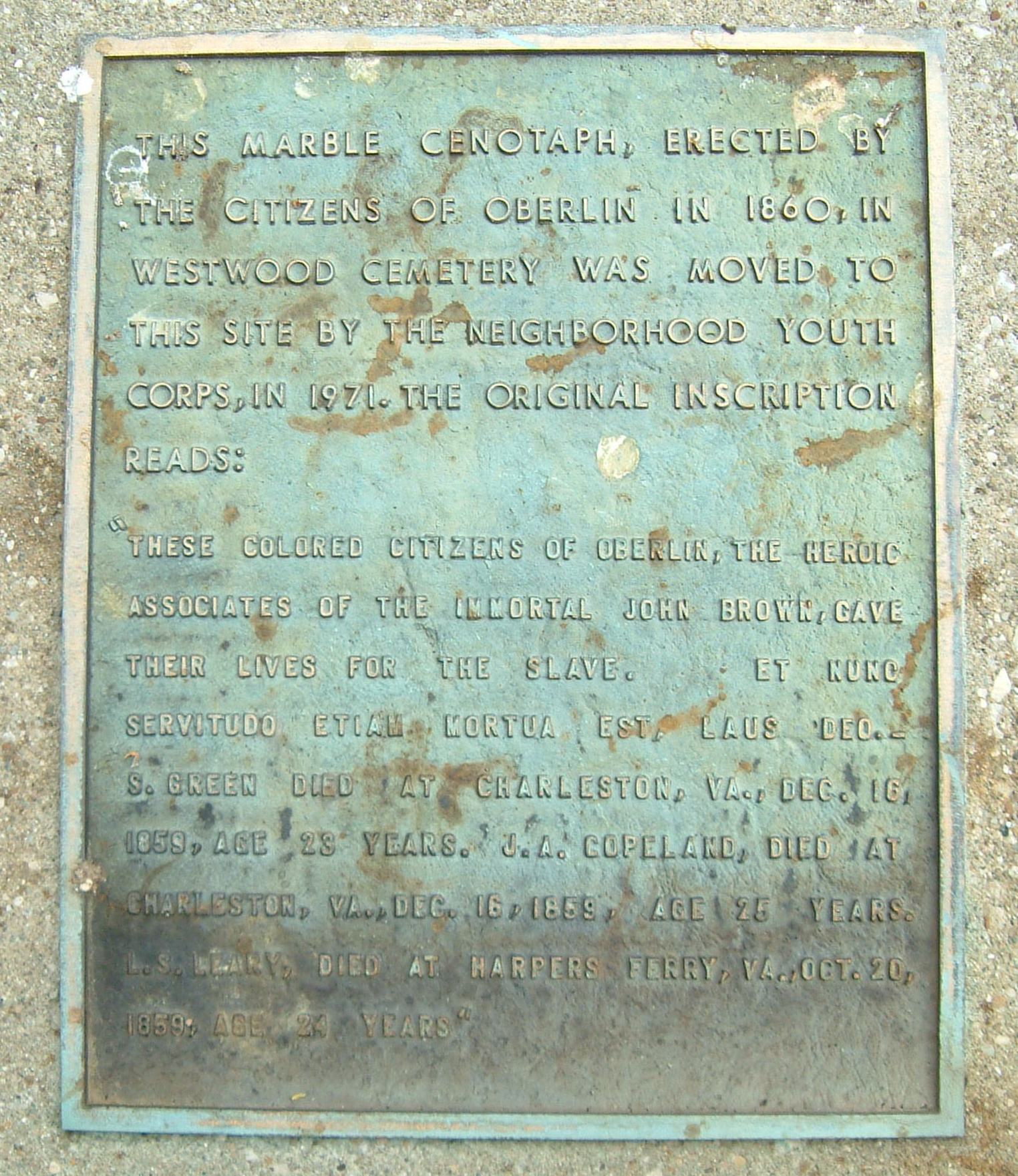
Plaque showing original inscription

- On December 25, 1859, a memorial service was held in Oberlin for Copeland, Green, and Lewis Sheridan Leary, who died during the raid.
- A cenotaph was erected in 1865 in Westwood Cemetery to honor the three "citizens of Oberlin." The monument was moved in 1971 to Martin Luther King Jr. Park on Vine Street in Oberlin. The inscription reads:

These colored citizens of Oberlin, the heroic associates of the immortal John Brown, gave their lives for the slave.
Et nunc servitudo etiam mortua est, laus deo [And now slavery is finally dead, thanks be to God].

S. Green died at Charleston, Va., Dec. 16, 1859, age 23 years.

J. A. Copeland died at Charleston, Va., Dec. 16, 1859, age 25 years.

L. S. Leary died at Harper's Ferry, Va., Oct. 20, 1859, age 24 years.

- The Green–Copeland American Legion Post 63 was founded in Charles Town, West Virginia in 1929. It joined with another Black post after the Second World War.
- "John Brown's Body Servant", a fictionalized version of his time with Frederick Douglass, was published in 1941.
- At the centennial in 1959, a columnist expressed frustration that no school or anything else had been named for either Green or Copeland.
- A 1983 play by Alf Pratt, When My Bees Swarm (words of Brown), dramatizes the Brown–Douglass–Green meeting in Chambersburg. It has never been produced.
- He was called "Rochester's first black martyr" by Shirley Clark Husted, in her Monroe County, New York, Civil War anthology, Sweet Gift of Freedom (1986).
- The Brown–Douglass–Green meeting is the subject of the play Ten Thousand Mornings by T. P. Bancroft. It was produced non-professionally in 1990.
- African-American storyteller David Anderson expanded the known facts of Green's life into a story, "Being of a Reckless Disposition" (1994).
- He Who Endures, by Bill Harris, is a one-act play in seven scenes about Green, Douglass, and Brown, that puts on the stage Douglass's Chambersburg meeting with Brown. Henry Highland Garnet is also a character. It was published in 1996.
- Shields Green and the Gospel of John Brown is a 1996 screenplay by Kevin Willmott and Mitch Brian which "tells the story of Green, an ex-slave and disciple of Frederick Douglass[,] who accompanied Brown to Harper's Ferry, where he died." In Shields Green, "there's a reluctant leader/hero. It's like The 70's in the sense that there's a kid—Shields Green, in this case—who is running from reality, and he ends up embracing the reality of race and assuming the mantle of leadership. I mean, at first Green only wants to get his family free from slavery, but then he grows into a person who believes that all slaves need to be free." It was purchased by Chris Columbus for 20th-Century Fox, but was not produced. Denzel Washington was offered the part of Shields, with Harrison Ford playing John Brown. Paul Newman considered the part of Brown, but withdrew "because of ideological differences with the late Rupert Murdoch" (part owner of Fox Entertainment Group, which was undertaking the project). The rights have reverted to the authors. A public reading was held in Lawrence, Kansas, in 2002.
- On August 19, 2001, the Jefferson County Black Historical Preservation City had a small memorial service for Green and Copeland, at the site of the former "Colored Cemetery" in Charles Town.
- The Brown–Douglass–Green meeting in Chambersburg also appears in a 2013 PBS miniseries, The Abolitionists.
- The study Five for Freedom. The African American Soldiers in John Brown's Army, by Eugene L. Meyer, was published in 2018.
- Dayo Okeniyi portrays Green in the 2020 film Emperor. In the film, Green does not have a speech defect, survives Harpers Ferry, and his son writes a book about him.
- Louis A. DeCaro's book The Untold Story of Shields Green was published by New York University Press in 2020.
- Quentin Plair portrays Green in the 2020 Showtime miniseries The Good Lord Bird.

== See also ==
- John Brown's raiders
