= Hawkinstown, Virginia =

Unincorporated community in Virginia, US

Coordinates: 38°46′21″N 78°36′47″W

Hawkinstown is an unincorporated community in Shenandoah County, in the U.S. state of Virginia.
