= James Monroe (Ohio politician) =

American politician (1821–1898)

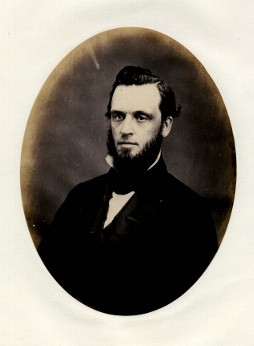

Member of the U.S. House of Representatives from Ohio
- In office March 4, 1871 – March 3, 1881
- Preceded by: Martin Welker
- Succeeded by: William McKinley
- Constituency: 14th district (1871–1873); 18th district (1873–1879); 17th district (1879–1881)

Personal details
- Born: July 18, 1821 Plainfield, Connecticut, U.S.
- Died: July 6, 1898 (aged 76) Oberlin, Ohio, U.S.
- Party: Republican
- Spouses: Elizabeth Maxwell; Julia Finney
- Children: 4
- Education: Oberlin College

James Monroe (July 18, 1821 – July 6, 1898) was an American politician who served five terms as a U.S. representative from Ohio from 1871 to 1881.

== Early life ==
Born in Plainfield, Connecticut, Monroe attended the common schools and Plainfield Academy. He was graduated from Oberlin College in 1846. He pursued a postgraduate course in theology and was a professor at Oberlin College from 1849 to 1862.

== Career ==
He served as a member of the Ohio House of Representatives in 1856–1859. He served in the Ohio Senate from 1860 to 1862, during which time he was chosen to serve as president pro tempore from 1861 and 1862.

In October 1862, he resigned his seat in the Senate to accept the position of United States Consul in Rio de Janeiro and served from 1863 to 1869. Following that, he served for several months in 1869 as Chargé d'Affaires ad interim to Brazil.

=== Congress ===
Monroe was elected as a Republican to the Forty-second and to the four succeeding Congresses (March 4, 1871 – March 3, 1881). He served as chairman of the Committee on Education and Labor (Forty-third Congress) and was not a candidate for renomination.

=== Later career ===
After his terms in the House of Representatives, he returned to Oberlin College as a professor from 1883 to 1896.

== Personal life ==
He was married twice, first to Elizabeth Maxwell (1825–1862), and later to Julia Finney (1837–1930). He had four children, including:

- Mary Katherine Monroe (1851–1891)
- Charles Edwin Monroe (1861–1947)

He died in Oberlin, Ohio, on July 6, 1898 and was interred in Westwood Cemetery.

=== Legacy ===
The house in which Monroe and his wife Julia lived when they returned to Oberlin from his consul appointment in Rio de Janeiro is currently preserved as part of the Oberlin Heritage Center. The current interior of the house presents decor and information from the 1860s, 1870s, and 1880s, and uses Monroe's commitments to education and the abolition of slavery to highlight important events in the history of the city of Oberlin.

== Writings ==
- Monroe, James (1897). Oberlin Thursday Lectures and Essays. Oberlin, Ohio: Edward J. Goodrich.

U.S. House of Representatives
Preceded by Martin Welker	United States Representative from Ohio's 14th congressional district March 4, 1871 – March 4, 1873	Succeeded by John Berry
Preceded by William H. Upson	United States Representative from Ohio's 18th congressional district March 4, 1873 – March 4, 1879	Succeeded by Jonathan T. Updegraff
Preceded by William McKinley	United States Representative from Ohio's 17th congressional district March 4, 1879 – March 4, 1881	Succeeded by William McKinley
Ohio House of Representatives
Preceded by Walter F. Herrick	Representative from Lorain County; January 7, 1856 – January 1, 1860	Succeeded by Walter F. Herrick; John M. Vincent
Ohio Senate
Preceded by Herman Canfield	Senator from 27th District; January 2, 1860 – January 3, 1864	Succeeded by Samuel Humphreyville
