= Aaron Dwight Stevens =

American abolitionist (1831-1860)

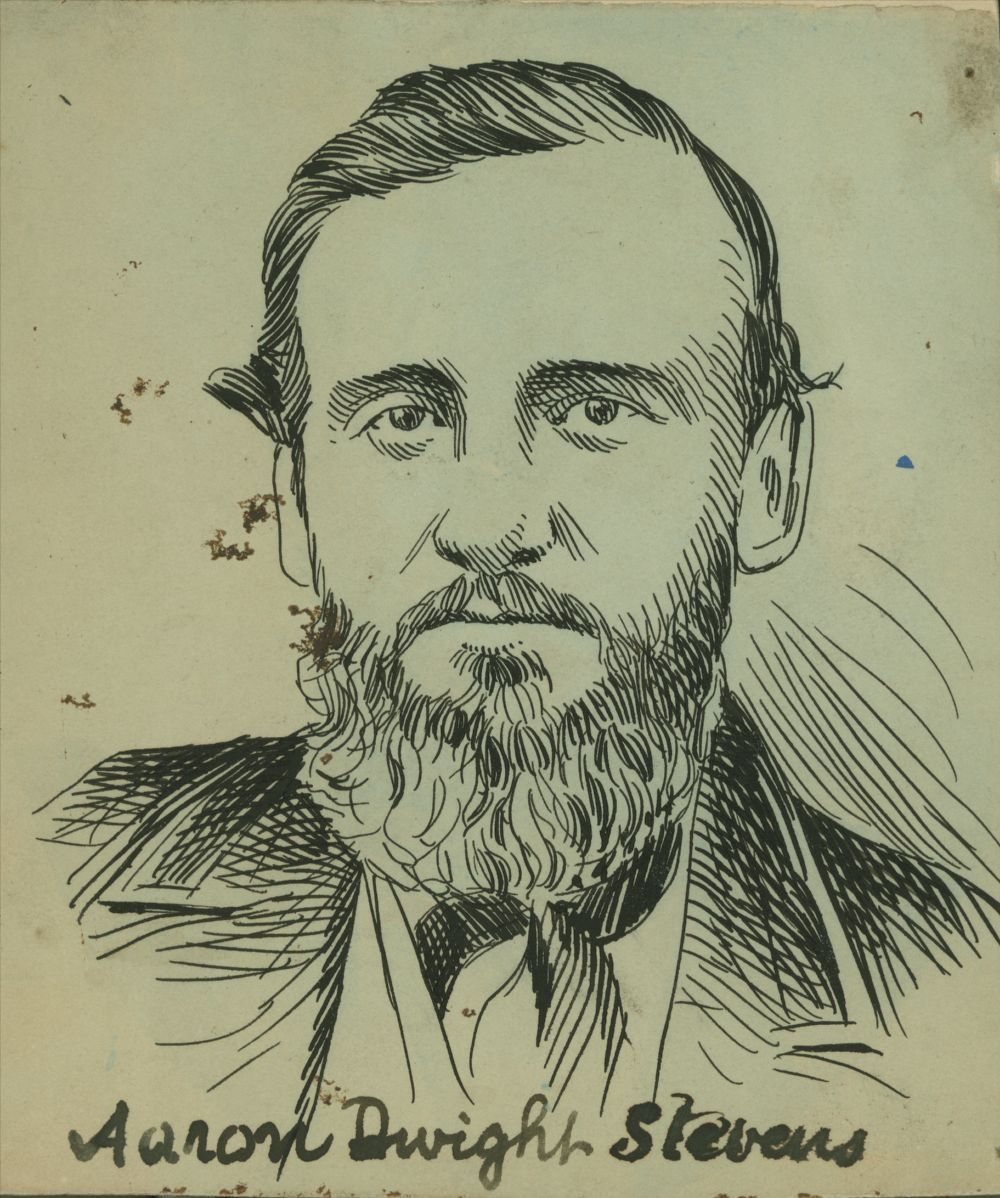
- Born: March 15, 1831; Lisbon, New London County, Connecticut, U.S.
- Died: March 16, 1860 (aged 29); Charles Town, Virginia, U.S.
- Cause of death: Execution by hanging
- Occupation: Chief military aide to John Brown
- Known for: Abolitionist

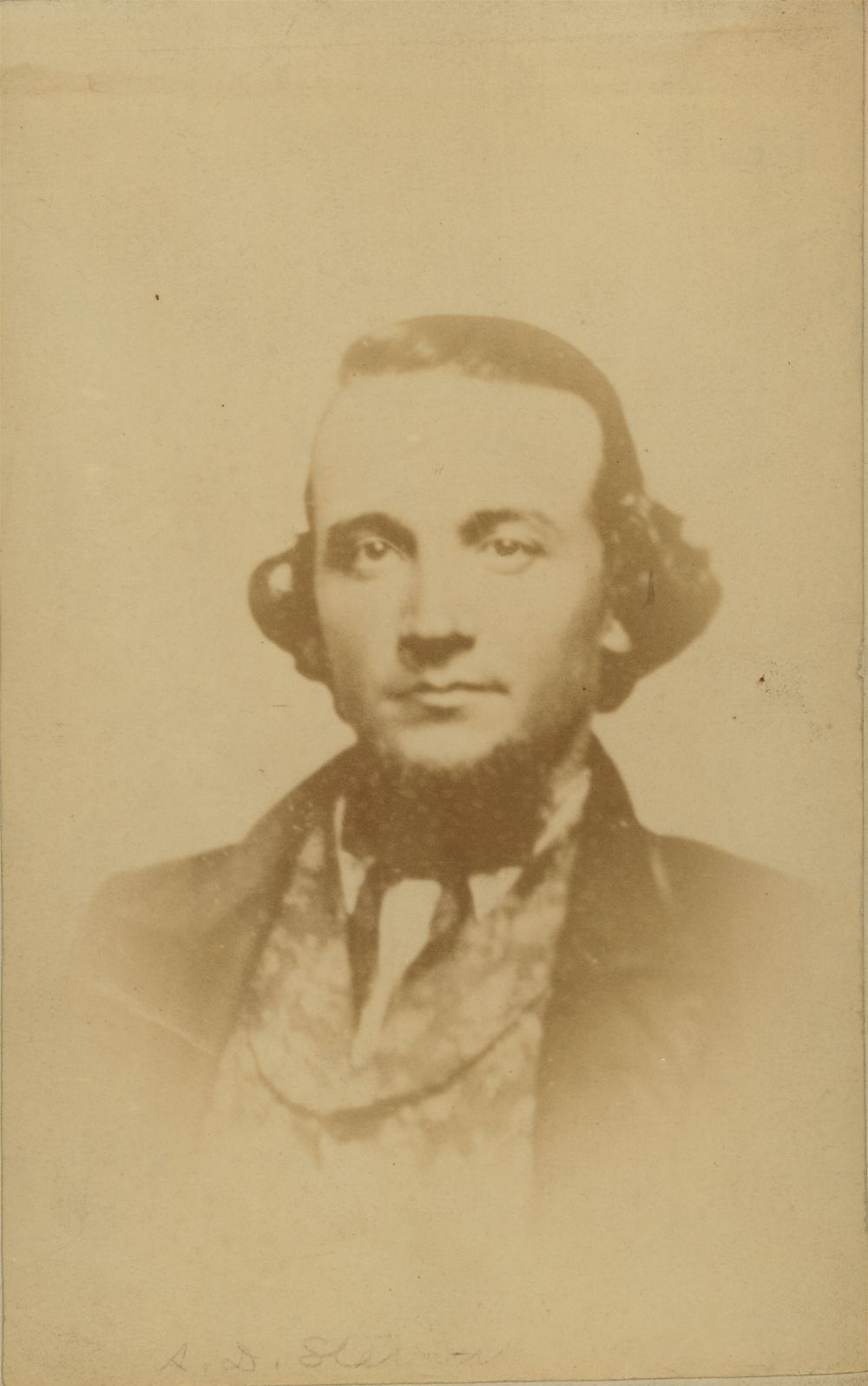
Young Aaron Dwight Stevens

Aaron Dwight Stevens (sometimes misspelled Stephens) (March 15, 1831 – March 16, 1860) was an American abolitionist. The only one of John Brown's raiders with military experience, he was the chief military aide to Brown during his failed raid on the federal arsenal in Harpers Ferry, Virginia. For his role in the raid, Stevens was executed on March 16, 1860. He was 29.

== Life ==
Stevens was born in Lisbon, Connecticut, March 15, 1831. He moved with his family to Norwich, Connecticut, at an early age, when his father became choir director of the First Congregational Church. Stevens ran away from home in 1847, at the age of 16, and enlisted in Cushing's Massachusetts regiment of volunteers, in which he served in Mexico during the Mexican–American War. Later, he enlisted in Company F of the First United States Dragoons, and was tried for "mutiny, engaging in a drunken riot, and assaulting Major George A.H. Blake" of the 1st U.S. Dragoons at Taos, New Mexico Territory, on March 8, 1855. Stevens was not drunk during the riot but was challenged by drunken Major Blake. According to testimony offered at a court of inquiry, the assault on Major Blake was precipitated by Stevens's outrage over Blake's continuous abuse of enlisted soldiers. Stevens and three other mutineers were sentenced to death, but these sentences were commuted by President Franklin Pierce with the support of the Secretary of War, ironically then Jefferson Davis, to imprisonment for three years at hard labor at Fort Leavenworth, from which he escaped and joined the Free State forces. He became colonel in the 2nd Kansas Militia, under the name of Charles Whipple. He met Brown on August 7, 1856, at the Nebraska state line, when Lane's Army of the North marched into "Bleeding Kansas." He later became one of Brown's bravest and most devoted followers.

While serving under Brown in Kansas, Stevens shot and killed a slave owner named David Cruise, in self-defense, while attempting to free a female slave. According to Stevens's own account, while entering the home, Stevens saw Cruise reaching for a weapon and shot him dead. In subsequent years, Stevens freely admitted the killing but disliked talking about it. "You might call it a case of self-defense," he recounted, "or you might say that I had no business in there, and that the old man was right."

== Raid on Harpers Ferry ==
In 1859, Stevens participated in John Brown's raid on Harpers Ferry, Virginia. According to the memoir of fellow raider Osborne Anderson, Stevens drilled Brown's men in military tactics and held "the active military position in the organization second to Captain Brown." He was eventually trapped with Brown and several other raiders in the Arsenal engine house, during which time he argued heatedly with Brown over how to proceed tactically. Stevens suggested that the raiders flee. Brown, however, overruled Stevens and insisted that they remain inside the engine house waiting for the slaves to revolt and come to him "like bees to honey". When Brown sent him outside along with his son Watson Brown to negotiate under a flag of truce, Stevens was shot in the face and chest area and was captured by militia members. At first his captors could locate no pulse or heartbeat, yet Stevens remained awake and lucid. According to an eyewitness, when asked at this time if there was "anyone dear to him," Stevens responded "All those who are good are dear to me."

== Trial and execution ==
George H. Hoyt, Brown's counsel, in a letter to J. W. Le Barnes, October 31, 1859, thus recorded his first impression of Stevens:

Stevens is in the same cell with Brown. I have frequent talks with him. He's in a most pitiable condition physically, his wounds being of the most painful and dangerous character. He has now four balls in his body, two of these being about the head and neck. He bears his sufferings with grim and silent fortitude, never complaining and absolutely without hope. He is a splendid looking young fellow. Such black and penetrating eyes! Such an expansive brow! Such a grand chest and limbs! He was the best, and in fact the only man Brown had who was a good soldier besides being reliable otherwise.

His father traveled from Connecticut to Charles Town to visit him.

During his imprisonment, he never wavered from his conviction that the Harpers Ferry raid was just. In a letter to a friend from the Charles Town jail, he wrote:

I do not feel guilty in the least, for I know, if I know, anything, that there was no evil intention in my heart. I thought I should be able to do more good for the world in this way than I could do in any other. I may have erred as to the best way, but I think every thing will turn out for the best in the end.

I do not expect to be tried until next Spring, when I expect I shall be hung, as I think all the rest will. Slavery demands that we should hang for its protection, and we will meet it willingly, knowing that God is Just, and is over all.

There seems to be no mercy for those who are willing to help those who have none to help them.

My heart feels like bleeding to think how many thousands are worse off in this land than I am now. Oh, that I could see this country free, I would give a thousand lives if I had them to give.

At one point his trial had been "removed" to Federal Court in Staunton, Virginia, "in order that witnesses of other States be summoned." However, his trial took place in Charles Town, in a special session of the Circuit Court which the Virginia Legislature authorized. For his part in Brown's raid, Stevens was convicted of conspiring with slaves to revolt, and was executed on March 16, 1860, in Charles Town, West Virginia, one day after his 29th birthday. His last words to Brown were "Captain Brown, I'll see you in a better land." Albert Hazlett was also executed on that day.

His body was sent immediately to Perth Amboy, New Jersey, to the house of Marcus and Rebecca B. Spring, the latter of whom had nursed him in the Charles Town jail. A funeral was held there. He was buried at the Eagleswood Cemetery, at the nearby Eagleswood Military Academy, an abolitionist school directed at one time by Theodore Weld, next to the graves of James G. Birney and her father Arnold Buffum. In 1898 he was reinterred, with 9 others, next to John Brown's grave, at the John Brown Farm, in North Elba, New York.

== See also ==
- John Brown's raiders
- Silas Soule supported and was a proponent of John Brown's movement.
