= Jefferson County, Virginia =

Jefferson County, Virginia has referred to two former counties of the Commonwealth of Virginia. Both were named for Thomas Jefferson, one of Virginia's most prominent statesmen, and both ceased to exist when portions of Virginia were partitioned to form new states under Article IV, Section 3, Clause 1 of the United States Constitution:

- Jefferson County, Kentucky, created in 1780, became a part of Kentucky when that state was admitted to the Union in 1792.
- Jefferson County, West Virginia, created in 1801, became part of West Virginia when that state was admitted to the Union in 1863.

== See also ==
- Former counties, cities, and towns of Virginia
