= Trial of John Brown =

Criminal trial held at Charles Town

Virginia v. John Brown
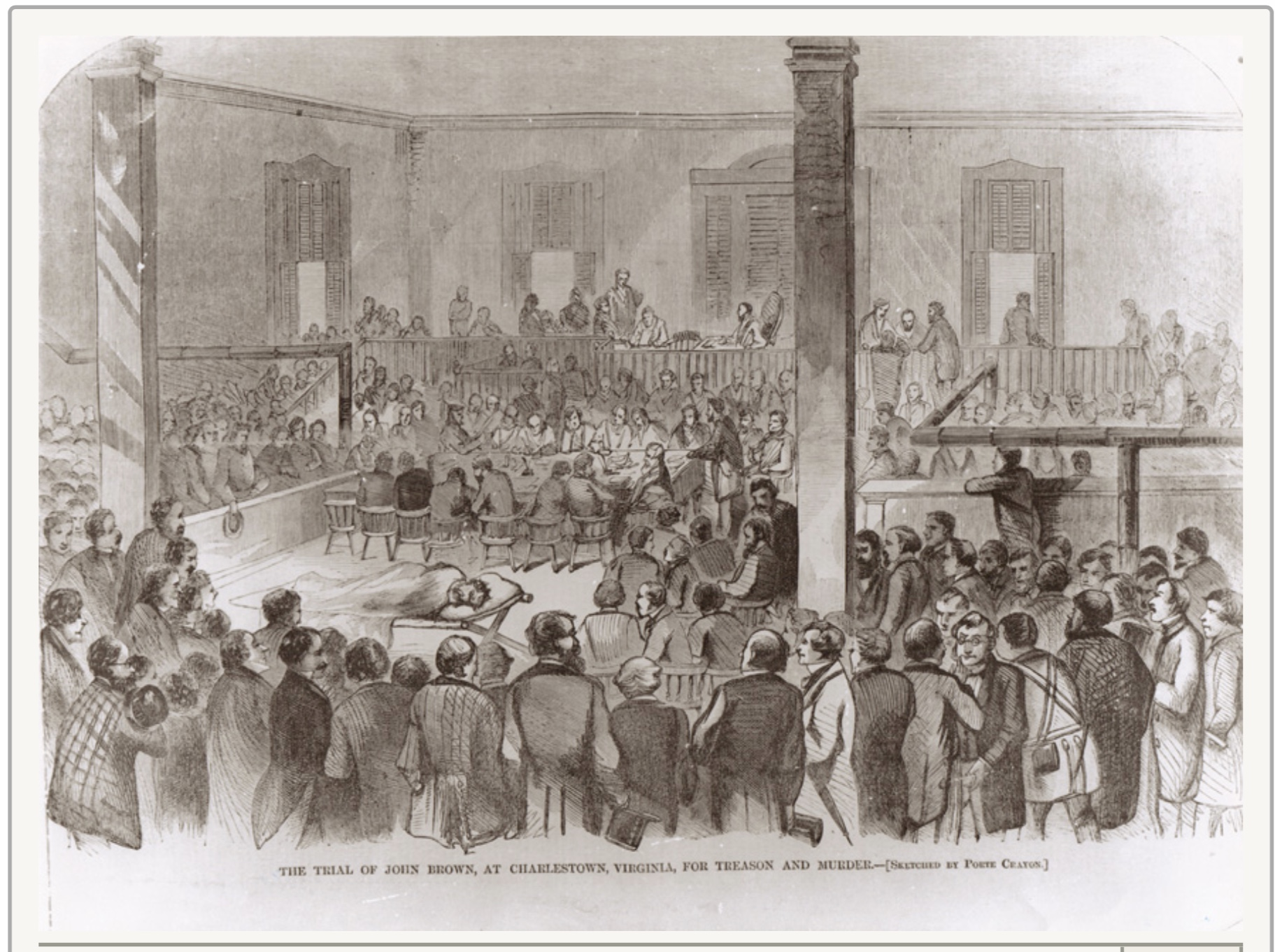
- 1859 illustration of the trial by David Hunter Strother
- Decided: October 31, 1859
- Verdict: Guilty of all charges; sentenced to death by hanging
- Charge: "Conspiring with negroes to produce insurrection"; Treason against the Commonwealth of Virginia; Murder
- Prosecution: Andrew Hunter
- Defence: George H. Hoyt; Samuel Chilton; Hiram Griswold

Court membership
- Judge sitting: Richard Parker

Virginia v. John Brown was a criminal trial held in Charles Town, Virginia, United States, in October 1859. The abolitionist activist John Brown was quickly prosecuted for treason against the Commonwealth of Virginia, murder, and inciting a slave insurrection, all part of his raid on the United States federal arsenal at Harpers Ferry, Virginia. (Since 1863, both Charles Town and Harpers Ferry are located in West Virginia.) He was found guilty of all charges, sentenced to death, and was executed by hanging on December 2.

It was in many respects a most remarkable trial. Capital cases have been exceedingly few in the history of our country where trial and conviction have followed so quickly upon the commission of the offense. Within a fortnight from the time when Brown had struck what he believed to be a righteous blow against what he felt to be the greatest sin of the age he was a condemned felon, with only thirty days between his life and the hangman's noose.

During most of the trial Brown lay on a pallet, unable to stand.

== Background ==
On October 16, 1859, Brown led (counting himself) 22 armed men, 5 black and 17 white, to Harpers Ferry, an important railroad, river, and canal junction. His goal was to seize the federal arsenal and then, using the captured arms, lead a slave insurrection in the South. Brown and his men engaged in a two-day standoff with local militia and federal troops, in which ten of his men were shot or killed, five were captured, and five escaped. Of Brown's three sons who participated, two, Oliver and Watson, were killed during the fight, except that Watson survived in agony until the next day. Owen escaped and later fought in the Union Army.

== Reporting on the trial ==
Thanks to the recently invented telegraph, Brown's trial was the first to be reported nationally. In attendance were reporters from the New York Herald and The Daily Exchange, both of whom had been in Harpers Ferry since October 18; reports on the trial, including Brown's remarks, differ in details, showing the work of more than one hand. The coverage was so intense that reporters could dedicate whole paragraphs to the weather, and the visit of Brown's wife, the night before his execution, was the subject of lengthy articles.

The stories in the New York Daily Tribune were published unsigned, as the reporter, Edward Howard House, was in Charles Town in disguise, under a false name, with credentials from a Boston pro-slavery paper. He begged a visitor who knew him, Edward A. Brackett, a sketch artist from Frank Leslie's Illustrated Newspaper, not to say his real name aloud. Some of his reports, which could not be mailed safely from Charles Town, were transmitted by wrapping them around the legs of this gentleman, which were then hidden from view by his trousers.

A second artist from Frank Leslie's Illustrated Newspaper was also in attendance, and Harper's Weekly employed a local artist and nephew of prosecuting attorney Andrew Hunter, Porte Crayon (David Hunter Strother); one of his drawings is in the Gallery, below. Leslie informed his readers that "one of our imitators" was publishing bogus pictures. He described how his paper had engravers and artists standing by in a New York hotel, and once a sketch had arrived from Charles Town, 16 artists worked simultaneously at transforming it (split into 16 segments) into an illustration ready to be printed. The illustrations were so widely distributed that Yale Literary Magazine made fun of them, publishing the drawings of "our own artist on the spot" of "Governor Wise's shoes", "John Brown's watch", and the like.

== Significance of the trial ==
Considering its aftermath, it was arguably the most important criminal trial in the history of the country, for it was closely related to the war that quickly followed. According to historian Karen Whitman, "The conduct of John Brown during his incarceration and trial was so strong and unwavering that slavery went on trial rather than slavery's captive."

According to Brian McGinty, the "Brown of history" was thus born in his trial. Had Brown died before his trial, he would have been "condemned as a madman and relegated to a footnote of history". Robert McGlone added that "the trial did magnify and exalt his image. But Brown's own efforts to fashion his ultimate public persona began long before the raid and culminated only in the weeks that followed his dramatic speech at his sentencing." After his arrest, Brown engaged in extensive correspondence. After the conviction and sentencing, the judge permitted him to have visitors, and in his final month alive – Virginia law required that a month elapse between sentencing and execution – he gave interviews to reporters or anyone else who wanted to talk to him. All of this was facilitated by the "just and humane" jailor of Jefferson County, Captain John Avis, who "does all for his prisoners that his duty allows him to", and had a "sincere respect" for Brown. His "humane treatment of Brown called forth the most severe criticisms from the Virginians." Brown's last meal, and the last time he saw his wife, was with the jailer's family, in their apartment at the jail.

== The trial ==
=== Jurisdiction ===
This was the first criminal case in the United States where there was a question of whether federal courts or state courts had jurisdiction.

The Secretary of War, after a lengthy meeting with President Buchanan, telegraphed Lee that the United States Attorney for the District of Columbia, Robert Ould, was being sent to take charge of the prisoners and bring them to justice. However, Governor Wise quickly appeared in person.

President Buchanan was indifferent to where Brown and his men were tried; Ould, in his brief report, did not call for federal prosecutions, as the only relevant crimes were those few that took place within the Armory. "Virginia Governor Henry Wise, on the other hand, was 'adamant' that the insurgents pay for their crimes through his state's local judicial system," "claiming" the prisoners "to be dealt with according to the laws of Virginia". As he put it, after claiming that he remained at Harper's Ferry to prevent the suspects from being lynched, he "had made up his mind fully, and after determining that the prisoners should be tried in Virginia, he would not have obeyed an order to the contrary from the President of the United States."

In short, Brown and his men did not face federal charges. There were no federal court facilities nearby, and transporting the accused to a federal courthouse in the state capital of Richmond or Washington D.C. – the nearest federal courthouse was in Staunton, Virginia, which was briefly mentioned in this regard – and maintaining them there would have been difficult and expensive. Because of Senator Mason's resolution setting up a "select committee" to investigate the events at Harpers Ferry, there was no need of a federal venue in order to summon witnesses from other states. Murder was not a federal crime, and a federal indictment for treason or fomenting slave insurrection would have caused a political crisis (because so many abolitionists would have denounced it). Under Virginia law, fomenting a slave insurrection was clearly and unequivocally a crime. And the defendants could be tried where they were, in Charles Town.

The trial, then, took place in the county courthouse in Charles Town, not to be confused with today's capital, Charleston, West Virginia. Charles Town is the county seat of Jefferson County, about 7 miles (11 km) west of Harpers Ferry. The judge was Richard Parker, of Winchester.

=== Military presence in Harpers Ferry ===
Between Brown's arrest and his execution, Charles Town was filled with armed forces, both federal and state (militia). "The Governor [kept] the state troops constantly on guard. so that from the time Brown and his men were put in jail until after his execution, Charlestown [sic] had much the appearance of a military camp." The state was spending almost a thousand dollars a day (equivalent to $35,833 in 2025) on military guards and other items, and after the episode was over the Virginia legislature appropriated $100,000 (equivalent to $3,583,333 in 2025) to cover these expenditures.

Charles Town was described thus by a reporter there at the time:

The village, turn where you will, presents every appearance of a besieged town, what with cannon in the streets, troops marching and parading, sentries pacing to and fro, orderlies hurrying hither and thither, public buildings, offices, churches, and private houses turned into barracks, and around them all the cooking, cleaning of accoutrements, and the thousand other accessories of soldiers' quarters.

Coordinating local security activities, including keeping non-residents without legitimate business in the city away, was Andrew Hunter, personal attorney of Governor Wise, and the most distinguished attorney in Jefferson County. The main goal was to prevent an armed rescue of Brown, despite the fact that Brown said repeatedly that he did not want to be rescued. According to Hunter in his memoirs, another reason for the heavy military presence, for which Wise was criticized, is that both Wise and Hunter were concerned that a larger battle could take place, beginning the Civil War in Virginia in 1859:

[B]efore the trials were over, both he and I became convinced that the Brown raid was the beginning of a great conflict between the North and the South on the subject of slavery. This furnishes an additional explanation of the reason Gov. Wise assembled so large a military volunteer force at Charlestown and at the neighboring points. It was not alone for the protection of the jail and the repelling of parties who were known to be organizing with the view of rescuing Brown and the prisoners, but it was for the purpose of preparing for coming events.

Even Hunter's office was put to military use:

It is a novel sight, however, to observe the lawyers' offices, as well as the public buildings, turned into barracks and guard-rooms, and the floors covered with straw for bedding, knapsacks, baggage, &c., of the soldiers. The outer office of Andrew Hunter, Esq., adjoining the courthouse, is used as a kitchen for certain companies. A huge cooking stove, rounds of beef resting against well-filled shelves of law books, cooks actively engaged &c., imparted to his office entrance quite a singular appearance.

=== Grand jury ===
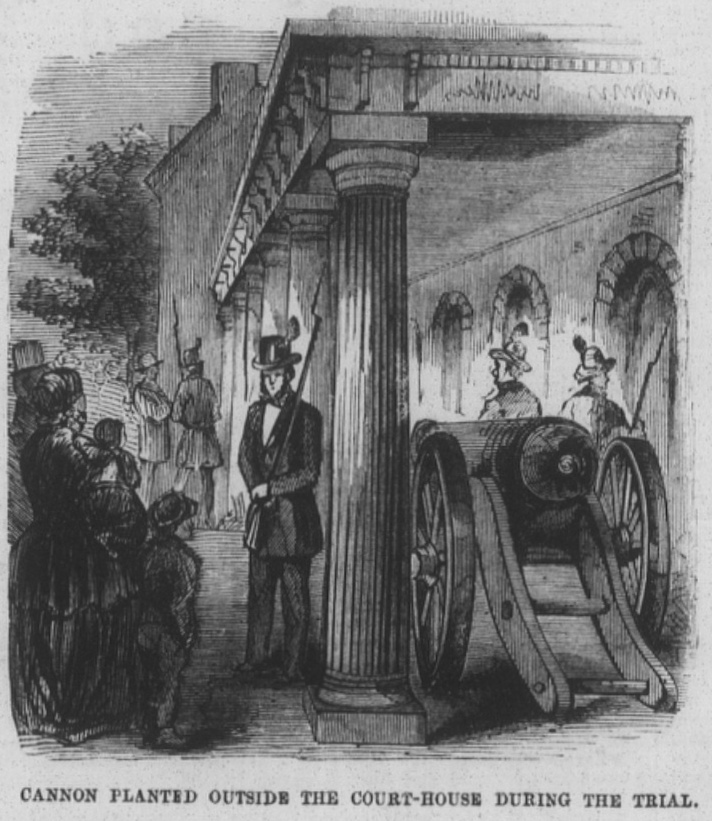
Cannon outside the Charles Town courthouse during John Brown's trial

Brown faced a grand jury on Tuesday, October 25, 1859, just eight days after his capture in the armory. Brown was brought into court "accompanied by a body of armed men. Cannon were stationed in front of the court house [see illustration], and an armed guard were [sic] patrolling round the jail."

The grand jury was also considering the other prisoners to be tried with Brown: Aaron Stephens, Edwin Coppie, Shields Green, and John Copeland. The courtroom was so crowded with spectators, all white since Blacks were not admitted, that there was not even standing room. At 5 PM the grand jury reported they had not yet finished questioning of witnesses, and the hearing was adjourned until the next day. On October 26 the grand jury returned a true bill of indictment against Brown and the other defendants, charging them with:

- Conspiring with slaves to produce insurrection,
- Treason against the Commonwealth of Virginia, and
- Murder.

Also on the 26th, M. Johnson, the United States Marshall from Cleveland, Ohio, arrived and identified Copeland as a fugitive from justice in Ohio.

=== Counsel ===
The next question was what legal counsel Brown was to have. The Court assigned two "Virginians and pro-slavery men", John Faulkner and Lawson Botts, as counsel for him and the other accused. Brown did not accept them; he told the judge that he had sent for counsel, "who have not had time to reach here".

I did not ask for any quarter at the time I was taken. I did not ask to have my life spared. The Governor of the State of Virginia tendered me his assurance that I should have a fair trial, but under no circumstances whatever will I be able to attend to a trial. If you seek my blood, you can have it at any moment without the mockery of a trial. I have had no counsel. I have not been able to advise with any one. I know nothing about the feelings of my fellow-prisoners, and am utterly unable to attend in any way to my own defence. My memory don't serve me. My health is insufficient although improving. There are mitigating circumstances, if a fair trial is to be allowed us, that I would urge in our favor, but if we are to be forced, with the mere form of a trial[,] to execution, you might spare yourselves that trouble. I am ready for my fate. I do not ask a trial. I beg for no mockery of a trial – so insult nothing but that which conscience gives or cowardice would drive you to practice. I ask to be excused from the mockery of a trial. I do not know what the design of this examination is[.] I do not know what is to be the benefit of it to the Commonwealth? I have now little to ask other than that I be not foolishly insulted[,] as the cowardly barbarous insult, those who fall into their power.

Brown asked for "a delay of two or three days" for his counsel to arrive. The judge turned down Brown's request: "the expectation of other counsel...did not constitute a sufficient cause for delay, as there was no certainty about their coming. ...The brief period remaining before the close of the term of the Court rendered it necessary to proceed as expeditiously as practicable, and to be cautious about granting delays."

Brown asked for "a very short delay" so that he could recover his hearing:

I do not intend to detain the court, but barely wish to say, as I have been promised a fair trial, that I am not now In circumstances that enable me to attend a trial, owing to the state of my health. I have a severe wound in the back, or rather in one kidney, which enfeebles me very much. But I am doing well, and I only ask for a very short delay of my trial, and I think that I may be able to listen to it; and I merely ask this that, as the saying is, "the devil may have his dues," no more. I wish to say further that my hearing is impaired and rendered indistinct in consequence of wounds I have about my head. I cannot hear distinctly at all; I could not hear what the Court has said this morning. I would be glad to hear what is said on my trial, and I am now doing better than I could expect to be under the circumstances. A very short delay would be all I would ask. I do not presume to ask more than a very short delay, so that I may in some degree recover, and be able at least to listen to my trial, and hear what questions are asked of the citizens, and what their answers are. If that could be allowed me, I should be very much obliged.

Prosecuting attorney Hunter said that delay would be dangerous; there was "exceeding pressure on the resources of the community". He asked that Brown's body be examined by a doctor, who did not find that Brown's health required delay.

The judge's refusal to postpone the trial even one day to allow Brown's counsel to arrive, or when it did arrive, to allow it to read the indictment and the testimony given so far (see below), and that Brown was being tried when he was too wounded to stand, much less "attend to his own defense", or follow what was being said, contributed to Brown's transformation into a martyr.

The remainder of October 26 was used to choose jurors. Also on the 26th, abolitionist Lydia Maria Child sent Wise a letter to deliver to Brown, and asked to be permitted to nurse him. Wise responded that she was free to go to Charles Town, that he had forwarded her letter there, but only the court could allow her access. Child's letter did reach Brown, who replied that he was recovering and did not need nursing. (In fact he didn't want nursing; it felt unmanly and made him uncomfortable.) He suggested instead that she raise funds for the support of his wife and the wives and children of his dead sons. Child sold her piano to raise funds for Brown's family. After publishing it in newspapers, where it was widely read, she also published in book form, to raise money, her correspondence with and relating to Brown. It sold over 300,000 copies, and contributed to the sanctification of Brown.

=== The trial proper ===
On Thursday, October 27, the trial proper began. Brown stated that he did not wish to use an insanity defense, as had been proposed by relatives and friends. A court-appointed lawyer said that a Virginia court could only try Brown for acts committed in Virginia, not in Maryland or on federal property (the arsenal). State counsel denied this was relevant.

Brown, having received by telegraph news from a lawyer in Ohio, asked for a delay of one day; this was denied. The state attorney said that Brown's real motive was "to give to his friends the time and opportunity to organize a rescue."

On Friday, October 28, George Henry Hoyt, a young but prominent Boston lawyer, arrived as counsel. One report says that Hoyt was a volunteer, but another that Hoyt was hired to defend Brown by John W. Le Barnes, one of the abolitionists who had given money to Brown in the past.

On that day Brown was described as "walking feebly" from the jail to the courthouse, where he lay down on the cot.

==== Prosecution ====
The prosecuting attorney for Jefferson County was Charles R. Harding, "whose daily occupations [drinking] are not of the nature to fit for the management of an important case". He was not on the same level as the defense attorneys. He agreed, unhappily, to be replaced for these cases, as Wise wanted, by Wise's personal attorney, Andrew Hunter. A Northern newspaper described Hunter as a "furious advocate of slavery".

The prosecuting attorney, then, was Hunter, whose office was in Charles Town, despite the fact that in writing he referred to himself as the Assistant Prosecuting Attorney. He wrote the indictment.

The central prosecution witness in the trial was Colonel Lewis Washington, great-grandnephew of George Washington, who had been kidnapped out of his home, Beall-Air, and held hostage near the Federal Armory. His slaves were militarily "impressed" (conscripted) by Brown, but they took no active part in the insurrection, he said. Other local witnesses testified to the seizure of the federal armory, the appearance of Virginia militia groups, and shootings on the railroad bridge. Other evidence described the U.S. Marines' raid on the fire engine house where Brown and his men were barricaded. U.S. Army Colonel Robert E. Lee and cavalry officer J. E. B. Stuart led the Marine raid, and it freed the hostages and ended the standoff. Lee did not appear at the trial to testify, but instead filed an affidavit to the court with his account of the Marines' raid.

The manuscript evidence was of particular interest to the judge and jury. Many documents were found on the Maryland farm rented by John Brown under the alias Isaac Smith. These included hundreds of undistributed copies of a previously unknown Provisional Constitution for an anti-slavery government. These documents clinched the treason and pre-meditated murder charges against Brown.

The prosecution concluded its examination of witnesses. The defense called witnesses, but they did not appear as subpoenas had not been served on them. Mr. Hoyt said that other counsel for Brown would arrive that evening. Both court-appointed attorneys then resigned, and the trial was adjourned until the next day.

==== Defense ====
The trial resumed on Saturday, October 29. A lawyer, Samuel Chilton, arrived from Washington, and asked for a few hours to read the indictment and the testimony so far given; this was denied. The defense called six witnesses.

The defense claimed that the Harpers Ferry Federal Armory was not on Virginia property, but since the murdered townspeople had died in the streets outside the perimeter of the Federal facility, this carried little weight with the jury. John Brown's lack of official citizenship in Virginia was presented as a defense against treason against the State. Judge Parker dispatched this claim by reference to "rights and responsibilities" and the overlapping citizenship requirements between the Federal union and the various states. John Brown, an American citizen, could be found guilty of treason against Virginia on the basis of his temporary residence there during the days of the insurrection.

Three other substantive defense tactics failed. One claimed that since the insurrection was aimed at the U.S. government it could not be proved treason against Virginia. Since Brown and his men had fired upon Virginia troops and police, this point was mooted. His lawyers also said that since no slaves had joined the insurrection, the charge of leading a slave insurrection should be thrown out. The jury apparently did not favor this claim, either.

Extenuating circumstances were claimed by the defense when they stressed that Colonel Washington and the other hostages were not harmed and were in fact protected by Brown during the siege. This claim was not persuasive as Colonel Washington testified that he had seen men die of gunshot wounds and had been confined for days.

A dissenting news story reported Washington having testified on the 28th:

The evidence on Friday. proving that Brown had treated his prisoners kindly, and had exercised great forbearance towards the citizens, forbidding his men to fire upon [illegible] unarmed, or into houses where women and children might be sheltered, had greatly mollified the public resentment. People began to think he was not such a terrible monster after all, and some expressions of pity for his condition were even heard; but when, upon finding that his witnesses were absent, Brown rose and denounced his counsel, declaring he had no confidence in them, the indignation of the citizens scarcely knew bounds.

The final plea by the defense team for mercy concerned the circumstances surrounding the death of two of John Brown's men, who were apparently fired upon and killed by the Virginia militia while under a flag of truce. The armed community surrounding the Federal Arsenal did not hold their fire when Brown's men emerged to parley. This incident is noticeable upon a close reading of the published testimony, but is generally neglected in more popular accounts. If the rebels under a flag of truce were deliberately fired upon, it does not appear to have been a major issue to the judge and jury.

The defense's closing argument was given by Hiram Griswold, a lawyer from Cleveland, Ohio, who arrived on October 31. Griswold was well-known as an abolitionist; he had helped fugitive slaves, and was representing Brown pro bono. In contrast, Chilton was no abolitionist, and only became involved after supporters of Brown promised to pay a very high fee, $1,000 (equivalent to $35,833 in 2025).

Brown, while making various suggestions to his attorneys, was frustrated because under Virginia law, defendants were not allowed to testify, the assumption being that they had reason not to tell the truth.

=== Verdict ===
The prosecution began its closing argument on Friday, concluding on Monday, October 31. The jury retired to consider its verdict.

The jury deliberated for only 45 minutes. When it returned, according to the report in the New York Herald, "the only calm and unruffled countenance there" was that of Brown. When the jury reported that it found him guilty of all charges, "not the slightest sound was heard in the vast crowd".

One of Brown's attorneys made "a motion for an arrest of judgment", but it was not argued. "Counsel on both sides being too much exhausted to go on, the motion was ordered to stand over until tomorrow, and Brown was again removed unsentenced to prison" (actually to the Jefferson County jail).

=== Speech to the court and sentence ===
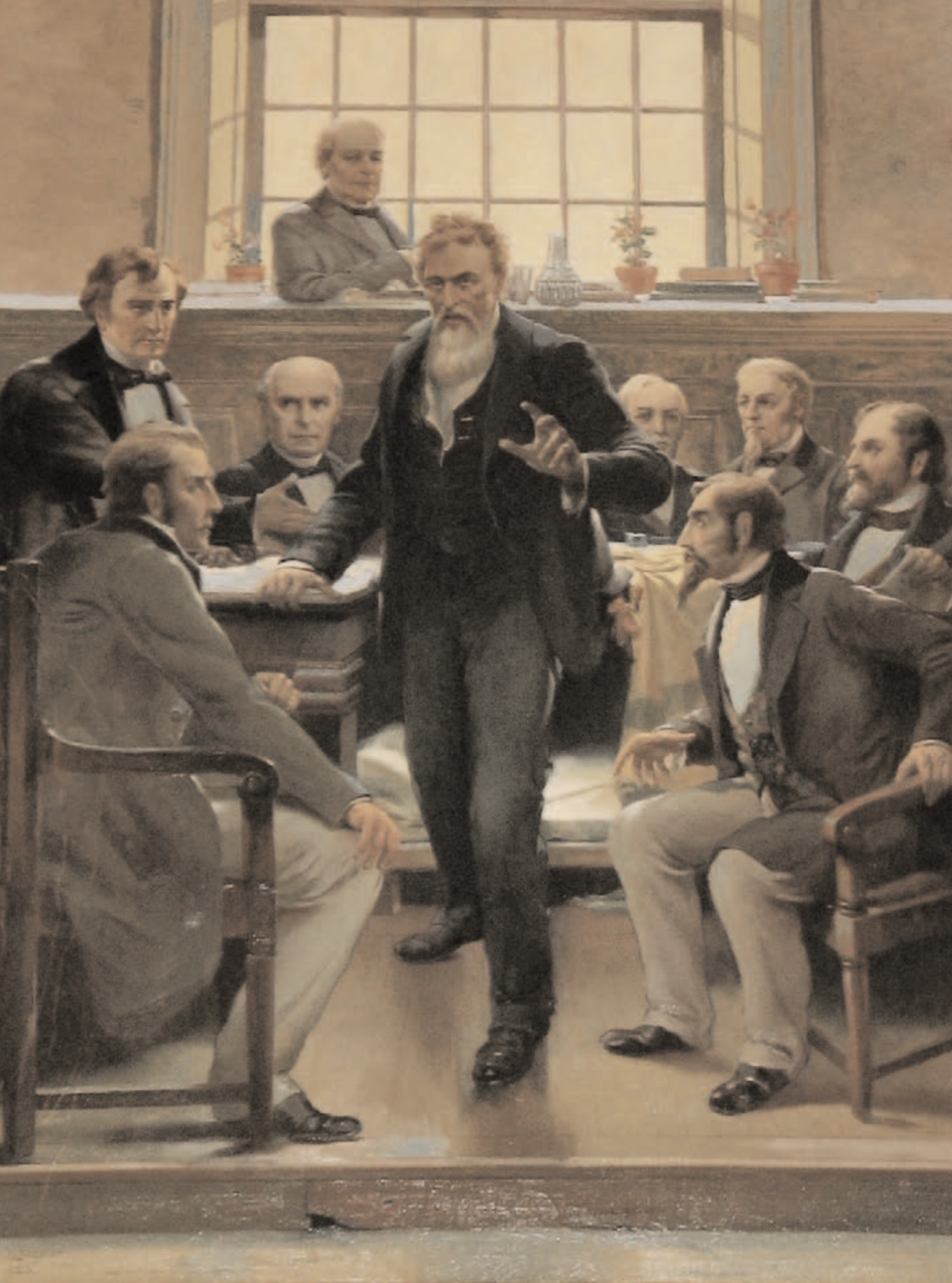
Brown arises from his cot, holds a table for support, and addresses the public. Standing is prosecutor Andrew Hunter. "John Brown's Trial at Charlestown, Va.", by David C. Lithgow, 1923. Essex County Courthouse, Elizabethtown, New York.

Brown's sentencing took place on November 2, 1859. As Virginia court procedure required, Brown was first asked to stand and say if there was reason sentence should not be passed upon him. He arose – he could now stand unassisted – and made what his first biographer called "[his] last speech". In his speech, Brown said that his only goal was to free slaves, not start a revolt, that it was God's work, that if he had been helping the rich instead of the poor he would not be in court, and also that, despite some circumstances, the entire criminal trial had been more fair than he expected. According to Ralph Waldo Emerson, this speech's only equal in American oratory is the Gettysburg Address. "His own speeches to the court have interested the nation in him," said Emerson. It was reproduced in full in at least 52 American newspapers, making the front page of the New York Times, the Richmond Dispatch, and several other papers. Wm. Lloyd Garrison printed it on a broadside and had it for sale in The Liberator's office (reproduced in Gallery, below).

After Brown completed his speech and sat back down on his cot, the entire courtroom sat in silence. According to one journalist news source: "The only demonstration made was by the clapping of the hands [applauding] of one man in the crowd, who is not a resident of Jefferson County. This was promptly suppressed, and much regret is expressed by the citizens at its occurrence." The judge then sentenced Brown to death by hanging, to take place in one month, on December 2. Brown received his death sentence with composure.

== November 2 – December 2 ==
Under Virginia law a month had to separate the sentence of death and its execution. Governor Wise resisted pressures to move up Brown's execution because, he said, he did not want anyone saying that Brown's rights had not been fully respected. The delay meant that the issue grew further; Brown's raid, trial, visitors, correspondence, upcoming execution, and Wise's role in making it happen were reported on constantly in newspapers, both local and national.

An appeal to the Virginia Court of Appeals (a petition for a Writ of Error) was not successful.

=== Expulsion of Brown's lawyers ===
After Brown's sentencing on November 2, a Wednesday, the Court proceeded with the trials of Shields Green, John Copeland Jr., John Edwin Cook, and Edwin Coppock. After conviction they were on Thursday, November 10, sentenced to death a month later. The Court session ended Friday, November 11.

On Saturday, November 12, the mayor of Charles Town, Thomas C. Green, issued a proclamation, presumably written by Hunter, telling "strangers" to leave the town or they would be subject to arrest. Delegations called on both Hoyt and Sennott to warn them of violence if they did not leave; the mayor said he had no force with which to resist the lynch mob expected to assemble the next day, Sunday. "The people of Charlestown...are wholly given up to hatred of all Northern visitors." Sennott refused, but Hoyt left the same day, together with Mr. Jewett, an artist from Frank Leslie's Illustrated Newspaper, suspected to have also been the undercover New-York Tribune reporter.

=== The question of clemency ===
Many things that Governor Wise did augmented rather than reduced tensions: by insisting he be tried in Virginia, and by turning Charles Town into an armed camp, full of state militia units. According to Franny Nudelman, "At every juncture he chose to escalate rather than pacify sectional animosity." As he put it: "We are in arms. ...We must demand of each State what position she means to maintain in the future regarding slavery."

Wise received many communications – one source says "thousands", and the Virginia General Assembly's joint committee inspected "near 500" – urging him to mitigate Brown's sentence. For example, New York City Mayor Fernando Wood, who would seriously propose that New York City secede from the Union so as to continue the cotton trade with the Confederacy, and who strongly opposed the Thirteenth Amendment ending slavery, wrote Wise on November 2. He advocated sending Brown to prison instead of executing him, saying that it was in the South's interest to do so; it would benefit the South more to behave magnanimously toward a fanatic, with whom there was sympathy, than to execute him.

Wise replied that in his view Brown should be hung, and he regretted not having gotten to Harpers Ferry fast enough to declare martial law and execute the rebels through court-martial. Brown's trial was fair and "it was impossible not to convict him." As Governor, he had nothing to do with Brown's death sentence; he did not have to sign a death warrant. His only possible involvement was from his power to pardon, and he had received "petitions, prayers, threats from almost every Free State in the Union," warning that Brown's execution would turn him into a martyr. But Wise stated that as Governor he did not have authority to pardon a traitor, only the House of Burgesses could. For the other charges, Wise believed that it would not be wise to "spare a murderer, a robber, a traitor," because of "public sentiment elsewhere". He also refused to declare Brown insane, which would have spared his life and put him in a mental hospital; Brown's supporter Gerrit Smith was forced to do that. Public sentiment in Virginia clearly wanted Brown executed. Wise was spoken of as a possible presidential candidate, and a pardon or reprieve could have ended his political career. The Richmond Enquirer, backing Wise as a presidential candidate on November 10, said that because of Wise's handling of "the Harper's Ferry affair" his "stock has gone up one hundred percent".

=== Plans for a rescue ===
After a number of other reports of rescue plans from various surrounding states, Hunter received on November 19 a telegraphic dispatch from "United States Marshal Johnson of Ohio," and Governor Wise one from the Governor of Ohio, stating that a large number of men, from 600 to 1,000, were arming under the leadership of John Brown, Jr., to attempt to retake the prisoners. After Hunter informed Governor Wise, and Wise telegraphed President Buchanan, Buchanan sent two companies of artillery from Fort Monroe to Harpers Ferry. Wise sent "detectives" to Harpers Ferry, charging Hunter to use them to investigate rescue efforts from Ohio. "I sent one to Oberlin, who joined the party there, slept one night in the same bed as John Brown, Jr., and reported to me their doings out and out," said Hunter. Hunter had "troops" moved to block entry from Ohio into Virginia. Nothing significant came of any of these rescue plans.

Brown friend and admirer Thomas Wentworth Higginson traveled to North Elba in November, unsuccessfully seeking Mary Brown's support for a rescue attempt. He and Lysander Spooner, two weeks before the execution, were prevented only by lack of funds from kidnapping Governor Wise and holding him hostage in exchange for Brown's release.

At one point, Silas Soule, a young abolitionist who used to know Brown from the conflict of Bleeding Kansas, infiltrated the Charles Town jail one evening by getting himself arrested and contacted Brown in his jail cell with the offer to break him out during the night. Soule claimed that Brown did not want to be rescued. Brown allegedly told Soule that he had already decided to be executed as a martyr for the abolitionist cause. After Soule was released from the jail the following day, he quietly and uneventfully left Charles Town, leaving Brown behind to be executed.

Higginson accompanied Mary to Harpers Ferry to recover John's body after his execution.

=== Brown's numerous visitors and extensive correspondence ===
During the month between his conviction and the day of his execution, Brown wrote over 100 letters, in which he described his vision of a post-slavery America in eloquent and spiritual terms. Most of them, and a few letters to him, were immediately published in newspapers and pamphlets. They were hugely influential in accelerating the abolition movement and putting slaveholders on the defensive.

He had previously been prevented by the Court from "making a full statement of his motives and intentions through the press", as he desired; the Court had "refused all access to reporters". Now that he had been convicted and sentenced, there were no more restrictions on visitors, and Brown, relishing the publicity his anti-slavery views received, talked to reporters or anyone else that wanted to see him, although abolitionists, like Rebecca Buffum Spring, could only visit him with great difficulty. "I have very many visits from pro-slavery persons almost daily, & I endeavor to Improve them faifthfully, plainly, and kindly."

He states that he welcomes every one, and that he is preaching, even in jail, with great effect, upon the enormities of slavery.

A scholar estimates the number of visitors received during that month as 800: politicians (including Governor Wise and a Virginia senator), reporters, foes, and friends. He wrote to his wife that he had received so many "kind and encouraging letters" that he could not possibly reply to them all. "I do not think that I ever enjoyed life better than since my confinement here," he wrote on November 24. "I certainly think I was never more cheerful in my life." "My mind is very tranquil, I may say joyous."

On November 28, Brown wrote the following to an Ohio friend, Daniel R. Tilden:

I have enjoyed remarkable cheerfulness and composure of mind since my confinement; and it is a great comfort to feel assured that I am permitted to die (for a cause)[,] not merely to pay the debt of nature (as all must). I feel myself to be most unworthy of so great distinction. The particular matter of dying assigned to me, gives me but very little uneasyness. I wish I had the time and the ability to give you (my dear friend) some little idea of what is daily and I might almost say hourly, passing within my prison walls; and could my friends but witness only a few of those scenes just as they occur, I think they would feel very well reconciled to my being here just what I am and just as I am. My whole life before had not afforded me one-half the opportunity to plead for the right. In this also I find much to reconcile me to both my present condition and my immediate prospect. I may be very insane (and I am so, if insane at all). But if that be so, insanity is like a very pleasant dream to me... I have scarce realized that I am in prison, or in irons, at all. I certainly think I was never more cheerful in my life.

=== Contemporary assessments ===
Northerners commemorated the trial and coming execution with public prayers, church services, marches, and meetings. Ralph Waldo Emerson's prediction, in a lecture on November 8, that Brown, if executed, "would make the gallows glorious, like the cross," "was responded to by the immense audience in the most enthusiastic manner." His quote was reprinted all over the country: By December 2, "the entire nation" was fixated on Brown.

The New York Independent said the following of him during this month:

The brave old man who lies in prison at Charlestown, Virginia, awaiting the day of his execution, is teaching this nation lessons of heroism, faith and duty, which will awaken its sluggish moral sense, and the almost forgotten memories of the heroes of the Revolution.

In contrast, the Richmond Dispatch called him a "scoundrel", adding that he was "a cold-blooded, midnight murderer, with not a particle of humanity or generosity belonging to his character." "The recent events at Harper's Ferry have very much roused the military spirit among us."

=== Help for Mary Brown and other relatives ===
A meeting was held in the Tremont Temple, Boston, on November 19, "in aid of the suffering families of John Brown and his associates". Attendance was over 2,000. Presiding was John A. Andrew; his speech and his other testimony supporting Brown, including "John Brown and John A. Andrew" (pp. 13–15), reprinted from the Boston Traveller, were published in 1860 to help his successful campaign for Governor of Massachusetts.

=== Visit from Henry Clay Pate ===
His visitors included his pro-slavery enemy from Kansas Henry Clay Pate, who came 175 miles (282 km) from his home in Petersburg to Charles Town to see Brown. They prepared a statement, witnessed by Capt. John Avis and two others, about events at the Battle of Black Jack.

=== Visit from his wife Mary ===
John repeatedly expressed his desire that Mary not visit him, as that would "add to my affliction, & cannot possibly do me any good". It would use some of her scant resources, and subject her to being "a gazing stock throughout the whole journey, to be remarked upon in every look, word and action by all sorts of creatures and all sorts of papers."

Despite her husband's words, Mary set out anyway for Charles Town. Brown's friend Thomas Higginson went to North Elba so as to escort her. By the time John heard about her trip, she was in Philadelphia, and he had his lawyer telegraph "Mary's abolitionist hosts in Philadelphia" (James Miller McKim) to detain her.

Mary did, however, reach Charles Town, and was allowed by Virginia Governor Wise to visit Brown for several hours on December 1, though she was not allowed to stay with him overnight.

=== His will ===
John Brown's first will is dated November 18, 1859. According to other sources, the identical document was prepared December 1, in the presence of his wife, by Judge Andrew Hunter, witnessed by Hunter and the jailor Captain John Avis. He distributed his few possessions – his surveyor's tools, his silver watch, the family Bible – to his surviving children. Bibles were to be purchased for each of his children and grandchildren.

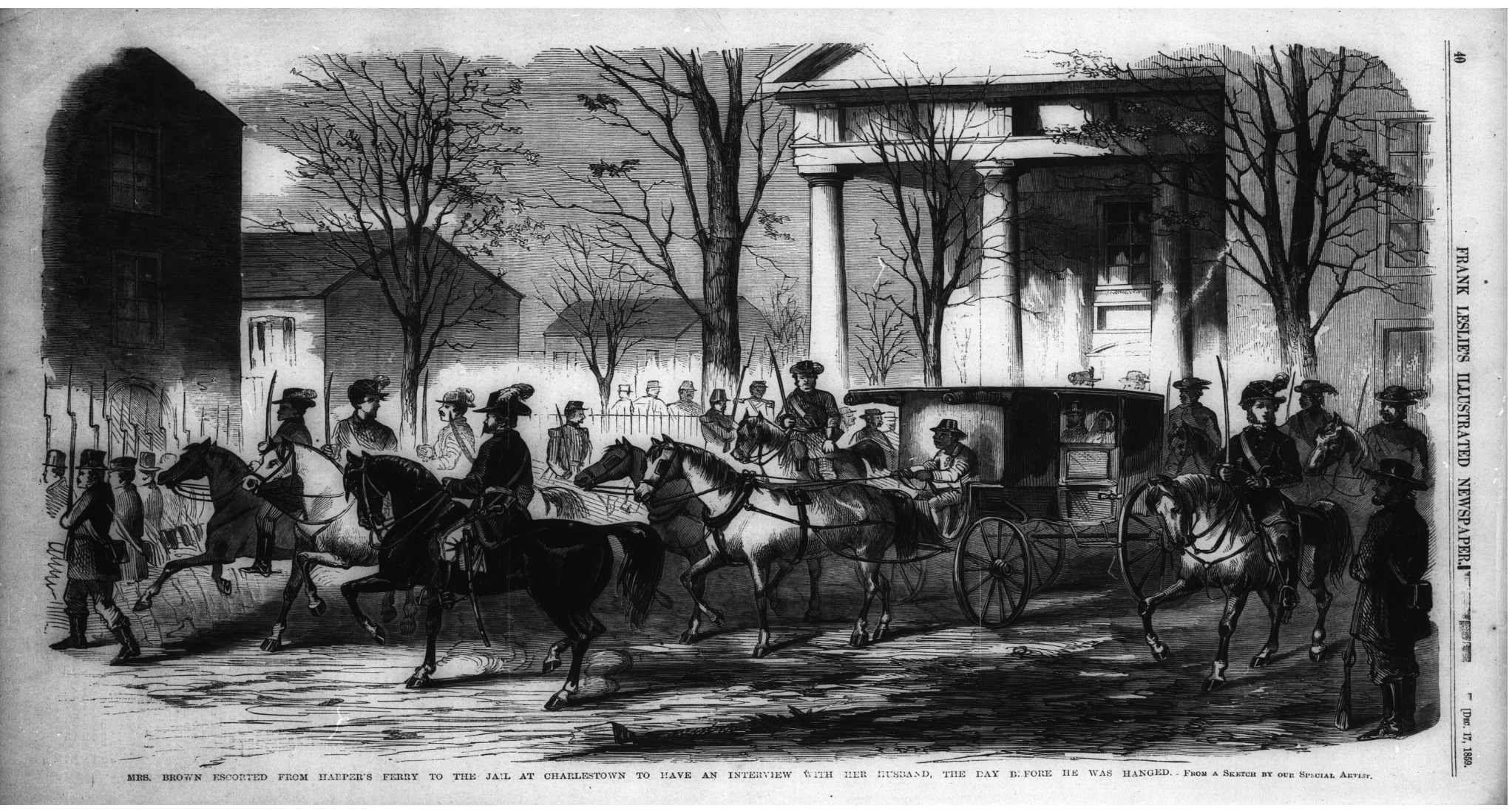
Mary Brown escorted to visit her husband John Brown, the day before his execution. From Frank Leslie's Illustrated Weekly, December 17, 1859.

Brown made a second will, the morning of his execution, in which he authorized the Sheriff of Jefferson County to sell his pikes and guns, if they could be found, and give the money to his wife.

In his correspondence Brown mentioned several times how well he was treated by Avis, who was also in charge of Brown's execution and the one who put the noose around his neck. Avis was described by a visitor to the jail as Brown's friend. Brown's wife had arrived on December 1, and the couple had their last dinner with Avis's family in their apartment at the jail. That is where they last saw each other. According to Andrew Hunter,

The only time that I witnessed any exhibition of temper on the part of Brown was in the interview we had about Mrs. Brown. Gen. Talliaferro told me that his instructions were to send her back [to Harpers Ferry] that night. He showed a good deal of temper, as he wanted her to remain all night. It was determined otherwise, and when I explained to Brown fully the reason of it, he again acquiesced and took leave of her after she had eaten her supper with the family of the jailer, Avis. She was treated throughout with the most marked respect.

=== Brown's last words ===
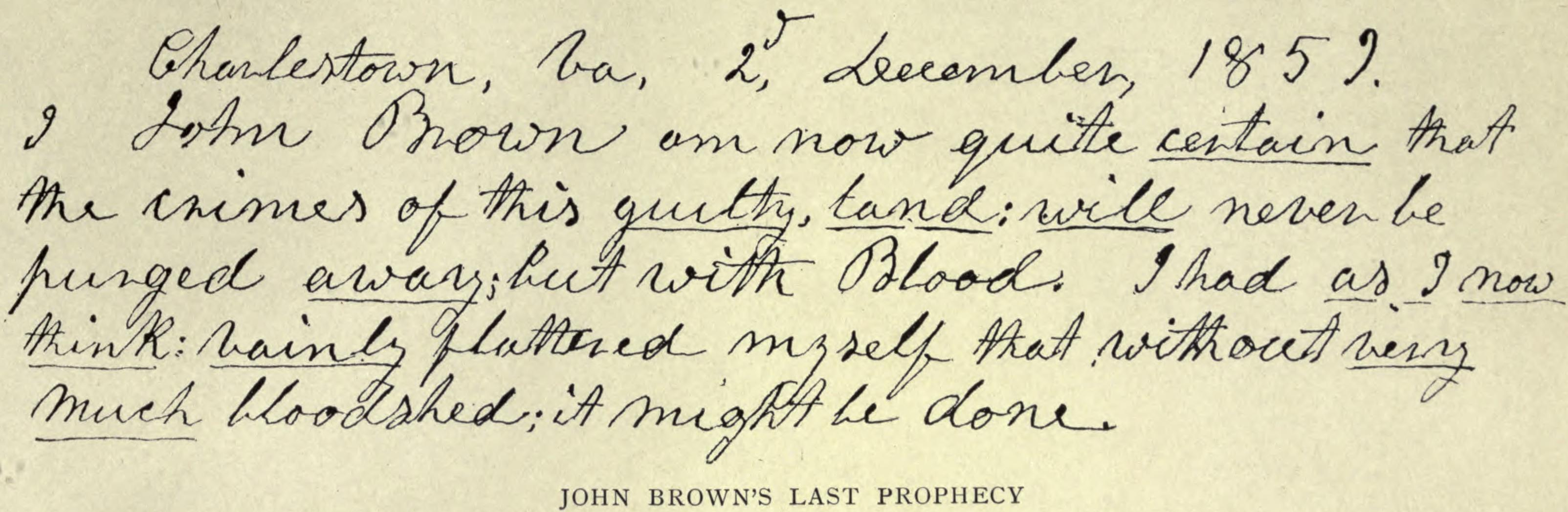
John Brown's last words

Brown was well read and knew that the last words of prominent people are often given special attention. Just before his execution he wrote his final words on a piece of paper and gave it to his kind jailor, Avis, who conserved it as a treasure:

Charlestown, Va. 2nd December, 1859. I John Brown am now quite certain that the crimes of this guilty, land: will never be purged away; but with Blood. I had as I now think: vainly flattered myself that without very much bloodshed; it might be done.

"Without very much bloodshed" is an allusion to his own failed project to free the slaves, which in hindsight he saw as vanity and self-flattery.

This document was reproduced, and copies were made available as a souvenir when John Brown's Fort was exhibited at the Columbian Exposition in Chicago, in 1893.

He gave a similar, even stronger form of the same statement to jailer Hiram O'Bannon:

I am now convinced that the great iniquity which hangs over this country cannot be purged without immense bloodshed. When I first came to this State I thought differently, but am now convinced that I was mistaken.

== Execution ==
Brown was the first person executed for treason in the history of the United States. He was hanged on December 2, 1859, at about 11:15 AM, in a vacant field several blocks away from the Jefferson County jail. According to the correspondent of the New York Times:

There is everywhere discernable here a vague dread of some fearful expression of sympathy with Brown on the fateful Friday.

[I]t is strange and sad, assuredly, that in one State of the American Union, it should be found necessary to surround with a guard of five thousand soldiers, the scaffold of a condemned man, in honor of whom, in other States of the same Union, the bells of churches will be tolling, and the voices of Christian congregations lifted in prayer, at the same hour of his death.

According to jailer John Avis, Brown was the happiest man in Charles Town.

=== Spectators ===
Brown was not the only happy man present. For those who supported slavery, the execution of Brown was a momentous event— the insurrectionist who posed a threat to the institution of slavery was punished. The rope with which Brown was to be hanged, made of South Carolina cotton, as visitors were told, was on display in the Sheriff's office. The Southern press was there in force. Hundreds of people visited the carpenter making Brown's coffin, asking for a piece of the board. Yet there were "very few strangers", according to a reporter who concealed his name.

An article on the mood in Charles Town on the eve of Brown's execution is entitled "Revelry". The day before the execution the military held a dress parade; two weeks later, another was held the day before the executions of Brown's four captured allies, Green, Copeland, Cook, and Coppic. Members of the Young Guard, from Richmond, went door to door, "treating the fair occupants to some vocal as well as instrumental music." A military band, arrived from Richmond, briefly made everything "gleeful". The fife and kettle-drum were heard "continually".

In attendance were figures notable for their part in the Civil War, including Thomas Jackson (later known as "Stonewall Jackson"), Robert E. Lee, Virginia militia men, and 2,000 Federal troops. Actor John Wilkes Booth was present. Booth would five years later assassinate President Lincoln, in response to Lincoln's support for extending voting rights to black Americans, which Booth called "nigger citizenship". He had read in a newspaper about the upcoming execution of Brown, whom he called "the grandest character of this century." Booth abandoned rehearsals at the Richmond Theater to travel to Charles Town specifically to see the execution. So as to gain access that the public would not have, he donned for one day a borrowed uniform of the Richmond Grays, a volunteer militia of 1,500 men traveling to Charles Town for Brown's hanging, to guard against a possible attempt to rescue Brown from the gallows by force. Planter and pro-slavery activist Edmund Ruffin, traditionally credited with firing the first shot of the Civil War at Fort Sumter, did the same. That Governor Wise would not be present made the paper, as did the fact that his son, newspaper editor O. Jennings Wise, was there as a militia member.

About 2,000 "excursionists" intended to attend the execution, but the Baltimore and Ohio Railroad refused to transport them, and Governor Wise shut down the Winchester and Potomac Railroad for anything other than military use. Threatening to invoke martial law, Wise asked all citizens to remain at home, as did the mayor of Charles Town (see below). A prospective visitor from northwestern Pennsylvania, where Brown had lived for 11 years, was told in Philadelphia not to proceed, as martial law had in fact been declared in "the country around Charles Town". Militia had been stationed in Charles Town continuously from the arrest until the execution, to prevent a much-feared armed rescue of Brown.

Military orders for the day of execution had 14 points. The telegraph was restricted to military use.

As further protection, "a field-piece loaded with grape and canister had been planted directly in front of and aimed at the scaffold, so as to blow poor Brown's body to smithereens in the event of attempted rescue." "The outer line of military will be nearly a mile from the scaffold, and the inner line so distant that not a word John Brown may speak can be heard."

Gov. Wise...gives as the reason for this exclusion of all save the military, that in the event of an attempted rescue an order to fire upon the prisoner will be given, and that those within the line, especially those sufficiently near the gallows to hear what Brown may say, would inevitably share his fate.

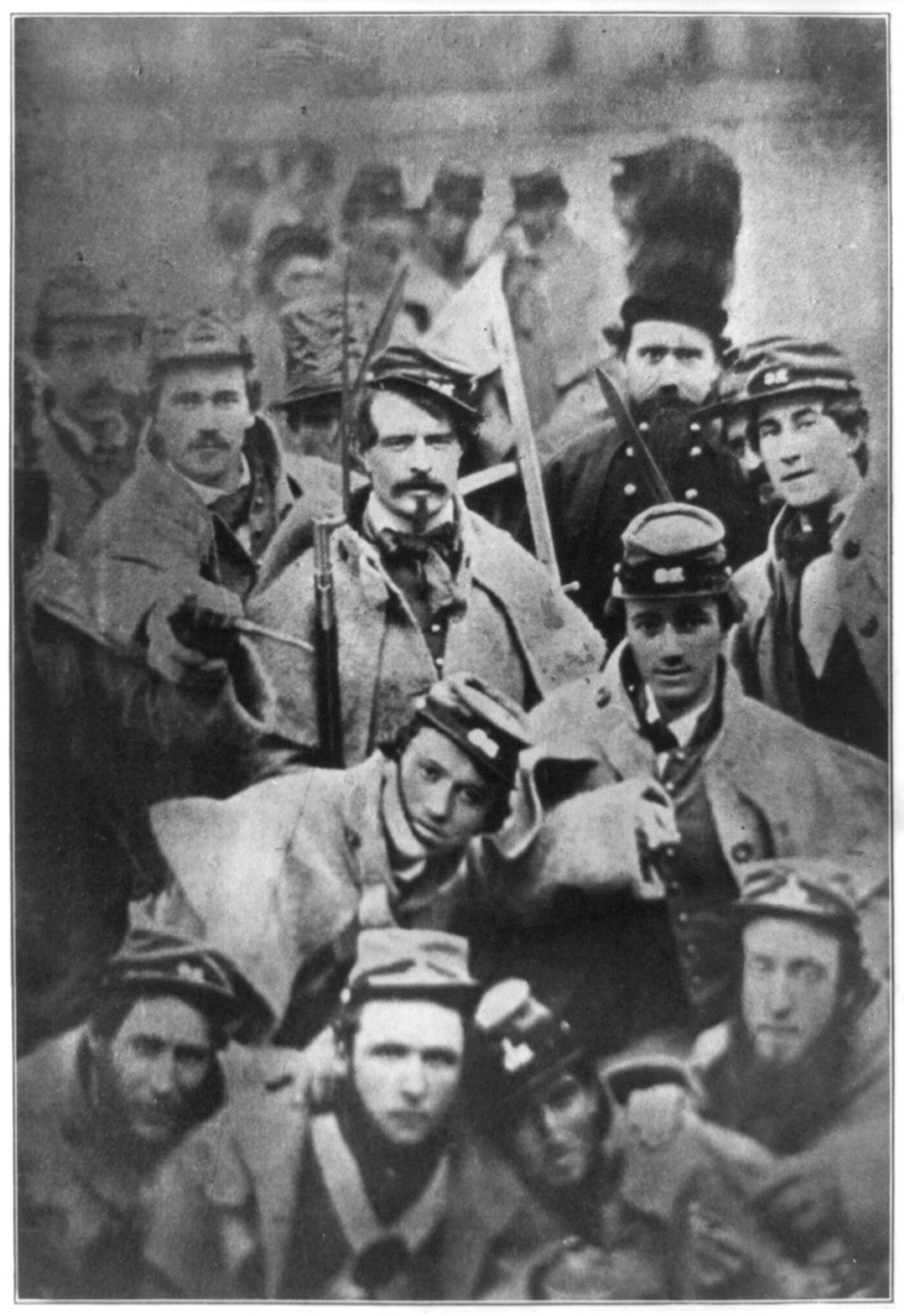
Soldiers from Richmond Grays at John Brown's execution. Includes John Wilkes Booth (third row left). For identification of the others pictured, click here.

When the four collaborators arrested and convicted with Brown were hanged two weeks later, on December 16, there were no restrictions, and 1,600 spectators came to Charles Town "to witness the last act of the Harpers Ferry tragedy".

=== The gallows ===
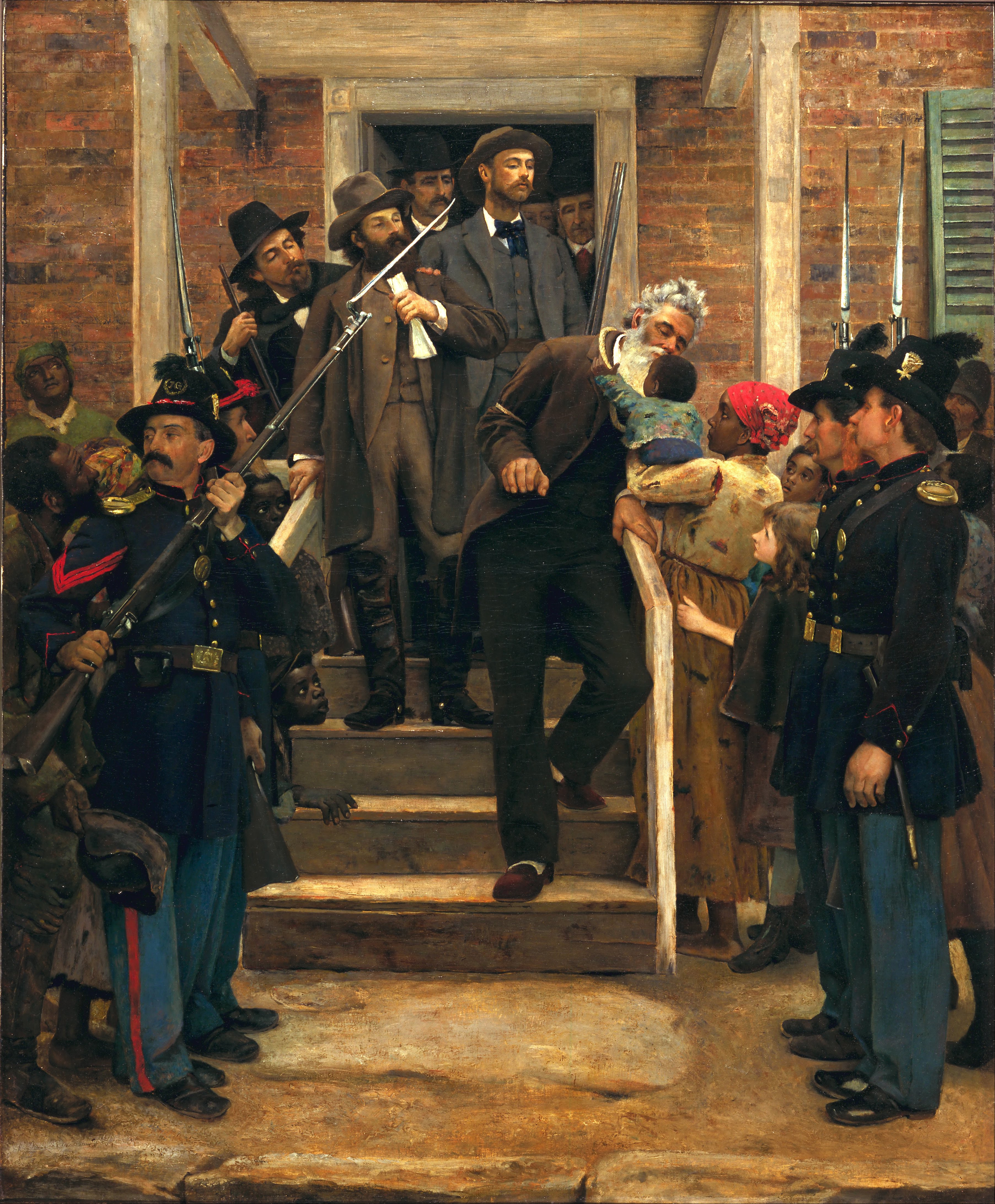
Thomas Hovenden – The Last Moments of John Brown, 1882. Note Brown kissing black baby as he leaves the jail (a legend).

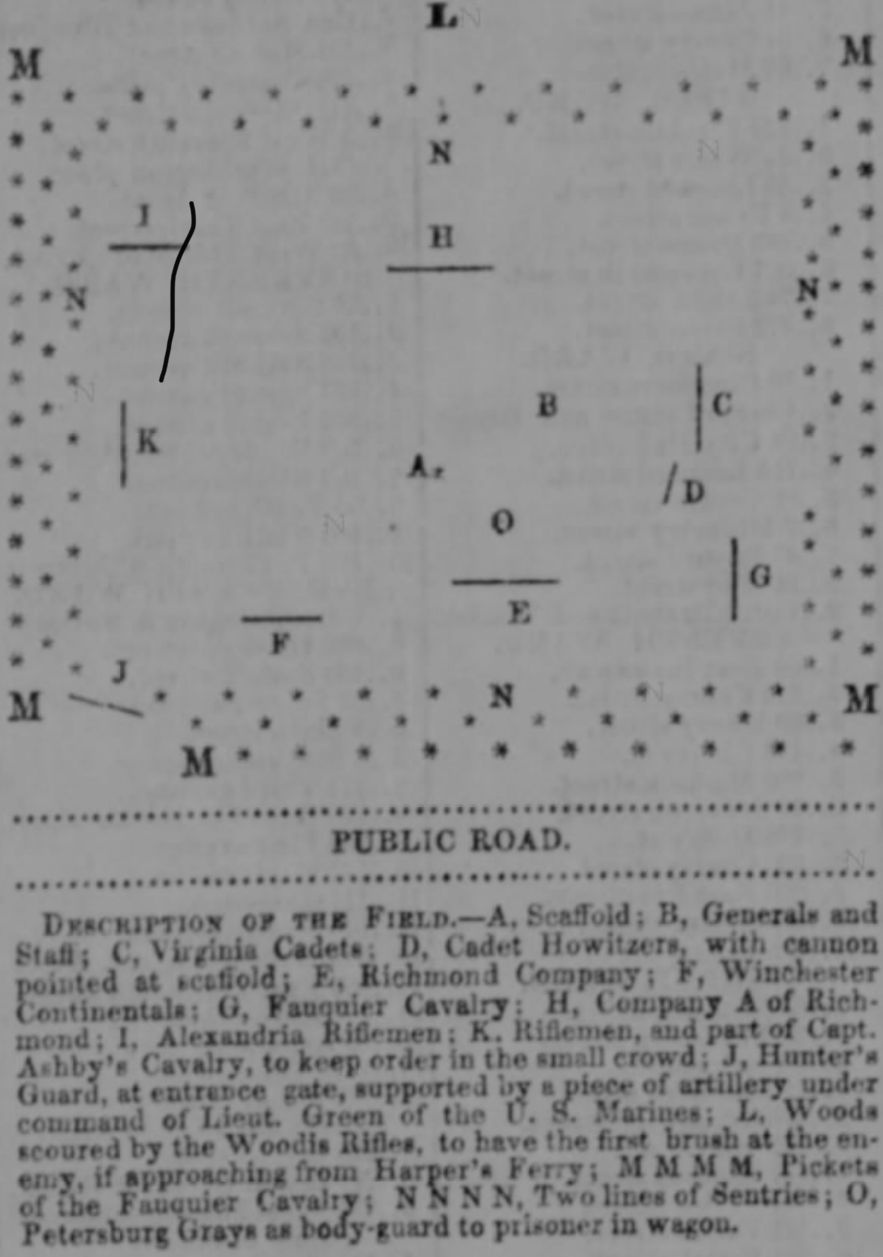
John Brown's scaffold

According to legend, popularized by a painting of Thomas Hovenden, Brown kissed a black baby when leaving the jail en route to the gallows. Several men who were present specifically deny it. For example, Prosecuting Attorney Andrew Hunter: "That whole story about his kissing a negro child as he went out of the jail is utterly and absolutely false from beginning to end. Nothing of the kind occurred – nothing of the sort could have occurred. He was surrounded by soldiers and no negro could get access to him."

On the short trip from the jail to the gallows, during which he sat on his coffin in a furniture wagon, Brown was protected on both sides by lines of troops, to prevent an armed rescue. As Governor Wise did not want Brown making another speech, after leaving the jail and on the gallows, spectators and reporters were kept far enough away that Brown could not have been heard.

On his way to the gallows he remarked to the Sheriff on the beauty of the country and the excellence of the soil. "This is the first time I have had the pleasure of seeing it." He asked the Sheriff and Avis not to make him wait. He "walked to the scaffold as coolly as if going to dinner", according to Hunter.

After some twenty minutes,

A small group of doctors could not agree among themselves whether John Brown was dead. After thirty-eight minutes, they cut him down and his body fell in a heap on the scaffold. Once more they listened for a heartbeat and finally pronounced him dead. The body was taken back to the jail for the doctors to sign a death certificate, but when they removed the hood, they were disturbed by his appearance. Unlike a hanged man, his face had not blackened, the eyes did not protrude, and there were no discharges from his nose or mouth. The doctors argued. No one would sign the death certificate. One said he would issue a certificate only if Brown were decapitated. Another suggested they administer a massive dose of strychnine. They decided to go to lunch and give the body time to stiffen. Three and a half hours after the hanging they finally signed the death certificate.

Spectators took pieces of the gallows, or a lock of Brown's hair. The rope, specially made for the execution out of South Carolina cotton, was cut up into pieces and distributed "to those that were anxious to have it". A different report says that the South Carolina rope was not strong enough, and a hemp rope from Kentucky was used instead; a rope had also been sent from Missouri.

The gallows were built into the porch of a house under construction in Charles Town "to hide them from the Yankees". Twenty-five years later, "a syndicate of relic hunters" purchased them from the house owner. They were shown at the 1893 Columbian Exposition, along with John Brown's Fort.

=== John Brown's body ===
Governor Wise had John's body released to his widow Mary, who was awaiting it in Harpers Ferry. She and supporters traveled, via Philadelphia, Troy, New York, and Rutland, Vermont, to John Brown's Farm, in North Elba, New York, near the modern village of Lake Placid. The funeral and burial took place there on December 8, 1859. Rev. Joshua Young presided. Wendell Phillips spoke.

== Aftermath ==
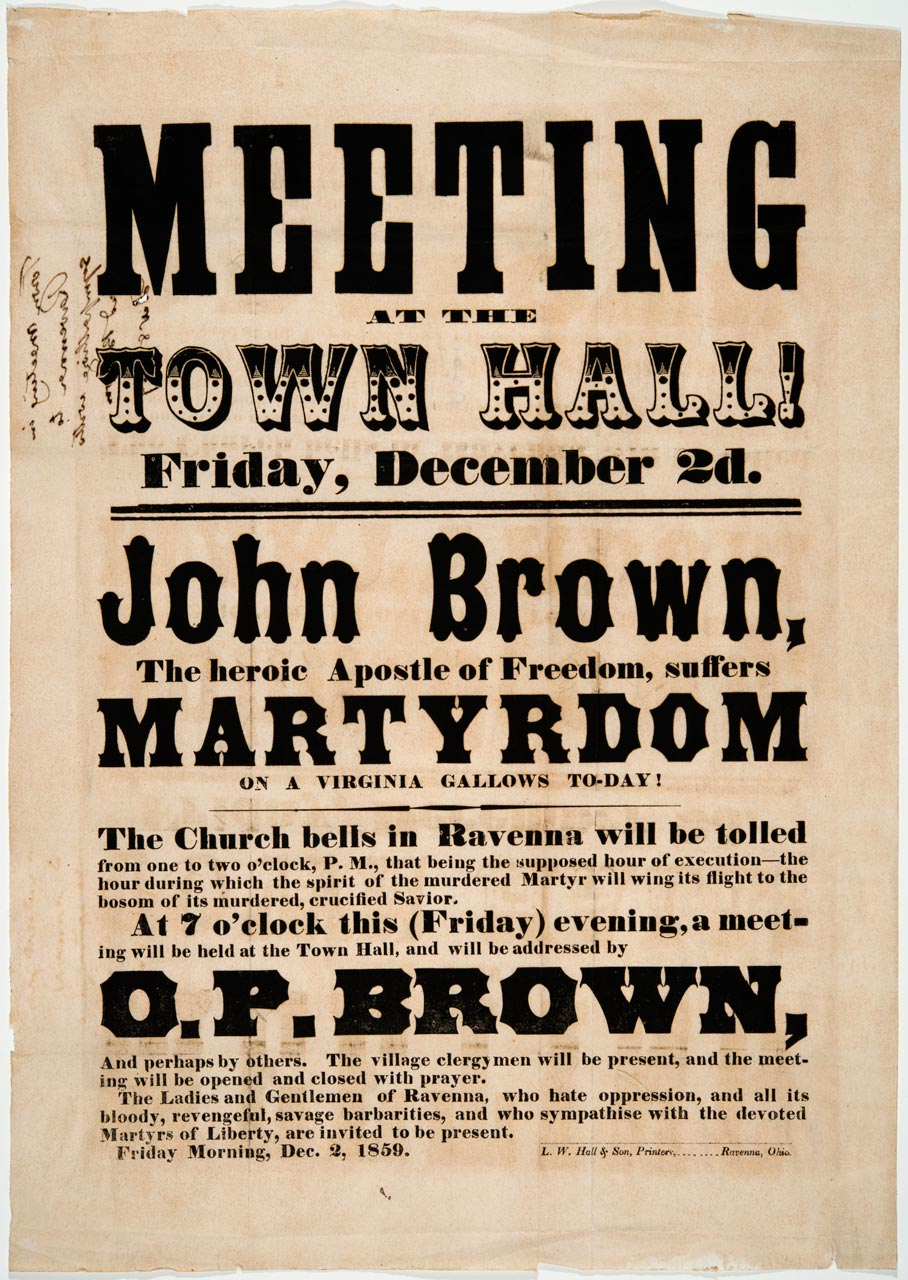
Bells were tolled in Ravenna, Ohio, after Brown's execution.

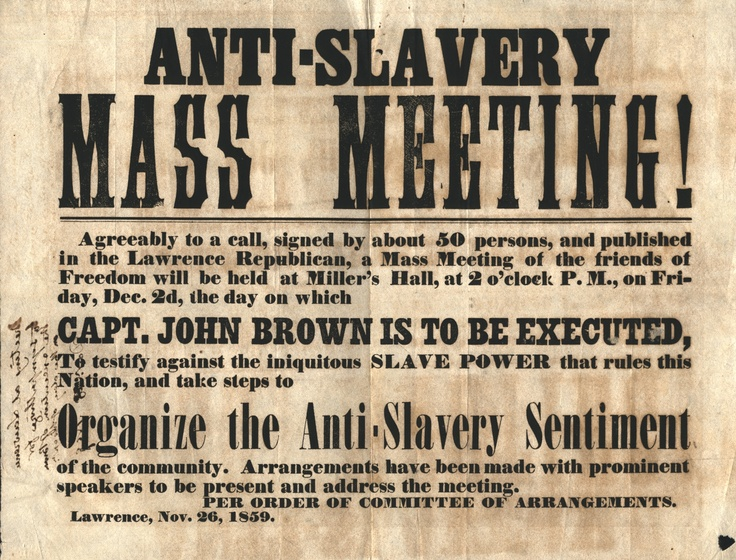
Poster calling for anti-slavery meeting in Lawrence, Kansas, on the day of Brown's execution.

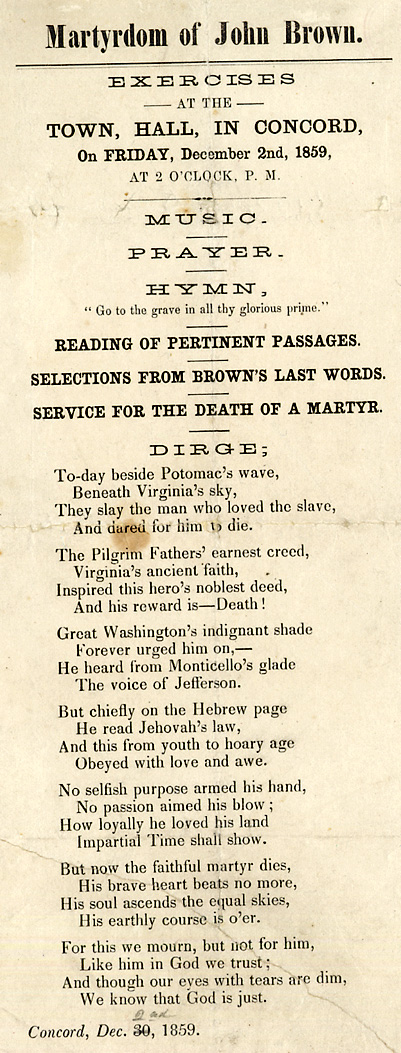
Exercises in Concord, Massachusetts

"In the minds of Southerners, Brown was the greatest threat to slavery the South had ever witnessed." His execution on December 2 was what most white Southerners wanted, but it gave them little relief from their panic. "The South was visibly beside itself with rage and terror." According to Dennis Frye, formerly the chief historian at the Harpers Ferry National Historical Park, "this was the South's Pearl Harbor, its ground zero". Northern-inspired revolt of their allegedly happy enslaved was the South's worst nightmare, and it was taken for granted that others would soon follow in Brown's footsteps.

In the North the result was the opposite. "We shall be a thousand times more Anti-Slavery than we ever dared to think of being before," proclaimed a Massachusetts newspaper. "The attempt of John Brown has not had much effect, but the manner in which that attempt is received at the North is what has done the injury. The orations, speeches, sympathy, approvals, the proposal to toll bells, close stores, &c., without any public manifestation to the contrary, has created a state of feeling at the South that is not to be described."

=== Meetings ===
Across the North, except for the large cities which feared the economic effect of Southern secession (Boston, New York, Philadelphia), the day Brown was hanged was treated as a day of national calamity: bells were rung, meetings held, speeches and sermons given, the flag flown at half-mast. "'The times that tried men's souls' have come again." "Martyr Services, as they were called, were held in many Northern localities." Huge prayer meetings were held in Concord, New Bedford, Worcester, and Plymouth, Massachusetts, and many other cities. Churches and temples were full of mourners. The chapel of Yale College was draped in mourning. In New York City, "lectures, discourses, speeches and poems are delivered every night everywhere, by everybody, pro and con, on John Brown, on Osawatomie Brown, on Old Brown, on Captain Brown, and on The Hero of Harper's Ferry. ...Truly this old farmer has made such a stir as not all the statesmen, ...little giants, and professional agitators have been able to produce, and which they are much less able to quiet."

In Concord, Massachusetts, a ceremony was held at the Town Hall, in which an organ had been placed for the occasion. Henry Thoreau was a key speaker, as was Ralph Waldo Emerson. The "celebrated" words of President Thomas Jefferson on slavery were read. A considerable portion of the Wisdom of Solomon was read.

In Boston, flags were at half-mast, and memorial services were held in the public schools. A year later, however, an attempt by Wm. Lloyd Garrison, James Redpath, Franklin B. Sanborn, and Frederick Douglass to commemorate the execution in Tremont Temple could not take place because they were met with violence.

In Albany, New York, Brown received a slow 100-gun salute. In Syracuse, New York, City Hall was "densely packed" with citizens, who listened to over three hours of speeches and contributed "a large amount of money" to aid his family. The City Hall bell was rung 63 times, "the strokes corresponding with Brown's age". (Brown was 59.) There was a large meeting in Rochester, New York. In Philadelphia, a sympathy meeting was held in Shiloh Hall; December 2 was designated "Martyr Day". In National Hall there was that evening "an extensive Brown meeting", with "an overflow crowd of more than 4,000". Three letters Brown sent from jail were read, and Theodore Tilton, whose speech was immediately published, compared the "martyr" Brown with Biblical figures and other historical martyrs.

In Cleveland there was a crowd of 5,000; the Melodeon was draped in mourning. Across a main street was a banner with the quote: "I do not think I can better honor the cause I love than to die for it". Some businesses closed; in Akron, court adjourned. A memorial meeting at Empire Hall in Akron was addressed by Ohio Attorney General Christopher Wolcott and other gentleman, and a poem was recited.

In Milwaukee, Wisconsin, 100 guns were fired at noon.

In Montreal, there were "numerously attended" meetings on December 2, at which a collection for Brown's family was taken. In Port-au-Prince, Haiti, there were three days of mourning, all flags were at half-mast, and houses and the cathedral were draped in black. They raised $2,240 (equivalent to $80,267 in 2025) to assist his widow Mary, which she had not received as of July 1860; later they sent $1,600 to Mary and $200 each to Cook's and Leahy's widows, John Brown Jr., Owen Brown, and Osborne Anderson. Haitians also sent to the U.S. 2,000 bags of coffee, of 120 pounds (54 kg) each, to be sold to benefit the fund. Avenue John Brown is the only major street anywhere in the world named for Brown. There is also an avenue named for abolitionist Massachusetts senator Charles Sumner.

In the United States, as of July 1860, $6,150 (~$220,375 in 2025) had been raised to help the Brown widows and others affected by the raid.

In Princeton, New Jersey, on December 3 students demonstrated against Brown, and burned William H. Seward and Henry Ward Beecher in effigy. In Boston, on December 8, former Massachusetts Governors Edward Everett and Levi Lincoln Jr. addressed an anti-John Brown rally, that filled Faneuil Hall to capacity. The participation of former president Franklin Pierce had been announced, but he sent a letter of regret. A similar rally was held the same day in Philadelphia.

=== Publications ===
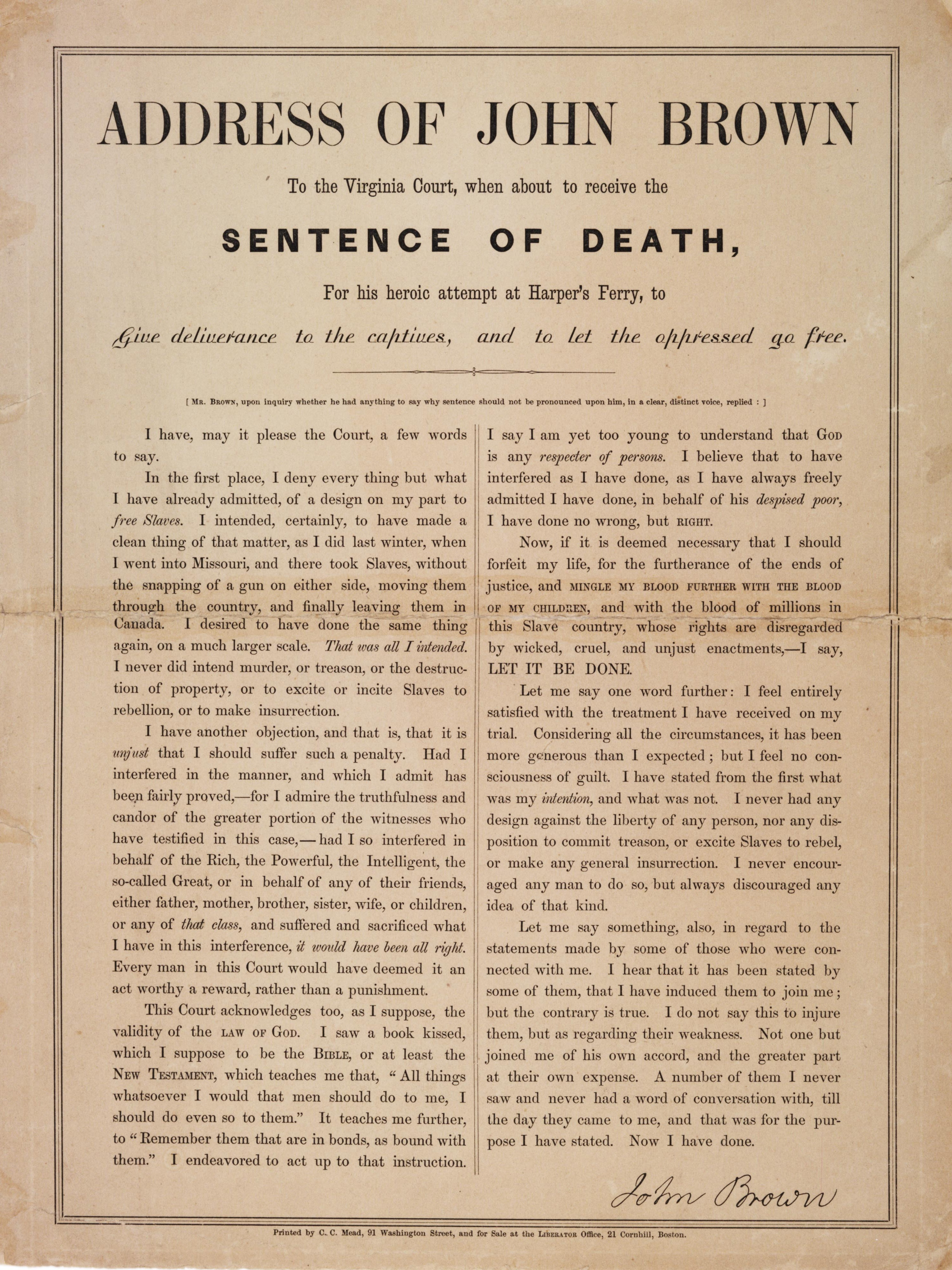
Poster of John Brown's last speech, published by Wm. Lloyd Garrison and sold at The Liberator office.

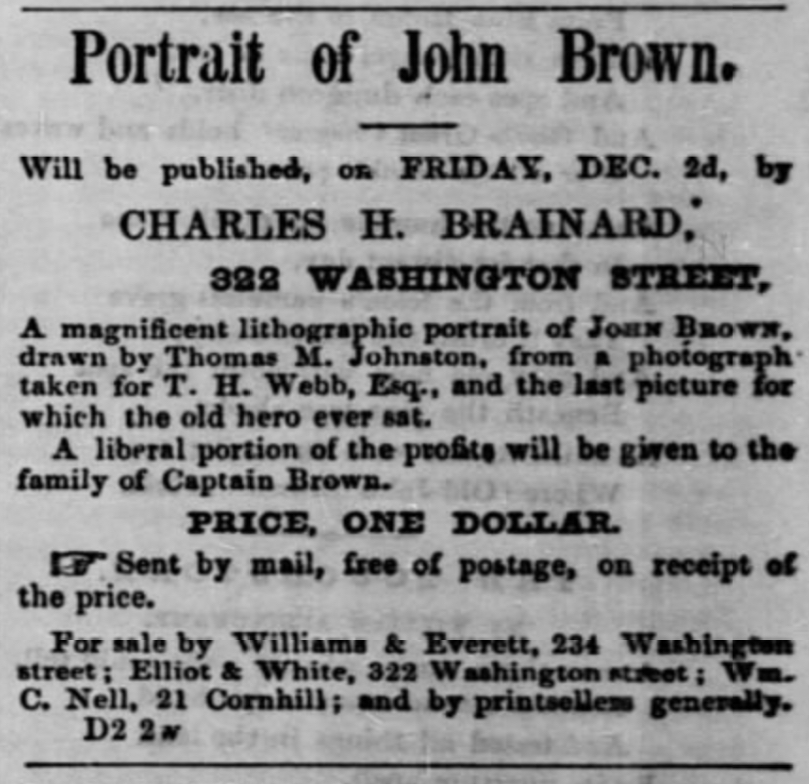
Advertisement for portrait of John Brown

Newspapers and magazines had whole sections on the episode. A poster (broadside) was made of Brown's last speech (see left). As there was as yet no process to print a photograph, a lithographed [engraved] reproduction of his last photograph and his signature were offered for sale for $1, to benefit the Brown family.

Pamphlets started to appear as soon as Brown was sentenced, before his execution. There were more just after his execution. A pamphlet of John A. Andrew, Republican candidate for Governor of Massachusetts, proudly states his connection with Brown, and his efforts for Brown's widow and children. There were also anti-Brown pamphlets.

In December two books on Brown (by De Witt and Pate) were published. A third, by Thomas Drew, was copyrighted in December, although it appeared in 1860; De Witt almost immediately issued a 2nd edition with additional material.

Noticing with what eager desire everything relating to the affair was sought by all classes of people, and the especial interest that was manifested in every circumstance that related personally to "The Hero of Harper's Ferry," [Drew] has sought to combine in these pages every fact and incident relating to the event, which the friends and admirers of the man would wish to preserve, as mementoes of the simplicity of his character, the nobility of his purposes, the disinterestedness of his motives, the sublime heroism of his deeds, and the remarkable piety by which he was governed and sustained.

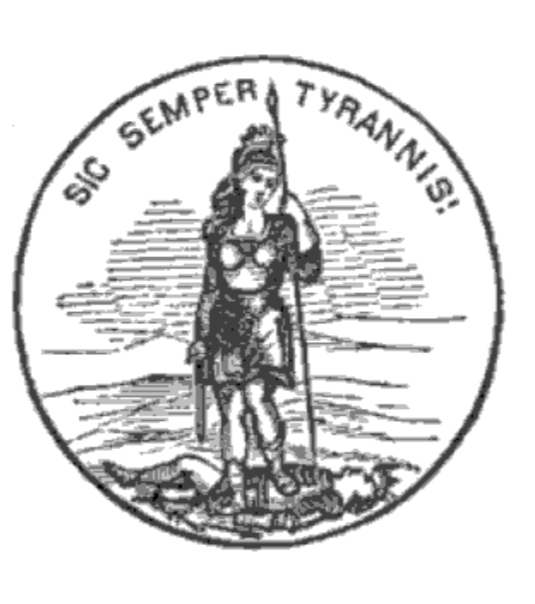
The seal of Virginia with exclamation point added, as seen on the title page of James Redpath's Public Life of Capt. John Brown (1860), repeated on his Echoes of Harper's Ferry (1860). Instead of Virginia rebelling against the tyrant England, Brown is here the rebel, and slaveholders are the tyrants.

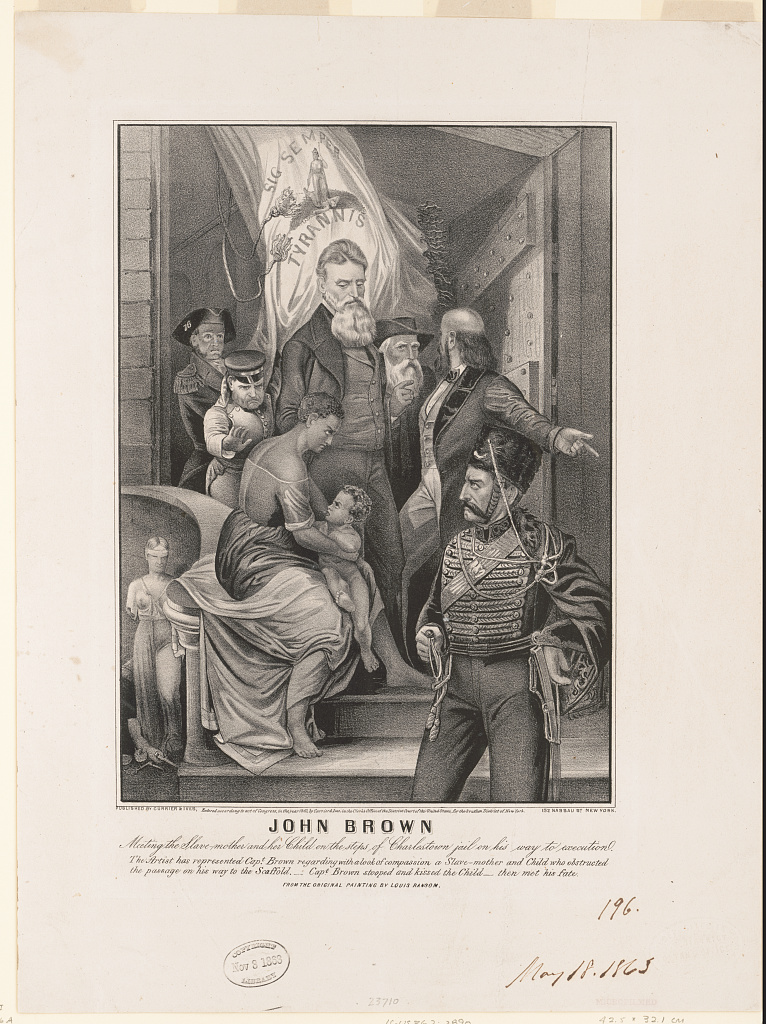
John Brown leaving the jail. Above his head, like a halo, the flag of Virginia and its motto, Sic semper tyrannis. Note skin colors of Black woman and her baby. Currier and Ives print, 1863.

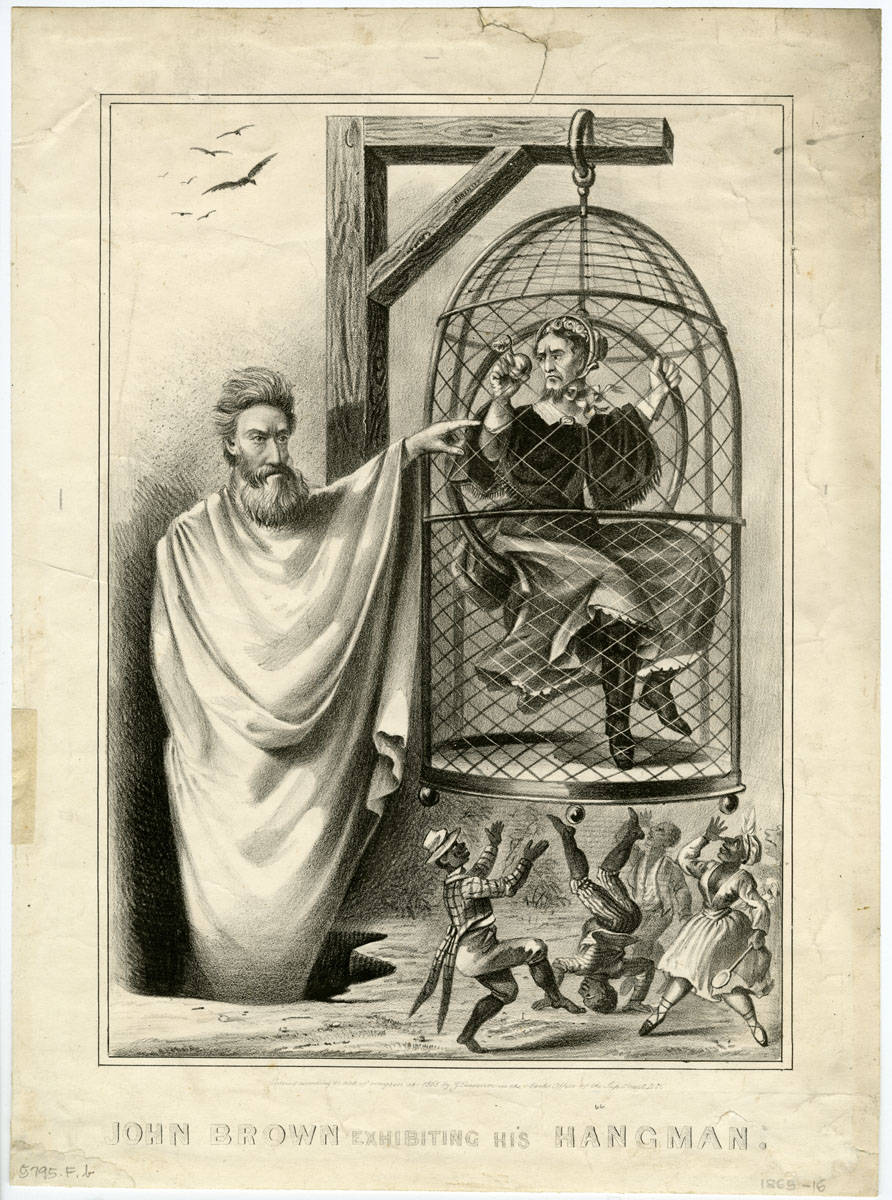
John Brown the hangman, his ghost arising from the ground; the imprisoned Jefferson Davis in a birdcage, wearing a dress, as he did when fleeing Virginia in 1865, and carrying a sour apple. (In the marching song John Brown's Body, Davis was to be hanged from a sour apple tree.) Minstrels rejoice beneath. 1865?

It is no coincidence that the preface of the fourth, by the family's preferred biographer, James Redpath, is dated December 25, 1859, as Brown was sometimes seen, and saw himself, as Christ, or Moses leading the Israelites out of slavery. On the title page it has a version of the seal of Virginia, with its motto, "Sic semper tyrannis" ('Thus always to tyrants'), exclamation point added. Virginia is now the tyrant, as explained on the day of Brown's sentencing by abolitionist Wendell Phillips, to whom, along with Thoreau and the young Emerson, Redpath's volume is dedicated:

It is a mistake to call him an insurrectionist. He opposed the authority of the Commonwealth of Virginia. The Commonwealth of Virginia! – there is no such thing. There is no civil society, no government; nor can such exist except on the basis of impartial equal submission of its citizens – by a performance of the duty of rendering justice between God and man. The government that refuses this is none but a pirate ship. Virginia herself is to-day only a chronic insurrection. I mean exactly what I say – I consider well my words – and she is a pirate ship. John Brown sails with letters of marque from God and Justice against every pirate he meets. He has twice as much right to hang Governor Wise as Governor Wise has to hang him.

There were advance orders of at least 20,000. Total sales were over 36,000 copies.

A 3-act play, Ossawatomie Brown; or, The Insurrection at Harper's Ferry, was first performed in New York at the Bowery Theater on December 16, 1859. A Congressional inquest was held, multiple reports from participants and observers were published. The internal telegrams of the Baltimore and Ohio railroad were published. Posters were printed. The literature on Brown and his raid exceeds in quantity that on some American presidents.

According to the New York Independent,

A fissure has suddenly opened at the very foundation of the peculiar institution of the South [slavery], and has disclosed the fact that that institution rests upon a thin crust of lava, which at any moment may yawn asunder and give place to a devouring fire. It is not what John Brown has done or failed to do, but the fearful possibilities that his crazy emeute [commotion, disturbance] has opened to view, which have inspired the South with a terror of coming evil. Foolhardy as was Brown's exploit, regarded merely as a military invasion for the rescue of the oppressed, unjustifiable as it was upon the principles of Christian ethics, yet this singular devotion of an old man to the cause of human freedom, his heroic contempt of his own life, blending with a sacred regard for the lives and property of others, except where these should stand in the way of the deliverance of the oppressed[,] are gradually pervading the public mind with a tone of admiration even for a misguided philanthropy, and startling the South with the idea that a philanthropy which will peril life for its object, is more to be feared than despised.

Subsequently he was eclipsed by the assassination of Abraham Lincoln, but from 1859 to 1865 he was, in the words of Ralph Waldo Emerson, "the most prominent person in the country." Emblem for the North, as Wendell Phillips put it, his self-sacrifice showed by example how important fighting the sin of slavery was. For the South, he was what he had been in pro-slavery Kansas: a traitor to the Constitution, which allegedly protected chattel slavery, and a murderer.

=== Local retaliation by Blacks ===
The barns of all the members of the jury that convicted Brown were burned by slaves. On December 2, 1859, the day of his hanging, "the farm of a ruthless slaveholder killed at Harper's Ferry was burned, and his livestock poisoned by slaves." "Fires were being lighted up all over the county and barns burned, until night after night and sometimes in day there was a conflagration somewhere around Charlestown." "Slaves in Maryland stopped a westbound train, carrying the rebellion into a different county, and five were arrested after trying to organize a horse-and-carriage 'stampede' to freedom." There was a "mass movement of self-liberation" among the slaves of Jefferson County. Barns were burned in Queen Anne's County, Maryland, and letters threatened further violence. Jerry, an enslaved man from nearby Clarke County, Virginia, was in January 1860 convicted of inciting a slave insurrection.

=== Long-term results: outbreak of the Civil War ===
The execution of these prisoners is yet [1901] memorable in Virginia as one of the most impressive exhibitions ever given in the history of the State. It would have been eminently wise for the Virginia governor to have treated Brown and his followers as fanatical [insane] beyond full responsibility to the law, but the ostentatious exhibition of vengeance that came up from Virginia did much to deepen and widen the anti-slavery sentiment of the North. ...[H]e gave his life in such heroic devotion to his cause that the Northern people were impressed far beyond what they themselves had knowledge of.

== Reenactment ==
At the time of the Civil War Centennial, at the request of the Jefferson County Civil War Centennial Committee local author Julia Davis Healy wrote The Anvil about the trial. Its first performance, in 1961, was in the same courtroom, described as "jampacked", in the Jefferson County Courthouse where the trial had taken place. There were 45 actors, most residents of Charles Town. Actual antiques were used; among other things, the man playing Brown was shackled with the handcuffs Brown had worn. Most of the words spoken were almost identical with those said at the trial. The title comes from this line in the text: "At times in history a man appears, pointed like a compass at one star – a man of iron, an anvil on which God beats out his purposes."

The trial was reenacted in 2019 by students from Shenandoah University. A version will be available at Shenandoah Valley Civil War Museum, in Winchester, Virginia.

== Drama ==
- Harpers Ferry, by Barrie Stavis (1967), dramatizes the raid and trial.
- Episode No. 18 ("The Night Raiders") of the CBS (1963-64) television series The Great Adventure shows a dramatization of the raid and subsequent trial.

== See also ==
- Abolitionism in the United States
- John Brown (abolitionist)
- John Brown's last speech
- John Brown's Provisional Constitution
- John Brown's raid on Harpers Ferry
- John Brown's raiders
- Treatment of slaves in the United States
- "Oh we'll hang Jeff Davis from a sour apple tree"
