= George Henry Hoyt =

American politician

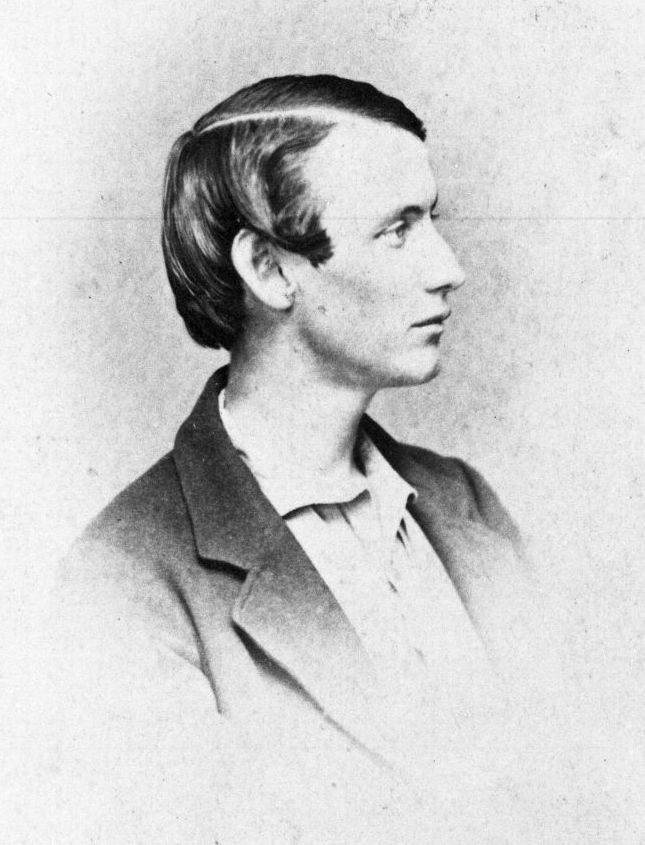
- George H. Hoyt, ca. 1864

6th Kansas Attorney General
- In office January 14, 1867 – January 11, 1869
- Governor: Jerome D. Brumbaugh; Addison Danford
- Preceded by: Jerome D. Brumbaugh
- Succeeded by: Addison Danford

Personal details
- Born: November 25, 1837 Athol, Massachusetts
- Died: February 2, 1877 (aged 39) Athol, Massachusetts
- Party: Republican
- Spouse: Mary Anzonette Cheney
- Profession: Attorney, Union soldier

George Henry Hoyt (November 25, 1837 – February 2, 1877) was an American anti-slavery abolitionist who was attorney for John Brown. During the Civil War, he served as a Union cavalry officer and captain of the Kansas Red Leg scouts, rising to the rank of brevet brigadier general by war's end. Following the war, Hoyt served as the sixth Attorney General of Kansas.

== Early life ==
George Henry Hoyt was born in Athol, Massachusetts, on November 25, 1837, the only surviving son of Athol medical doctor and abolitionist George Hoyt and his wife Avelina Witt Hoyt. In 1851, the Hoyts removed to Boston where George studied law. Lysander Spooner, abolitionist anarchist and good friend of Dr. Hoyt, deeply influenced young George's uncompromising approach to abolition, as did radical orator Wendell Phillips.

== Virginia v. John Brown ==
Following John Brown's Harpers Ferry raid, Hoyt was recruited by Boston abolitionists to volunteer as a counsel to Brown, then on trial in Charles Town, Virginia (since 1863, West Virginia). He arrived at the trial on October 28, 1859, with orders to spy on the proceedings, pass messages to and from Brown, and, most controversially, to arrange a prison break that would free the prisoner and as many of his associates as possible. Because of the large number of soldiers and militia in Charles Town, and because Brown did not want to be rescued and refused to cooperate, Hoyt called off the plot.

When John Brown denounced his court-appointed lawyers on the second day of his trial, both resigned, leaving 21-year-old Hoyt, who had no experience in criminal or Virginia law, as his sole counsel. Two experienced attorneys, Samuel Chilton of Washington, D.C., and Hiram Griswold of Cleveland, Ohio, arrived the next day to take the defense out of Hoyt's inexperienced hands. Following Brown's conviction, Hoyt traveled to Ohio to collect affidavits the defense team hoped would prove Brown insane and thereby avoid his execution. While in Ohio, Hoyt befriended the eldest son of "Old Brown", John Brown Jr., and a large number of "fighting abolitionists" with whom he would later enlist in the Union Army.

== Civil War ==
In late 1861, Hoyt joined John Brown Junior's company of sharpshooters, then being raised in Ohio. Upon the company's arrival in Kansas on November 9, 1861, Hoyt was mustered into Union service as a second lieutenant. Brown's company became Company K of the Seventh Kansas Volunteer Cavalry, also known as Jennison's Jayhawkers. Hoyt joined the staff of Colonel Charles R. Jennison, the two quickly becoming inseparable.

On March 30, 1862, Hoyt married Mary Anzonette Cheney, an Athol girl who traveled to Leavenworth, Kansas, for the wedding. She remained in Kansas for a number of months, but returned to Athol where the couple's first child, George DeWitt Hoyt, was born on Aug 8, 1863. The couple also had a daughter, Mary Clare Hoyt, born May 16, 1868.

On May 27, 1862, Hoyt was elected captain of Company K, replacing Brown, who resigned because of rheumatoid arthritis. After brief service in the Army of the Tennessee, Hoyt resigned his command in July 1863 (effective September 3) due to persistent lung problems. He immediately returned to Kansas.

From late 1862 through August 1863, Hoyt served as "Chief" of an irregular company of scouts and spies known as the Red Leg Scouts. Immortalized by Missouri artist George Caleb Bingham's painting "Order Number 11," and featured in the film "Outlaw Josey Wales," the Red Legs led Union troops on punitive expeditions into Missouri, especially following guerrilla actions like the March 1863 Sam Gaty Massacre. On such raids, Hoyt forcibly freed slaves held by Missourians, regardless of whether the owners held Union or Confederate sympathies. Hoyt's Red Legs received their legal power via commission as detectives in the District of the Border. Hoyt served as the district's Chief Detective until the August 1863 Lawrence Massacre.

In September 1863, Hoyt received a commission as lieutenant colonel in the Kansas Fifteenth Volunteer Cavalry, serving directly under Jennison. Due to anger in Kansas following the massacre, the pair was able to recruit the entire regiment in barely a month. Hoyt served as the regiment's commander, while Jennison was assigned to duty at Fort Leavenworth.

Other than occasional scouts into Missouri in search of guerrillas, Hoyt saw little action until Major General Sterling Price's Confederate forces staged a cavalry raid through Missouri. Hoyt's Fifteenth Kansas was assigned to the Army of the Border under Major General James G. Blunt, where they fought at Second Lexington, Little Blue, and Westport. Hoyt shot and killed guerrilla captain George Todd during the Second Battle of Independence on Oct 21, 1864. At the Second Battle of Newtonia, Hoyt earned a brevet promotion to Brigadier General. Hoyt resigned his commission on July 19, 1865.

== Postwar ==
Following the war, Hoyt served a two-year term as Attorney General of Kansas from January 14, 1867, to January 11, 1869. After brief stints as a United States Postal Agent and editor of two newspapers in Leavenworth, Hoyt ran for Congress as the Representative from Kansas. After his unsuccessful campaign, Hoyt returned to Athol and edited the Athol Transcript. He was elected to the Massachusetts House of Representatives in 1871, where he led to legislature to censure long-time Massachusetts Senator Charles Sumner for introducing a resolution that Civil War battle names should not appear as "battle honors" on the regimental flags of the U.S. Army. The censure was rescinded in 1874. Hoyt died in Athol on February 2, 1877, aged 39.

== See also ==
- 1872 Massachusetts legislature
- 1873 Massachusetts legislature
