= John Brown's Provisional Constitution =

1858 document by the American abolitionist

Hundreds of copies of a provisional constitution were found among John Brown's papers after his 1859 raid on Harper's Ferry, Virginia. It called for a new state in the Appalachian Mountains, a sort of West Virginia, populated by volunteer freedom fighters and escaped slaves from plantations, which were at lower altitudes. It was introduced into evidence at his trial as evidence of sedition.

John Brown also wrote, at about the same time, a little-known Declaration of Liberty, inspired by the U.S. Declaration of Independence.

== Creation of the constitution ==
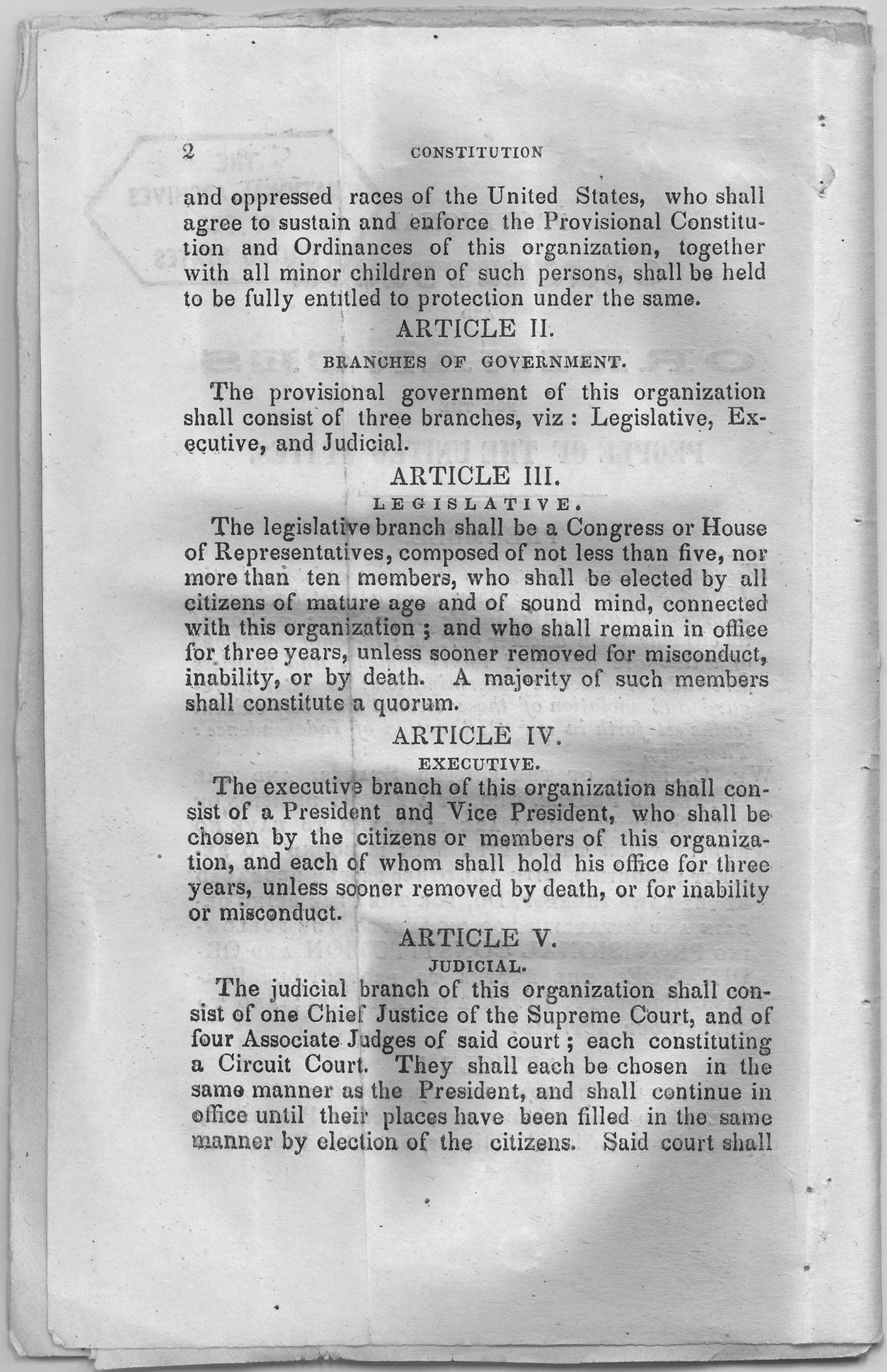
Page from John Brown's Provisional Constitution and Ordinances for the People of the United States.

The Provisional Constitution and Ordinances for the People of the United States was written by Brown while a guest in Frederick Douglass's house in Rochester, New York, in February, 1858. He later described it as "of my own contriving and getting up". This constitution was adopted at a convention Brown held in Chatham, Ontario, Canada, on May 8–10, 1858.

Although this document was dismissed by contemporaries as evidence of Brown's madness, David Reynolds points out that at the time, the U.S. Constitution itself was "a highly contested text". The current constitution was rejected by the abolitionists Wm. Lloyd Garrison and Wendell Phillips, who called it "a covenant with death and an agreement from hell" because it indirectly sanctioned slavery, as the Dred Scott decision had just confirmed.

== Projected use of the Constitution ==
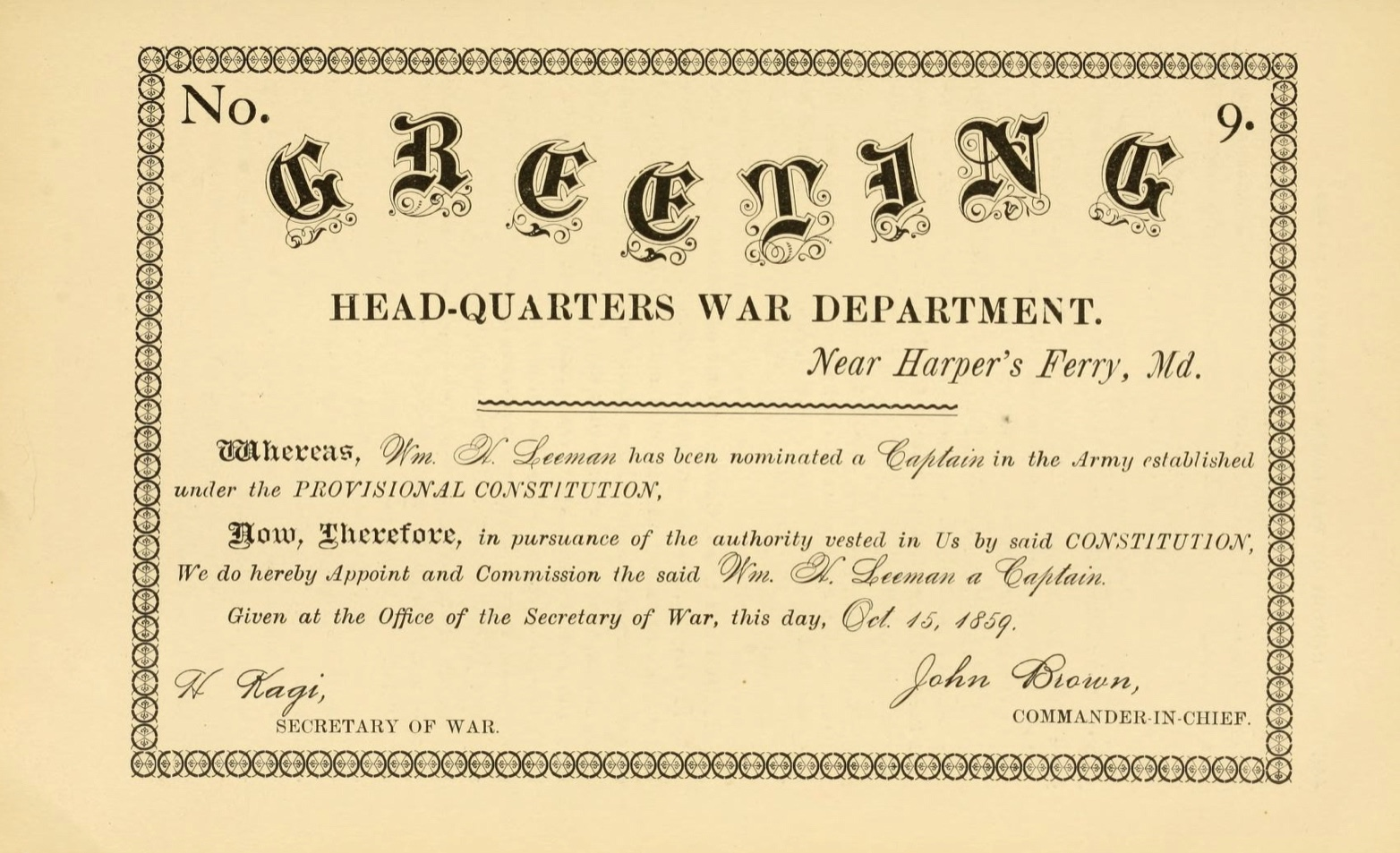
Certificate naming Wm. Leeman a captain in John Brown's army

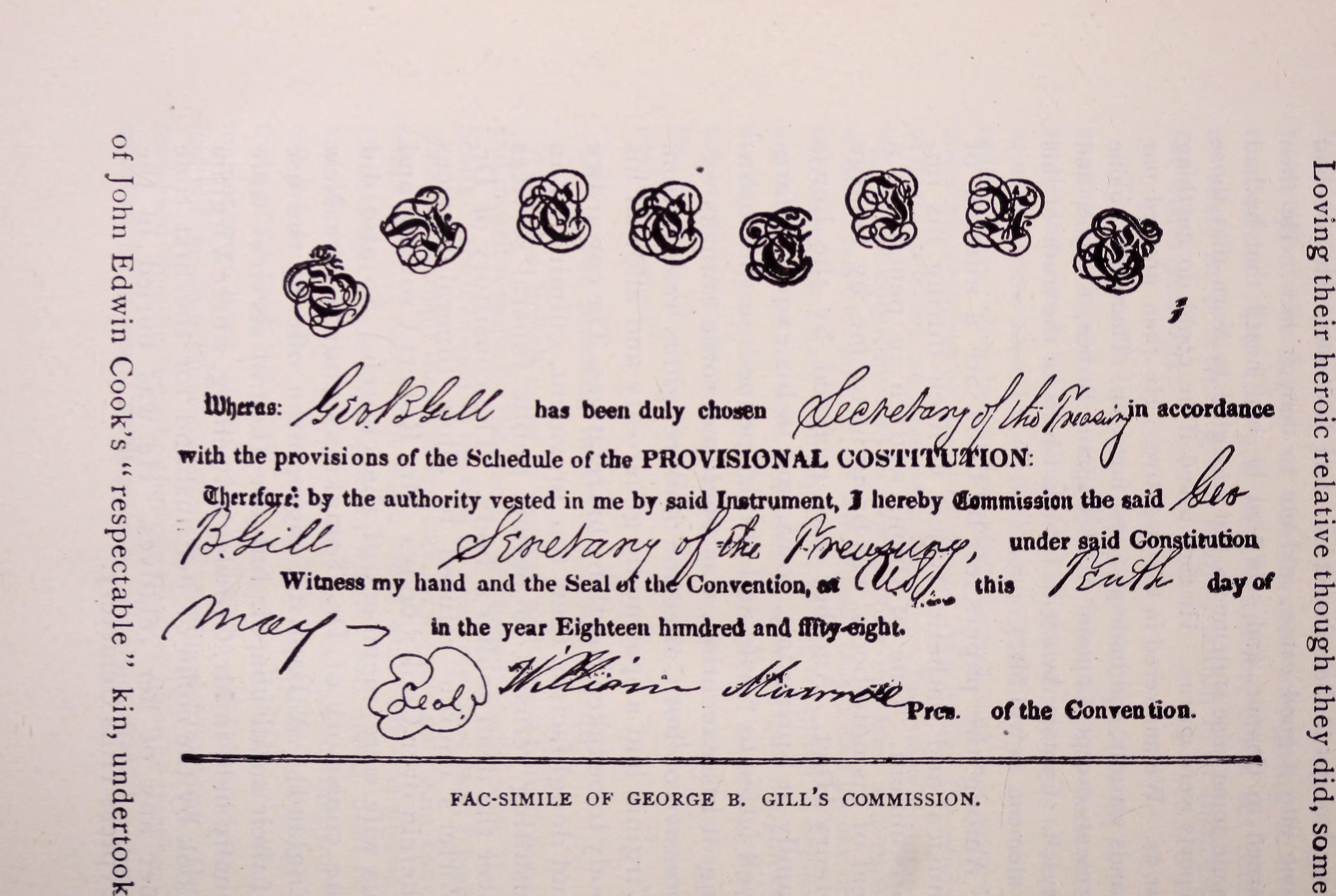
Certificate naming George B. Gill Secretary of the Treasury

Just what the provisional constitution was intended for is not completely clear. It was not distributed in Harpers Ferry. There is no record of any comments by Brown on how and when it was to be distributed and used. "John Brown never...communicated his whole plan, even to his immediate followers. ...With characteristic reticence Brown revealed his whole plan to no one, and many of those close to him received quite different impressions, or rather read their own ideas into Brown's careful speech." Brown's planned raid on Harpers Ferry was laid out at the Chatham Convention, held in Chatham, Ontario, Canada, in 1858. The convention of mostly black delegates also adopted the measures of Brown's Provisional Constitution.

Printed certificates named the following as officers under the Provisional Constitution:

- John Brown, Commander in Chief
- John Henry Kagi, Secretary of War
- George B. Gill, Secretary of the Treasury (reproduced at right)
- Jeremiah G. Anderson, named Captain, October 1, 1859
- William H. Leeman, named Captain, October 15, 1859 (reproduced at right)

It was not the constitution of a projected new state, for that it was made up of the mountainous regions of the mid-Atlantic states, that would join or seek to join the Union. He also denied, during his trial, the intent of revolting against the United States, of creating a new country. Sometimes he seems to want the same United States—he does describe it in the constitution's title as "for the people of the United States"—but with a better and anti-slavery constitution. This proposed one was only "provisional", which implies some sort of procedure to create a new, permanent constitution.

Under Brown's provisional constitution, there would be a unicameral legislature of no less than 5 nor more than 10 members, all chosen at large. There would be no senate.

Brown did not see setting up another government with a different constitution to be a revolt against the United States.

The Provisional Constitution was cited during the trial as evidence of his intent to commit treason.

Not one of the copies was ever distributed; even nearby enslaved persons did not receive copies. The reason for this has never been explained. Although it was reprinted, always with scorn, in the press, Brown was not asked about it by any of the many visitors he saw during the month (November 2–December 2, 1859) between being sentenced to death (in Virginia v. John Brown) and his execution.

Much of the Constitution was reprinted in many newspapers, such as the Wheeling Daily Intelligencer, shortly after his arrest.

In the pockets of William H. Leeman, one of the rebels killed at Harpers Ferry, was found a commission as captain "in the army established under the provisional constitution". It was signed by John Brown, Commander in Chief, at the "War Department, near Harpers Ferry", dated October 15. The commission was a preprinted form, with Leeman's name filled in by hand.
