= John Brown's last speech =

1859 speech by American abolitionist leader John Brown

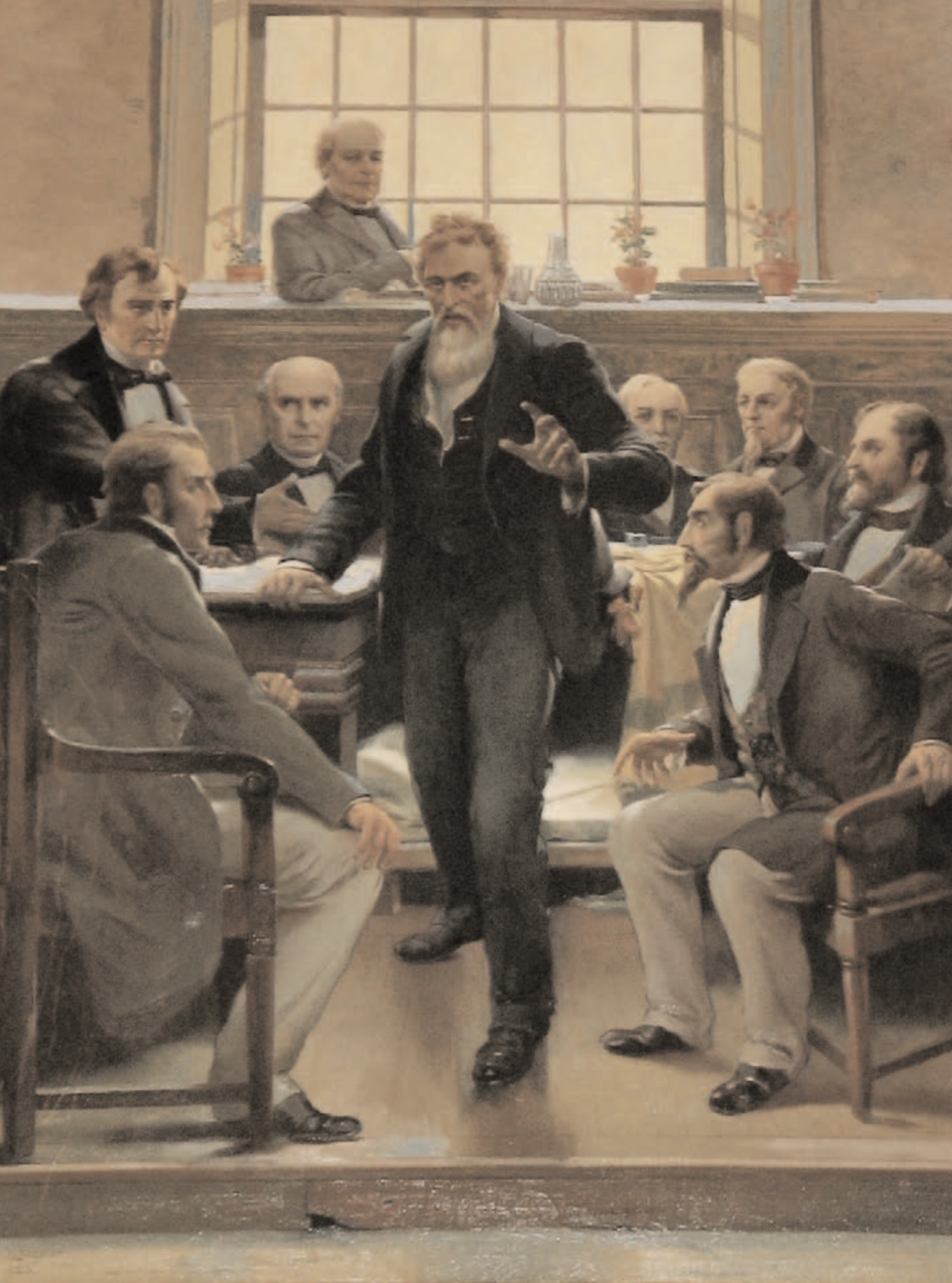
Brown arises from his cot, holds a table for support, and addresses the public. Standing at back is prosecutor Andrew Hunter. "John Brown's Trial at Charlestown, Va.", by David C. Lithgow, 1923. Essex County Courthouse, Elizabethtown, New York

John Brown's last speech, so-called by his first biographer, James Redpath, was delivered on November 2, 1859. John Brown was being sentenced in a courtroom packed with whites in Charles Town, Virginia, after his conviction for murder, treason against the Commonwealth of Virginia, and inciting a slave insurrection. According to Ralph Waldo Emerson, the speech's only equal in American oratory was the Gettysburg Address; the modern-day American Bar Association ranks it as one of the famous spoken allocutions of American history.

As was his custom, Brown spoke without notes. Transcribed by a phonographer (reporter-stenographer), which newspapers used for important speeches, it was on the next day's front page of countless newspapers nationwide, including The New York Times.

The American Anti-Slavery Society then predicted that his execution would begin his martyrdom, or that potential clemency would remove "so much capital [...] out of the abolition sails".

== Content ==
Virginia court procedure required that defendants found guilty should be asked if there was any reason the sentence should not be imposed. Asked this by the clerk, Brown immediately rose, and in a clear, distinct voice said this:

I have, may it please the court, a few words to say.

In the first place, I deny everything but what I have all along admitted, the design on my part to free the slaves. I intended certainly to have made a clean thing of that matter, as I did last winter, when I went into Missouri and there took slaves without the snapping of a gun on either side, moved them through the country, and finally left them in Canada. I designed to have done the same thing again, on a larger scale. That was all I intended. I never did intend murder, or treason, or the destruction of property, or to excite or incite slaves to rebellion, or to make insurrection.

I have another objection; and that is, it is unjust that I should suffer such a penalty. Had I interfered in the manner which I admit, and which I admit has been fairly proved (for I admire the truthfulness and candor of the greater portion of the witnesses who have testified in this case), had I so interfered in behalf of the rich, the powerful, the intelligent, the so-called great, or in behalf of any of their friends, either father, mother, brother, sister, wife, or children, or any of that class, and suffered and sacrificed what I have in this interference, it would have been all right; and every man in this court would have deemed it an act worthy of reward rather than punishment.

This court acknowledges, as I suppose, the validity of the law of God. I see a book kissed here which I suppose to be the Bible, or at least the New Testament. That teaches me that "all things whatsoever I would that men should do to me, I should do even so to them" [Matthew 7:12]. It teaches me, further, to "remember them that are in bonds, as bound with them" [Hebrews 13:3]. I endeavored to act up to that instruction. I say, I am yet too young to understand that God is any respecter of persons. I believe that to have interfered as I have done as I have always freely admitted I have done in behalf of His despised poor, was not wrong, but right. Now, if it is deemed necessary that I should forfeit my life for the furtherance of the ends of justice, and mingle my blood further with the blood of my children and with the blood of millions in this slave country whose rights are disregarded by wicked, cruel, and unjust enactments, I submit; so let it be done!

Let me say one word further.

I feel entirely satisfied with the treatment I have received on my trial. Considering all the circumstances, it has been more generous than I expected. But I feel no consciousness of guilt. I have stated from the first what was my intention and what was not. I never had any design against the life of any person, nor any disposition to commit treason, or excite slaves to rebel, or make any general insurrection. I never encouraged any man to do so, but always discouraged any idea of that kind.

Let me say, also, a word in regard to the statements made by some of those connected with me. I hear it has been stated by some of them that I have induced them to join me. But the contrary is true. I do not say this to injure them, but as regretting their weakness. There is not one of them but joined me of his own accord, and the greater part of them at their own expense. A number of them I never saw, and never had a word of conversation with, till the day they came to me; and that was for the purpose I have stated.

Now I have done.

== Courtroom reaction ==
While Brown was speaking, there was "perfect quiet" in the courtroom. Under Virginia law, one month must elapse between a death sentence and its execution, so the judge, Richard Parker, then sentenced Brown to be hanged one month later, on December 2, and specified that, for the sake of example, the execution would be more public than usual.

The courtroom continued silence after the reading of the death sentence. "One indecent fellow, behind the Judge's chair, shouted and clapped hands jubilantly; but he was indignantly checked, and in a manner that induced him to believe that he would do best to retire." "This undecorum was promptly suppressed and much regret was expressed by citizens at its occurrence."

== Publication of the speech ==
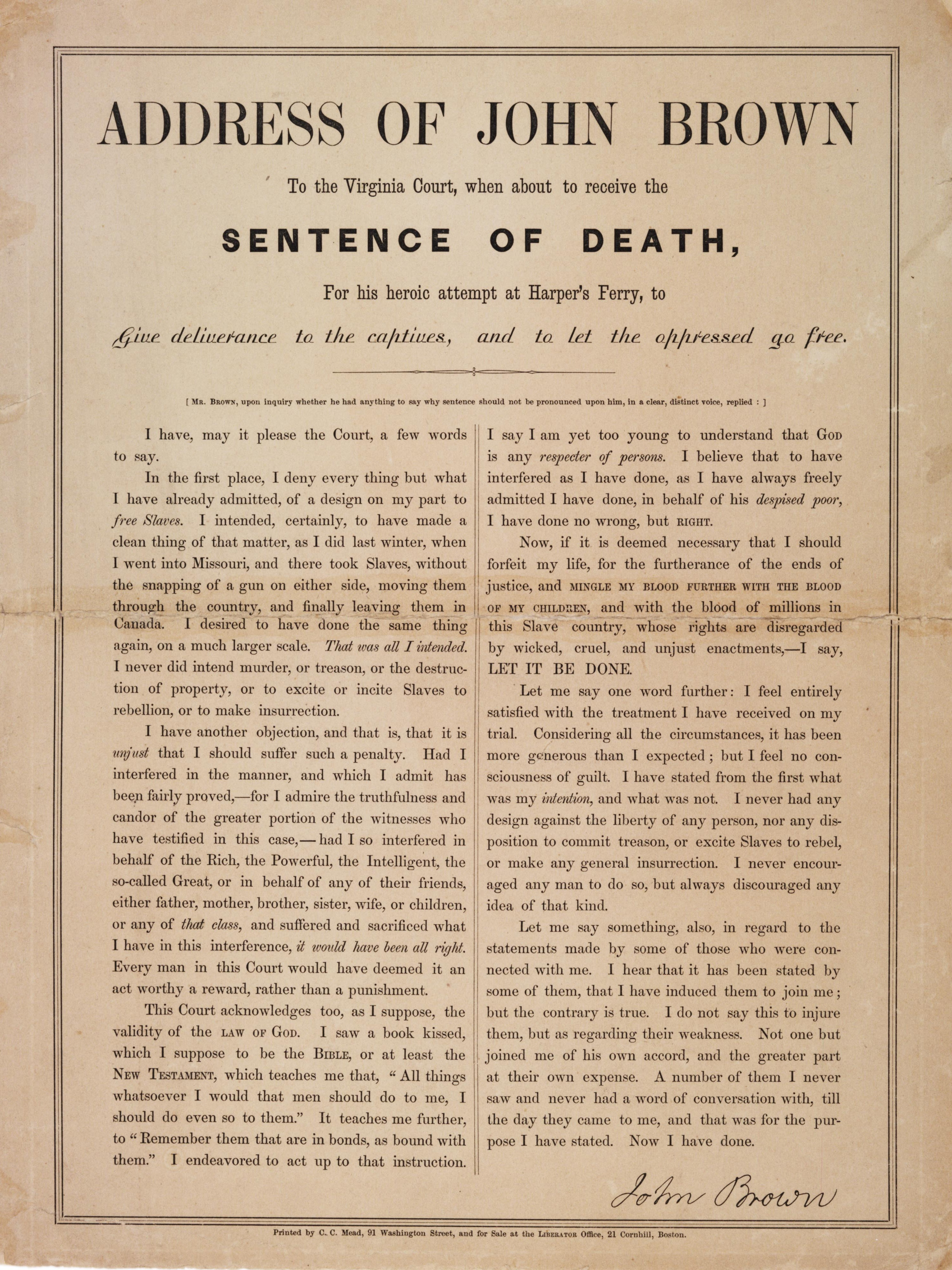
Poster (broadside) of John Brown's last speech, published by Wm. Lloyd Garrison

There were multiple reporters covering Brown's trial. Thanks to the recently invented telegraph, they sent out immediate copy. Brown's speech was distributed by the Associated Press and was the next day, November 3, on the front page of the New York Times, the Richmond Dispatch, the Detroit Free Press, the Milwaukee Daily Sentinel, and other newspapers. Over the next few days, the full text appeared in approximately 50 other papers across the country. William Lloyd Garrison printed it broadside as a poster and sold it in the Liberator's office in Boston. The American Anti-Slavery Society published it in a pamphlet, with extracts from Brown's letters. A verse on the title page, "He, being dead, yet speaketh" (Hebrews 11:4), compares Brown with Abel, killed by Cain.

Newspapers which printed Brown's speech in full

The cross † indicates that the speech appears on page 1.
The asterisk * indicates that the speech is accompanied by discussion or other related news.

- Free states
  - Connecticut
    - East Haddam Journal, November 5
  - Illinois
    - Chicago Tribune, November 3
  - Indiana
    - *Belvidere Standard, November 8
    - †*Dawson's Fort Wayne Weekly Times, November 5
    - *Evansville Daily Evening Inquirer, November 3
    - *Evansville Daily Journal, November 3
    - *Indiana Daily State Sentinel, November 5
    - †*Seymour Times, November 10
    - *Sullivan Democrat, November 10
    - *Terre Haute Wabash Express, November 9
    - Weekly Vincennes Western Sun, November 4
  - Iowa
    - Muscatine Evening Journal, November 4,
  - Kansas
    - *Elwood Free Press, November 5
    - †*Kansas Herald of Freedom, November 12
  - Massachusetts
    - Fall River Daily Evening News, November 3
    - *The Liberator, November 4
  - Michigan
    - *Cass County Republican, November 10
    - †*Detroit Free Press, November 3
  - New York
    - *Douglass' Monthly, November
    - *Frank Leslie's Illustrated Newspaper, November 12
    - †*The New York Times, November 3
    - *Rensselaer Gazette, November 9
  - Ohio
    - *Ashtabula Weekly Telegraph, November 5
    - *Pomeroy Weekly Telegraph, November 8
    - *Summit County Beacon, November 9
    - Western Reserve Chronicle, November 9
  - Pennsylvania
    - Bradford Reporter, November 10
    - *Carlisle Weekly Herald, November 8
    - *Erie Observer, November 10
    - *Lancaster Examiner and Herald, November 9
    - *Montrose Independent Republican, November 7
    - *National Anti-Slavery Standard, November 6
    - *Raftsman's Journal, November 9
    - *Towanda Bradford Reporter, November 10
  - Rhode Island
    - *Bristol Phenix, November 5
  - Vermont
    - *Aurora of the Valley, November 12
    - *Montpelier Green Mountain Freeman, November 10
    - *The St. Johnsbury Caledonian, November 12
    - *Vermont Journal, November 12
  - Wisconsin
    - *Grant County Witness, November 10
    - *Janesville Daily Gazette, November 4
    - *Milwaukee Daily Sentinel, November 3
    - *Wausau Daily Wisconsin, November 10
    - *Weekly Gazette and Free Press, November 11
- Slave states
  - District of Columbia
    - *National Era, November 10
  - Georgia
    - *Athens Southern Banner, November 10
  - North Carolina
    - Fayetteville Observer, November 7
    - *The Greensboro Times, November 12
    - Wilmington Daily Herald, November 4
  - Virginia
    - †*Richmond Dispatch, November 4
    - *Shepherdstown Register, November 5
    - Wheeling Daily Intelligencer, November 3
- Foreign
  - England
    - *Illustrated Times (London), November 26

== Immediate reactions ==
=== Supporting Brown ===
In the evening of December 1, as many of the papers reported together with Brown's speech, the abolitionist Wendell Phillips gave a speech in Brooklyn, in Henry Ward Beecher's Plymouth Church, an important abolitionist center and Underground Railroad station. Though the talk had been scheduled in advance, on "The Lesson of the Hour", the topic of John Brown had not been announced and was a surprise to those present. According to Phillips, in the lead story on page 1 of the New York Herald:

It is a mistake to call him an insurrectionist. He opposed the authority of the Commonwealth of Virginia. The Commonwealth of Virginia!—there is no such thing. There is no civil society, no government; nor can such exist except on the basis of impartial equal submission of its citizens—by a performance of the duty of rendering justice between God and man. The government that refuses this is none but a pirate ship. Virginia herself is to-day only a chronic insurrection. I mean exactly what I say—I consider well my words—and she is a pirate ship. John Brown sails with letters of marque from God and Justice against every pirate he meets. He has twice as much right to hang Governor Wise as Governor Wise has to hang him.

Frederick Douglass, having escaped to Canada from a Virginia warrant, also referred to "the thing calling itself the Government of Virginia, but which in fact is but an organized conspiracy by one party of the people against the other and weaker".

On November 1, in Boston, the executive committee of the American Anti-Slavery Society resolved to observe "that tragical event" of Brown's forthcoming execution. The yet undefined action of observation would be "the first step towards making Brown a Martyr, but should Governor Wise see fit to reprieve him, so much capital will be taken out of the abolition sails".

=== Hostile to Brown ===
==== Andrew Hunter, the Prosecuting Attorney ====
The prosecuting attorney, Andrew Hunter, published 30 years later his recollections of the speech:

When called upon and asked whether he had anything to say why sentence should not be executed according to the verdict of the jury, he rose and made a formal and evidently well considered speech, in which, to my great surprise, he declared that his purpose in coming here was not to arm the slaves against their masters and incite an insurrection, but it was simply to do on a larger scale what he had done in Kansas; to run them off, so as to secure their freedom, into the free states. The speech was evidently a well considered one and was slowly and deliberately delivered. At the close of it sentence was pronounced, and he was remanded to jail. The speech was published immediately afterward in many papers. Gov. Wise came on to Charlestown not long after it made its appearance, and mentioned to me his great surprise to have read such a speech coming from Capt. Brown (John's father), and thereupon he went to the jail to visit Brown.

==== Rev. Samuel Leech ====
In his firsthand account written and published 50 years later, Leech stated the following. "Brown's statement was not exactly sustained by the facts. Why had he collected the Sharpe's rifles, the pikes, the kegs of powder, many thousands of caps and much war-like material at the Kennedy farm? Why did he and other armed men break into the United States Armory and Arsenal, make portholes in the engine house, shoot and kill citizens, and surround their own imprisoned persons with prominent men as hostages? But everybody in the court house believed the old man when he said that he did everything with a solitary motive, the liberation of the slaves."

== Modern commentary ==
Modern critics have challenged the veracity of John Brown's framing of events; Alfred Kazin called it Brown's "great, lying speech". Brown's biographer David S. Reynolds claims, "The Gettysburg Address similarly glossed over disturbing details in the interest of making a higher point. Lincoln left out the bloody horrors of the Civil War, just as Brown minimized his bloody tactics."

Also according to Reynolds, with this speech, both North and South stopped seeing Brown as only an irritating extremist. It was clear that he was a Christian and an American. The South scrambled to denounce him as simply a villain. The North began to regard him as a hero.

== See also ==
- Last words
