= Edward Howard House =

American journalist (1836–1901)

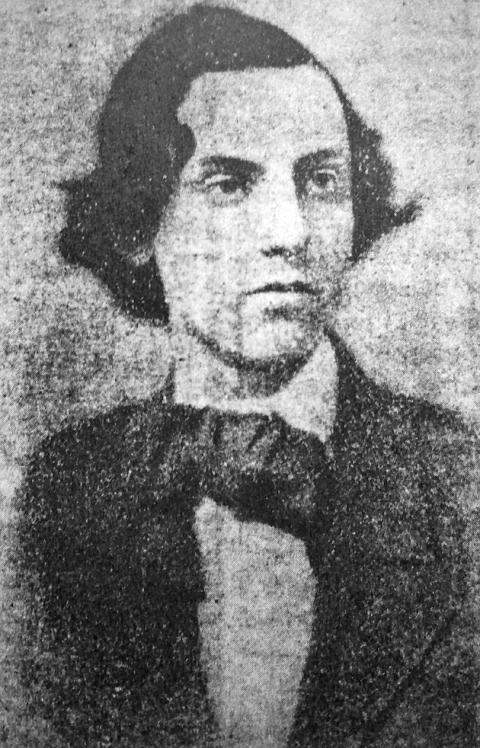
Edward Howard House

Edward Howard House (October 5, 1836 – December 18, 1901) was an American journalist who wrote for the New York Tribune and later founded the Japan-based English-language newspaper Tokio Times.

== Career ==
He was born in Boston to engraver Timothy House and his wife, a pianist. House composed an orchestral piece at the age of fourteen, and four years later began writing for the Boston Courier as the publication's music and drama critic. House also worked as a banknote engraver. In 1858, he left the Courier for Horace Greeley's New York Tribune. In 1859, he reported for the Tribune, under an assumed name, with phony credentials, and at considerable personal risk, on John Brown's trial, Virginia v. John Brown, in Charles Town, Virginia.

In 1870, the Tribune sent House to cover Japan. While there, he also contributed to The New York Times, The Atlantic, and Harper's Magazine. Besides his writing, House taught at what became the University of Tokyo. He was the only foreign journalist attached to Japanese forces in the Taiwan Expedition of 1874. Three years after the expedition, House established the Tokio Times. His own publication only lasted three years, as he returned to the United States in 1880. By 1882, House had again settled in Japan, working for Frank Brinkley's Japan Mail and resuming his teaching post at the University of Tokyo. He lived in the United States from 1885 to 1893 to be treated for severe gout. That year, House moved to Kōjimachi, Tokyo, and continued writing for the Mail, focusing on the topic of music. In 1898, House was named the director of the Imperial Court Orchestra. Emperor Meiji awarded him an Order of the Sacred Treasure, second class shortly before House's death on December 18, 1901. House's funeral was held three days after his death. He was cremated in Meguro and interred at Yanaka cemetery.
