= Hiram Griswold =

American politician and lawyer (1807–1881)

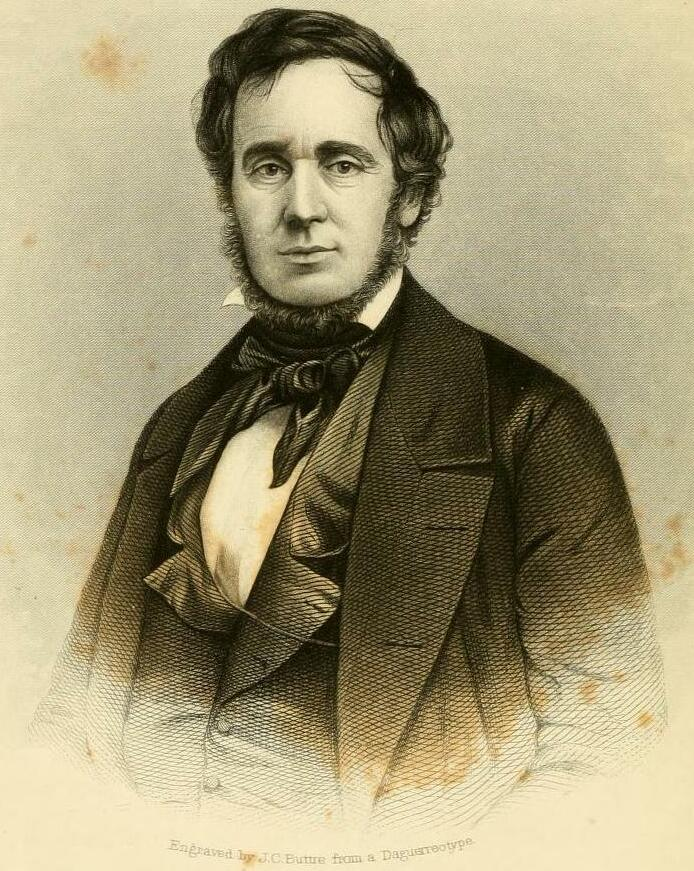
- Griswold in 1853 publication

Member of the Ohio Senate from the 25th district
- In office 1856–1858
- Preceded by: John S. Foote
- Succeeded by: William Slade Jr.

Personal details
- Born: July 5, 1807 Colebrook, Connecticut, U.S.
- Died: October 11, 1881 (aged 74) Leavenworth, Kansas, U.S.
- Resting place: Mount Muncie Cemetery
- Party: Whig
- Spouse: Eleanor Ann Gordon (m. 1832, died)
- Occupation: Politician; lawyer
- Known for: defense lawyer of John Brown
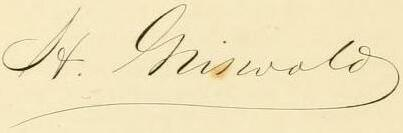
- Signature

Hiram Griswold (July 5, 1807 – October 11, 1881) was an American politician and lawyer from Ohio. He served as a member of the Ohio Senate from 1856 to 1858. In 1859, he was one of the lawyers defending John Brown of the Harpers Ferry raid in Virginia v. John Brown.

== Early life ==
Hiram Griswold was born on July 5, 1807, in Colebrook, Connecticut, to Roswell Griswold. His father was a farmer in Litchfield County. He attended local schools. He attended teaching school for six months in Greene County, New York.

In 1826, Griswold moved to Hudson, Ohio. He studied languages under Reverend William Hanford and Western Reserve Academy. In 1827, he studied law under Van R. Humphrey. While reading law, he taught at a school in Hudson. He was then admitted to the bar.

== Career ==
In August 1829, Griswold moved to Canton and started to practice law. Around 1831, he declined an invitation to partner with Gregory Powers Jr. of Portage County.

In 1836, Griswold ran for the Ohio Senate as a Whig, but was defeated by David A. Starkweather. In 1844, he was appointed as a body reporter of the supreme court. He was later elected and served a second term, until June 1851. In 1846, he ran again for the Ohio Senate, but was defeated.

In 1848, Griswold ran for the U.S. Senate as a Whig, but lost. In 1850, he ran for the Ohio House of Representatives, but was defeated. In 1851, he ran as a Whig for the U.S. Senate, but ultimately withdrew.

In December 1851, Griswold moved to Cleveland. After moving, he also had a law office in Canton with partner Isaac Hazlett. He was a member of the Ohio Senate, representing the 25th district, from 1856 to 1858. In 1859, he defended John Brown of the Harpers Ferry raid in Virginia v. John Brown.

Chief Justice Salmon P. Chase appointed Griswold as register in bankruptcy of Kansas.

== Personal life ==
Griswold married Eleanor Ann Gordon, daughter of John Gordon of Baltimore, in 1832. She later died. He remarried.

Griswold and his wife were Presbyterians. He purchased the Fogle mansion at 708 North Market Street in Canton after William Fogle Sr.'s death. He sold it to John Laird. In Cleveland, he lived on Euclid Avenue. In 1863, he lost his home due to an issue with the title. His family then moved to Leavenworth, Kansas. He lived on Osage Street in Leavenworth.

Griswold died on October 11, 1881, at his home in Leavenworth. He was buried at Mount Muncie Cemetery.
