= Samuel Chilton =

American politician

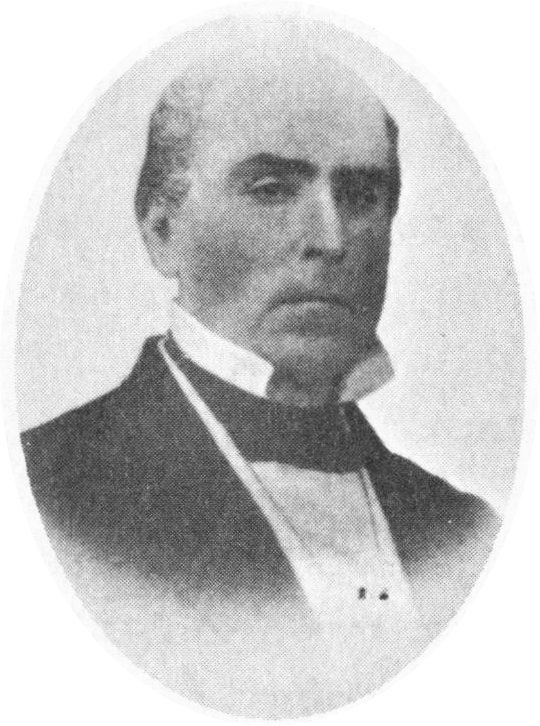
- Born: September 7, 1804; Fauquier County, Virginia, US
- Died: January 14, 1867 (aged 62); Warrenton, Virginia, US
- Occupations: Politician, lawyer
- Spouse: Isabella R. Brooke (m. 1832)
- Children: 5

Samuel Chilton (September 7, 1804 – January 14, 1867) was a 19th-century politician and lawyer from Virginia.

== Biography ==
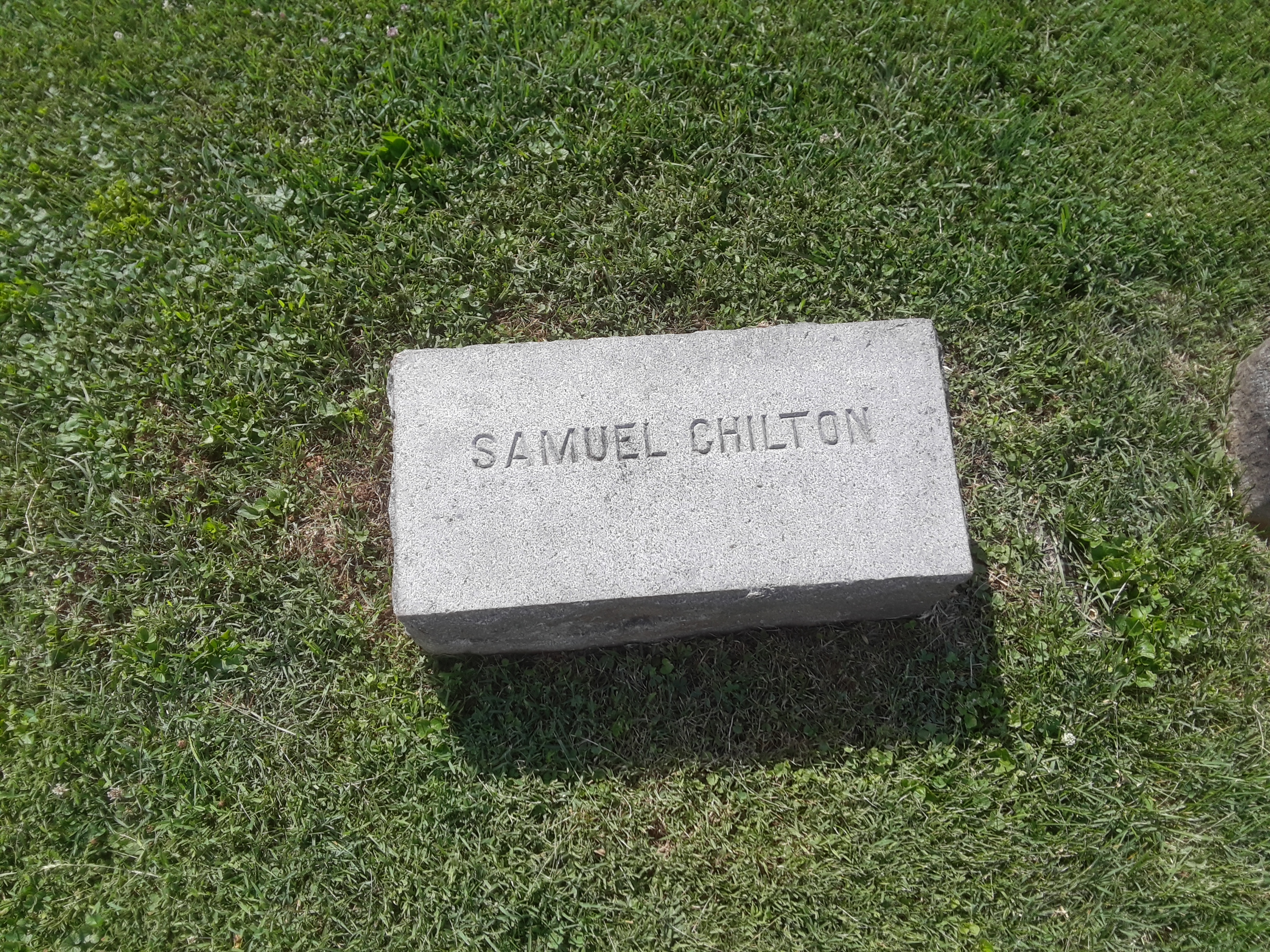
Chilton's grave in the family plot at Warrenton Cemetery.

Born in Warrenton, Virginia, Chilton moved to Missouri with his family as a child and attended private school there. He studied law and was admitted to the bar in 1826, commencing practice back in Warrenton. He got involved in politics and was elected a Whig to the United States House of Representatives in 1842 when he narrowly defeated William "Extra Billy" Smith following a redistricting. Chilton served one term from 1843 to 1845, during which he advocated abolishing imprisonment for debt. Afterward, he returned to practicing law and was a delegate to the Virginia Constitutional Convention from 1850 to 1851. At the convention he proposed a key compromise on legislative apportionment.

Chilton moved to Washington, D.C., by 1853 and became a member of American Party, or Know-Nothings. Despite having owned slaves, in 1859 he was appointed as a defense attorney for abolitionist John Brown after his previous defense attorneys advocated that the defendant advance a plea of insanity as his defense.

Chilton died in Warrenton on January 14, 1867, and was interred there at Warrenton Cemetery.

== Sources ==
- John T. Kneebone et al., eds., Dictionary of Virginia Biography (Richmond: The Library of Virginia, 1998- ), 3:217-218. ISBN 0-88490-206-4.
- Death date in obituary, Warrenton True Index, 12, January 19, 1867.

U.S. House of Representatives
Preceded by William "Extra Billy" Smith	Member of the U.S. House of Representatives from Virginia's 9th congressional district March 4, 1843 – March 3, 1845	Succeeded by John Pendleton
