= John Brown's raiders =

Group of abolitionists who raided a federal arsenal at Harpers Ferry, Virginia, US

- Military leader: John Brown
- Dissolved: 1859
- Ideology: Abolitionism; Civil rights
- Wars: John Brown's raid on Harpers Ferry

On Sunday night, October 16, 1859, the abolitionist John Brown led a band of 22 in a raid on the federal arsenal at Harpers Ferry, Virginia (since 1863, West Virginia).

== Composition of the group ==
The group of men varied in social class and education.

It would be hard to find again such a strange party as that which upheld John Brown in his daring expedition. Hopeful because they were brave, and brave with the surety of right on their side, they came together with the wide difference in character and education, and were held together by their love for liberty. Some of them could claim only the refinement of this love while others were fitted for any position of honor that could be given them.

— "John Brown Raiders", Telegraph-Forum, January 4, 1873

They had come from all over the country and Canada, and were from diverse social classes, from fugitive slaves to the upper middle class. John Brown was 59, Dangerfield Newby was 44, and Owen Brown was 35. All the rest were under 30. Oliver Brown, Barclay Coppoc, and William H. Leeman were under 21.

Of the members of Brown's party, 17 were white and 5 (23%) were black. Of the five black people, two (Leary, Newby) died during the raid, two (Copeland and Green) were tried and executed, and one (Osborne Anderson) escaped. Two (Green and Newby) had been enslaved, with Newby having been granted his freedom and Green a fugitive; three (Osborne Anderson, Copeland, and Leary) were free black people, but Copeland was a fugitive from the charge of participating in the 1858 Oberlin-Wellington Rescue, of which he was a leader.

Three of Brown's sons participated in the raid. Two, Oliver and Watson, were shot on Monday at the engine house; Oliver died after a few hours in agony, but Watson not until early Wednesday morning. Owen Brown escaped and became an officer in the Union Army. Watson's body was recovered in 1882; Oliver's not until 1899. Salmon Brown, though he had been with his father and brothers in Kansas, did not want to participate in the Harpers Ferry raid and remained in North Elba, running the farm. John Jr. and Jason also declined to participate.

All but 5, who successfully escaped north, were either killed during the raid, or captured, tried, and executed. Of the 22,

- 10 were killed during the raid or died shortly after of their wounds (Jerry Anderson, Oliver Brown, Watson Brown, Kagi, Leary, Leeman, Newby, Taylor, Adolphus Thompson, William Thompson)
- 7 were tried and executed, 5 who were taken prisoner on the spot (John Brown, Cook, Copeland, Edwin Coppock, Green) plus 2 who escaped but were captured (Hazlitt, Stevens)
- 5 escaped north and were not captured (Osborne Anderson, Owen Brown, Barclay Coppock, Meriam, Tidd).

== Raiders ==
The men who participated in the raid are made up of two groups, depending whether or not they fought with Brown in Kansas.

As of 2012, there had never been a book on any of Brown's raiders. Three appeared in quick succession: 2012 on John E. Cook, 2015 on John Anthony Copeland, and in 2020 on Shields Green, plus a 2018 book on Brown's five black raiders, Five for Freedom: the African American Soldiers in John Brown's Army.

=== Fought with Brown in Kansas ===
A group that fought with him in Kansas and gathered at Springdale, Iowa, to prepare and drill for the raid,

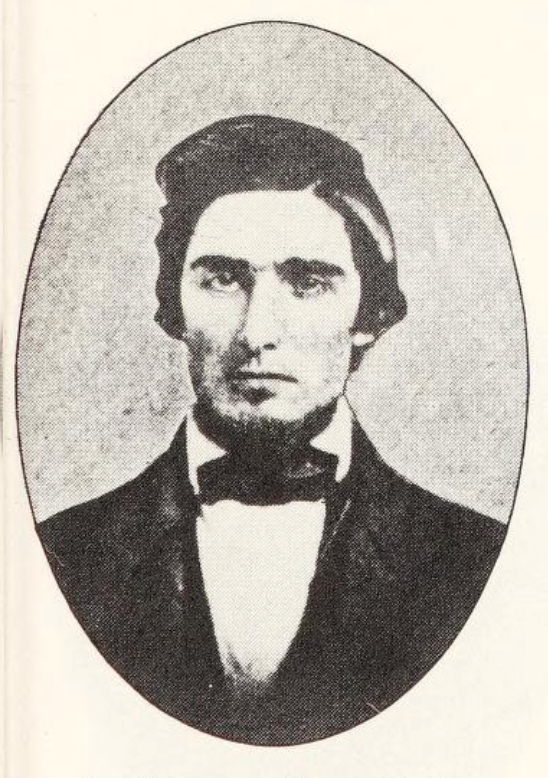
Jeremiah Goldsmith Anderson

‡ Jeremiah Goldsmith Anderson, 26, born in Indiana, served with Brown in Kansas. Brown was "attended, generally, in his movements about the city [Boston] and its neighborhood, by a faithful henchman, Jerry Anderson." He was killed by a Marine's bayonet during the final assault on the engine house. He had in his pocket a letter from his brother John J. (or G. or Q.) Anderson, of Chillicothe, Ohio. His body was taken by Winchester Medical College; last resting place unknown.

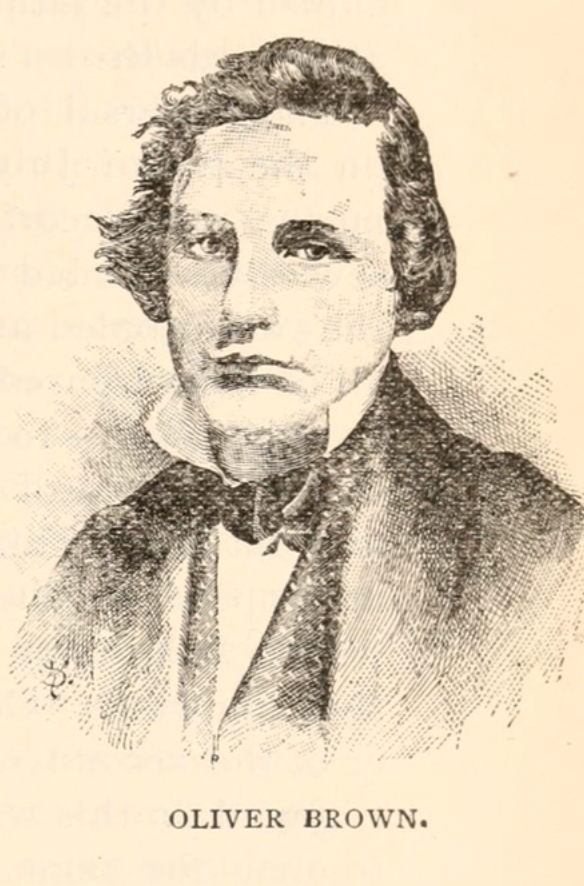
Oliver Brown

† Oliver Brown, 20, John Brown's son, served in Kansas, and he was mortally wounded during the raid Oliver, the youngest of John Brown's three sons to participate in the action. He was described by his mother as the child "most like his father, caring most for learning of all our children." He was mortally wounded on the 17th inside the engine house, and died beside his father. First buried in one of two unmarked boxes near Harpers Ferry; re-interred in 1899 in a common coffin in North Elba.

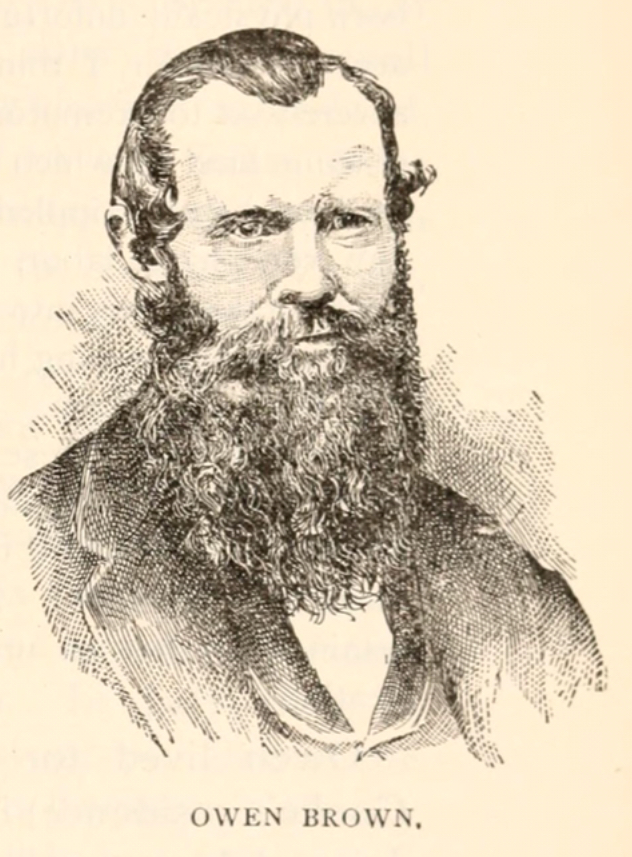
Owen Brown

Owen Brown, about 35, John Brown's son, fought in Kansas. He escaped the raid. Owen, one of three of Brown's sons to participate in the raid, was the last surviving raider following the death of Osborn P. Anderson in 1873. He died of pneumonia in 1889.

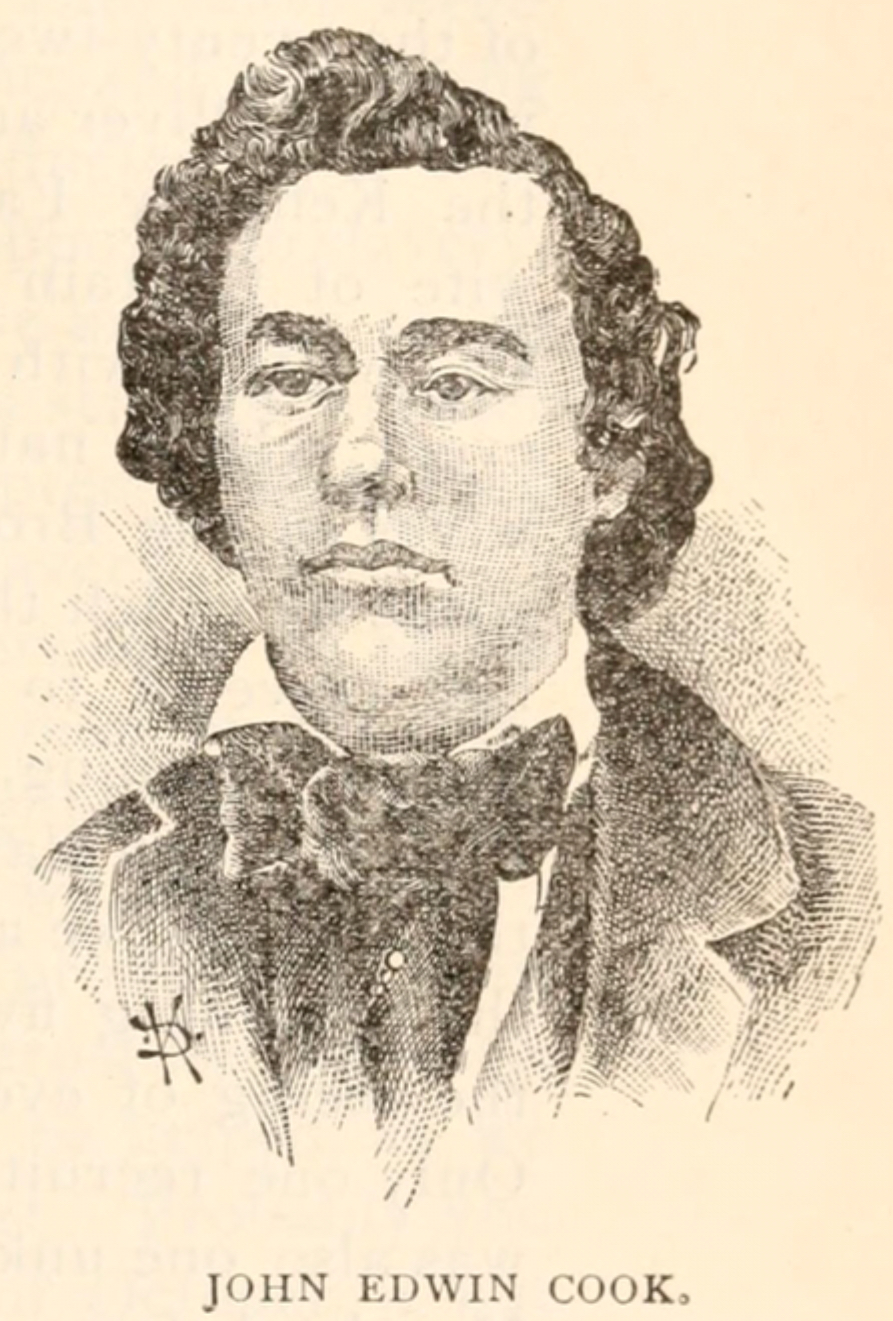
John Edwin Cook

John Edwin Cook, 29, reformer and former soldier, attended Oberlin College, he initially escaped capture, but was found and hanged December 16, 1859. He is buried in Green-Wood Cemetery in Brooklyn. The book, John Brown's Spy. The Adventurous Life and Tragic Confession of John E. Cook, was written about him and published in 2012.

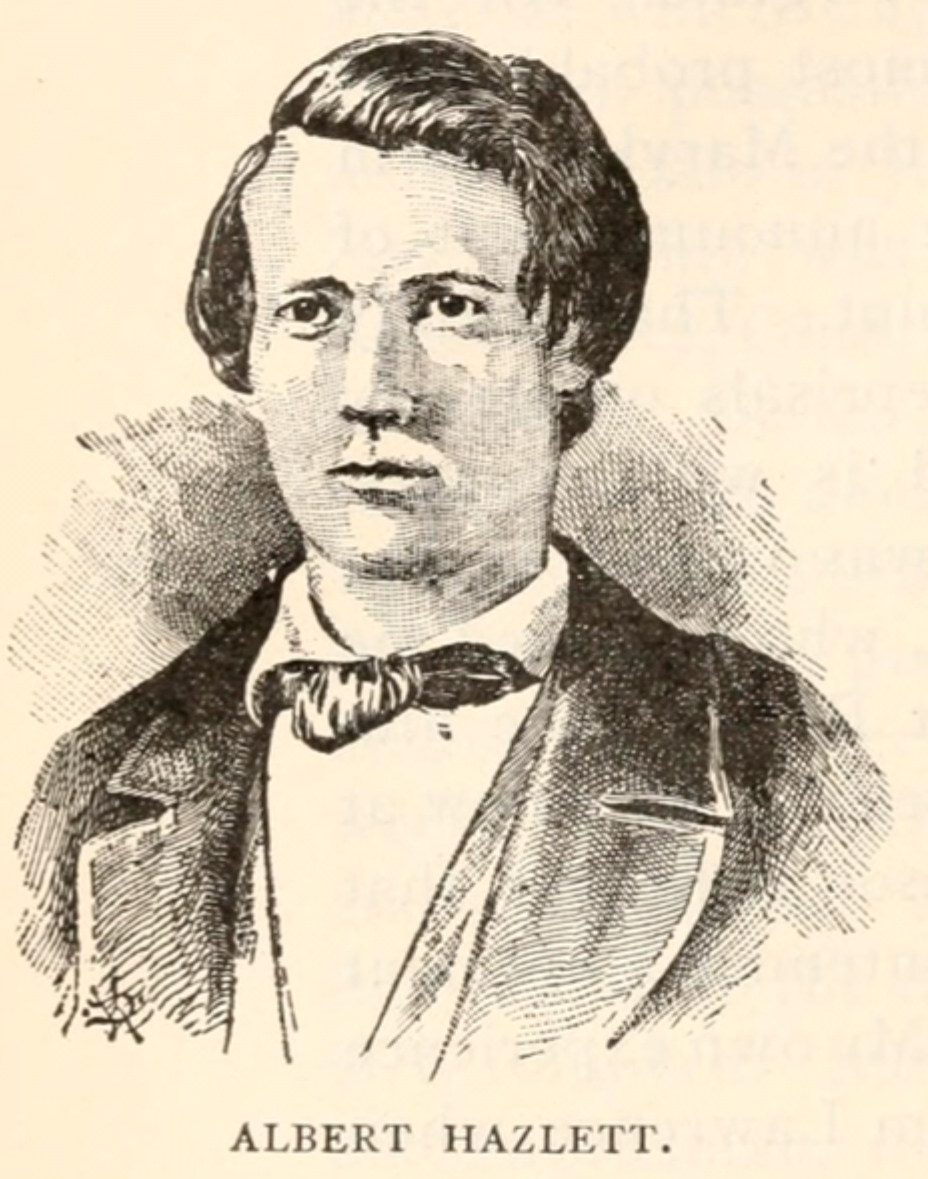
Albert Hazlett

Albert Hazlett, 23, fought in Kansas, escaped following the raid, but was captured and hanged March 16, 1860.

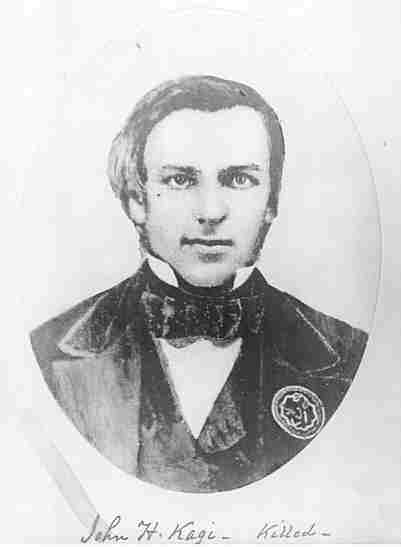
John Henry Kagi

† John Henry Kagi, about 24, a teacher from Ohio, became Brown's second in command, before the raid he printed copies of Brown's constitution in a printing shop he established in Hamilton, Ontario, mortally wounded during the raid He was shot and killed while attempting to cross the Shenandoah River. One report says mistakenly that his body was taken for dissection. First buried in one of two unmarked boxes near Harpers Ferry; re-interred in 1899 in a common coffin in North Elba.

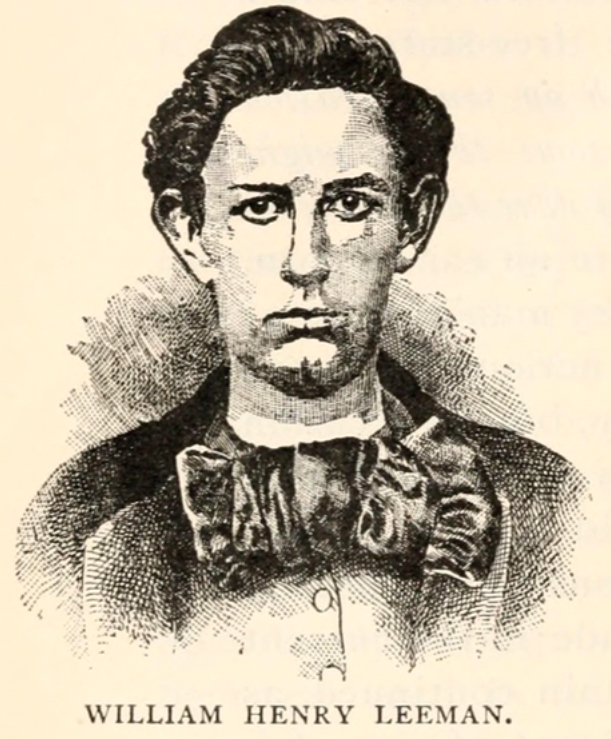
William Henry Leeman

† William H. Leeman, 20, fought with the free-staters in Kansas for three years, beginning at the age of 17. He died during the raid. Leeman, from Maine, youngest of all the raiders, was shot and killed while trying to escape across the Potomac River. His sister, Mrs. S. H. Brown, published a letter of John Brown of November 28, 1859, which according to her had never been published. It is alleged that he was killed not trying to escape, but trying to deliver a message of John Brown to either Owen Brown or John Cook.

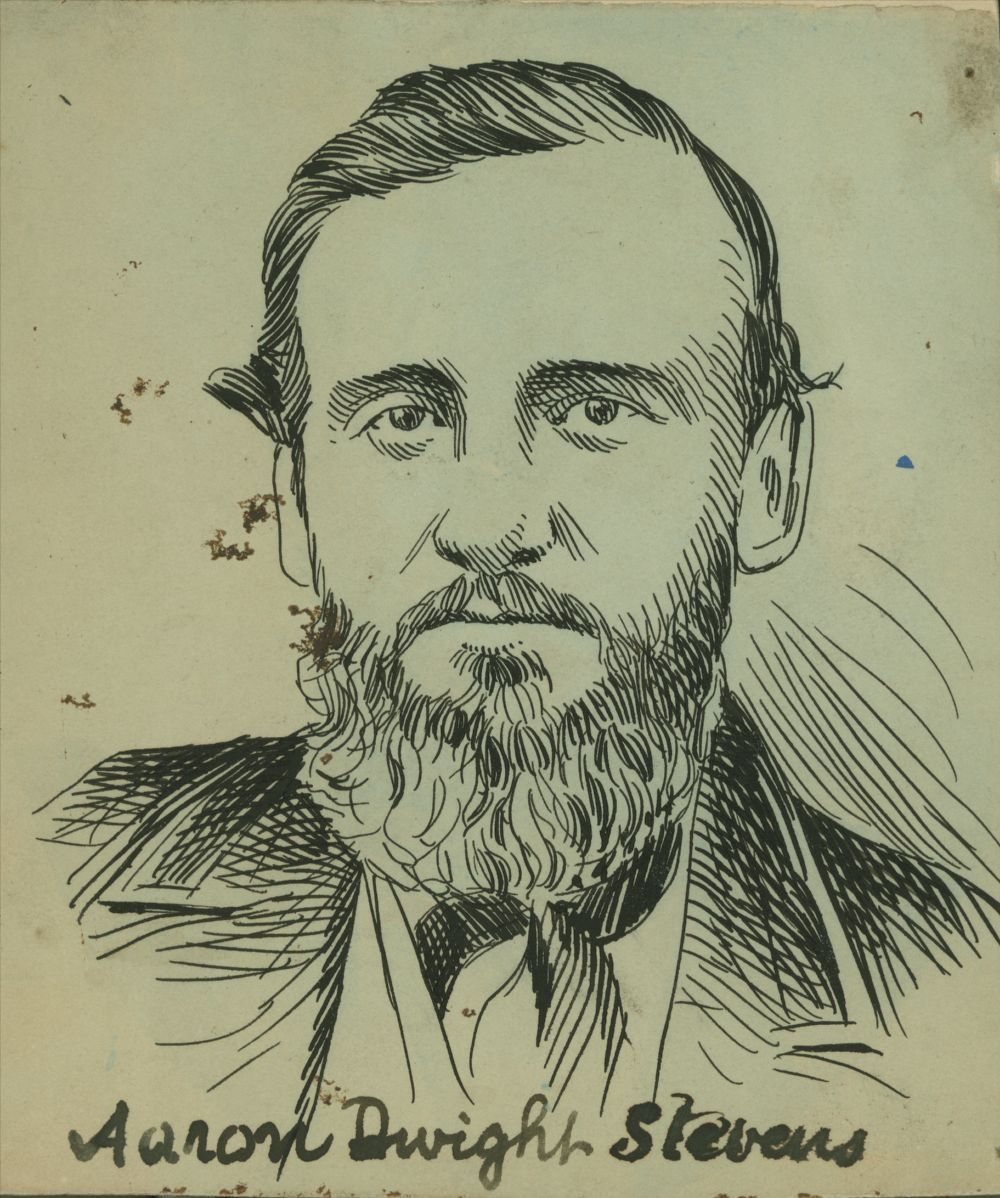
Aaron Dwight Stevens

Aaron Dwight Stevens, about 28, was a former soldier and fighter in Kansas, who gave the men military training and drills. He was wounded during the raid, after which he was executed on March 16, 1860.

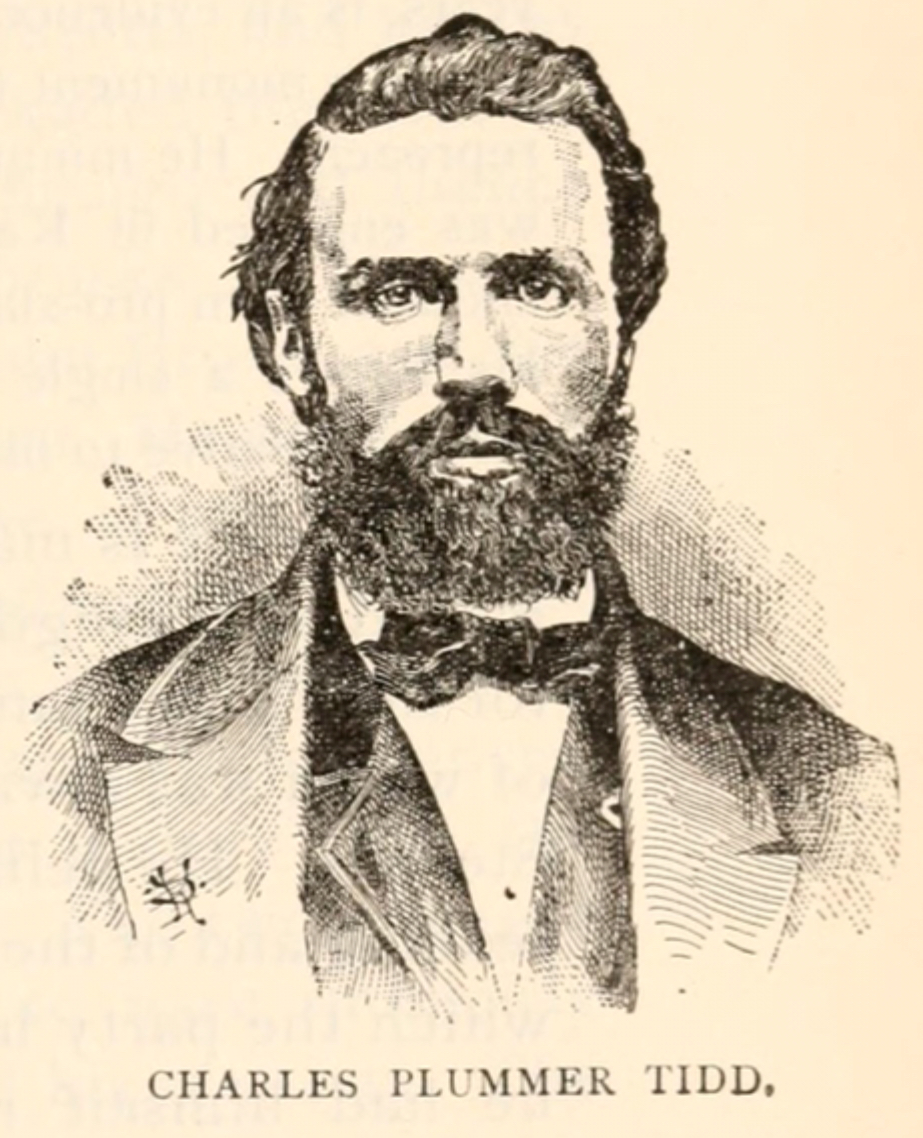
Charles Plummer Tidd

Charles Plummer Tidd, 25, fought in Kansas. He escaped the raid and later served during the Civil War. as a 1st Sgt. He died on February 8, 1862 and is buried at New Bern National Cemetery in Craven County, North Carolina.

=== Recruits ===
Men recruited for the raid are,

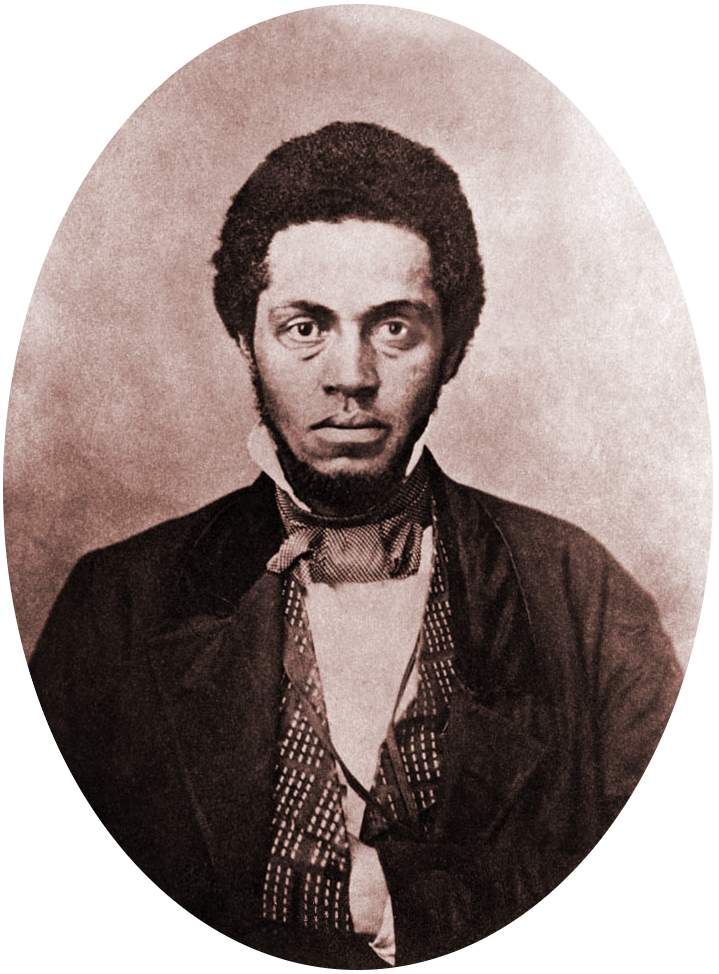
Osborne Perry Anderson

¶ Osborne Perry Anderson escaped capture following the raid. He is both the only black escapee and the only escapee that had been in the engine house. He is also the only raider to publish a memoir about the raid. He served as a recruiter for the Union Army, and died in poverty in 1872. He is buried at National Harmony Memorial Park in Hyattsville, Maryland.

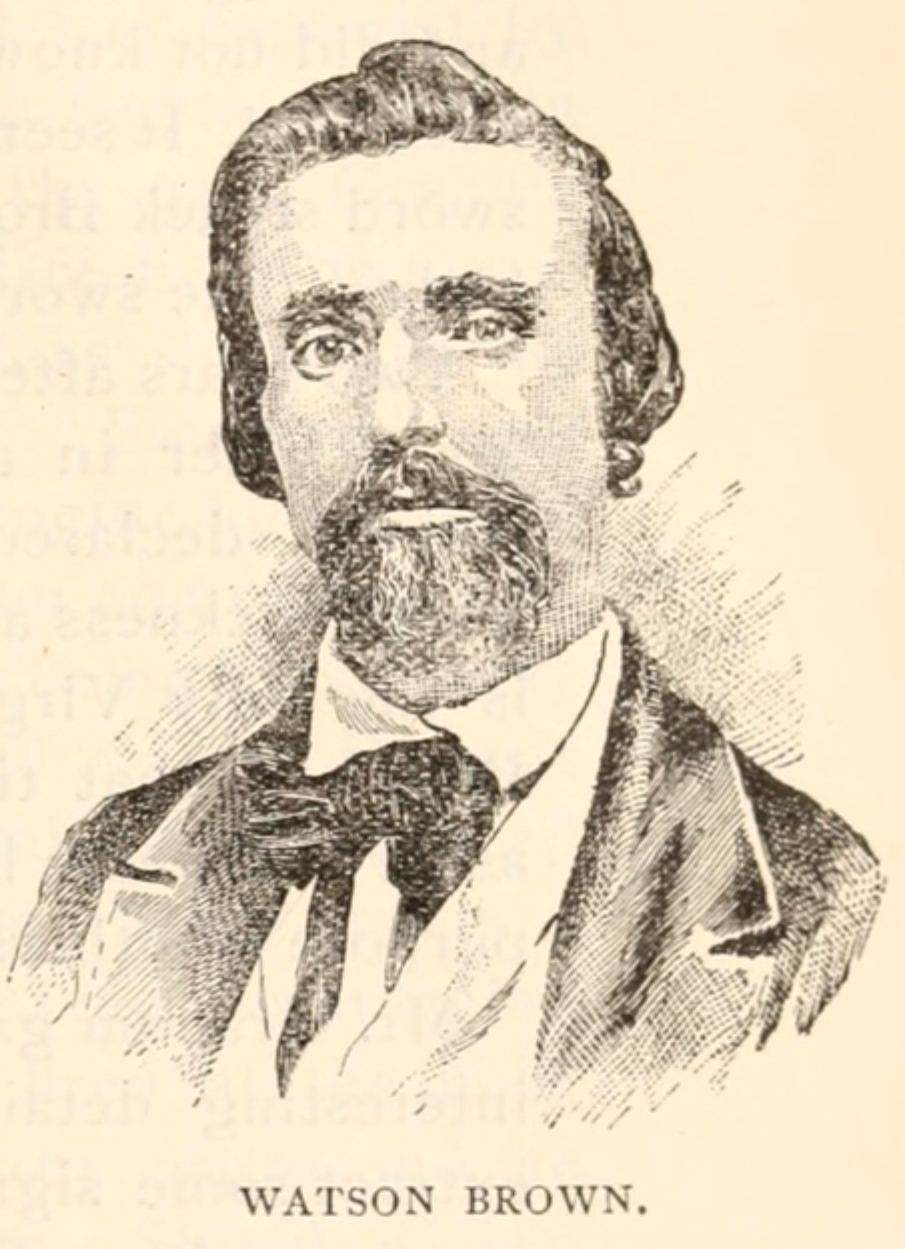
Watson Brown

‡ Watson Brown, 24, son of John Brown, was mortally wounded outside the engine house while carrying a white flag to negotiate with the opposing militia. He was not shot by a Marine, as they respected the white flag, but by an infuriated townsman. He survived in agony for another day. His body was taken by Winchester Medical College, skinned, and preserved as an anatomical specimen. When a Union army occupied Winchester in 1862, his body was "rescued" by a Union doctor, who had it shipped to his home in Indiana. It was returned to the family and buried in North Elba in 1882.

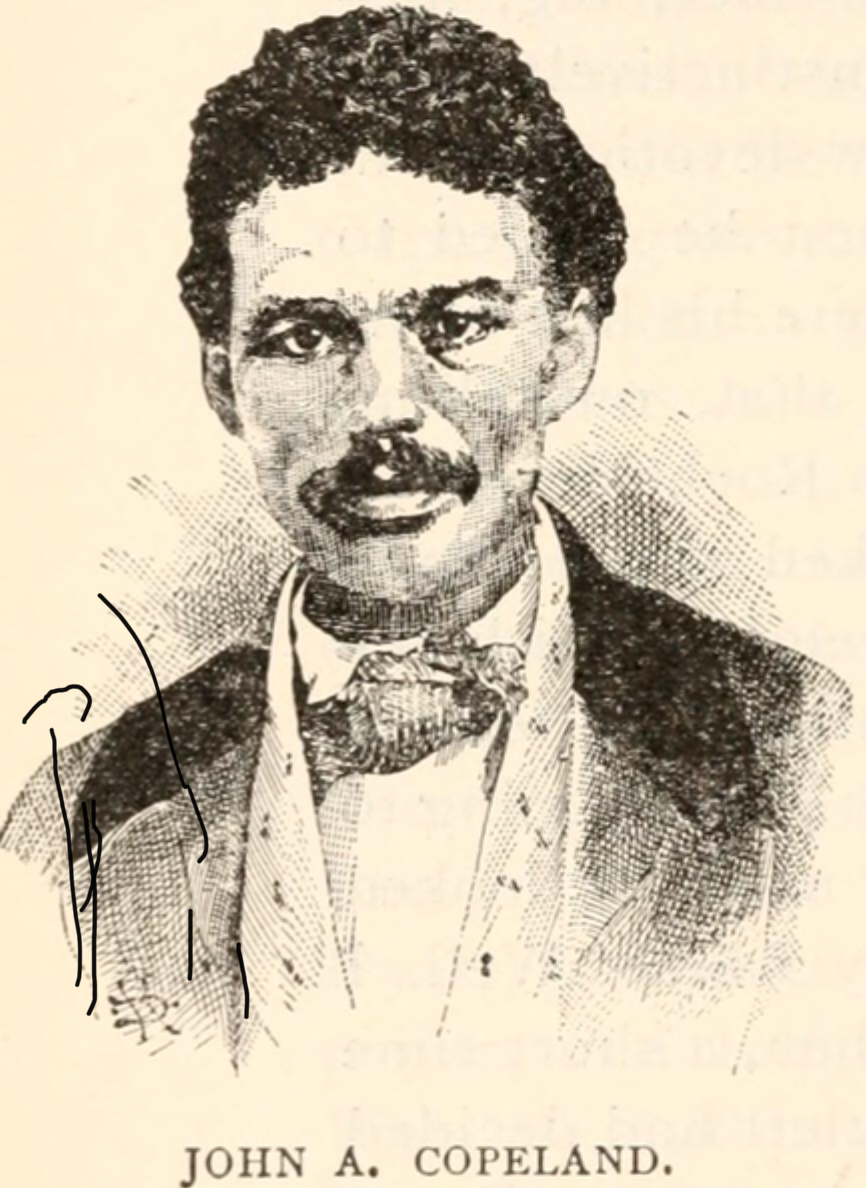
John Anthony Copeland

¶ John Anthony Copeland Jr. was a free black man who joined John Brown's raid on Harpers Ferry. He was captured during the raid and was executed16 December 1859. The book, The "Colored Hero" of Harper's Ferry: John Anthony Copeland and the War against Slavery, was published in 2015 detailing Copeland's participation.

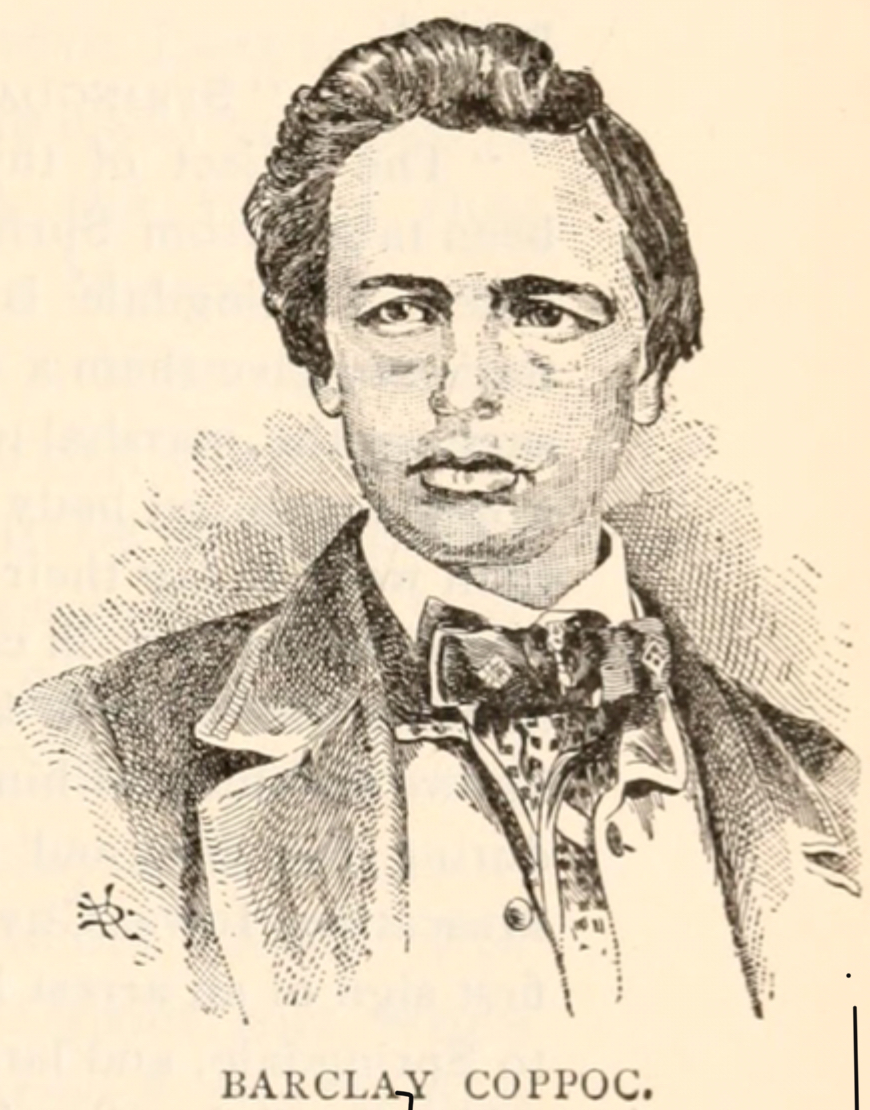
Barclay Coppock

Barclay Coppock, 19, escaped capture following the raid. He returned to Iowa in 1860 where he was allowed to escape to Canada due to Governor Samuel Kirkwood delaying Virginia's attempt to extradite him. Coppock then traveled to Ohio and later fought in the Civil War. He was killed on September 4, 1861, in a train crash caused by bushwackers; buried Mount Aurora Cemetery, Leavenworth. Kansas

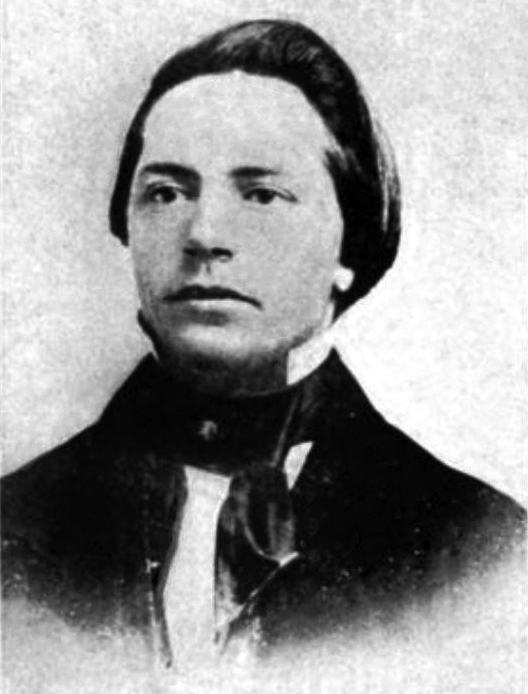
Edwin Coppock

Edwin Coppock, 24, he was captured and executed by hanging, December 16, 1859. Buried Hope Cemetery, Salem, Columbiana County Ohio

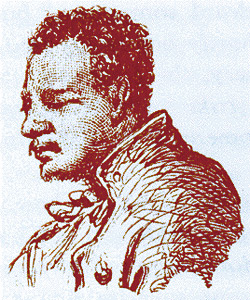
Shields Green

¶ Shields Green, about 23, escaped slavery. He was captured and hanged on 16 December 1859. The book about him, entitled The Untold Story of Shields Green, was published in 2020. (Note: The ages of Shields Green varies by source, between 22 and 30.) There is a cenotaph memorial in Oberlin, Ohio.

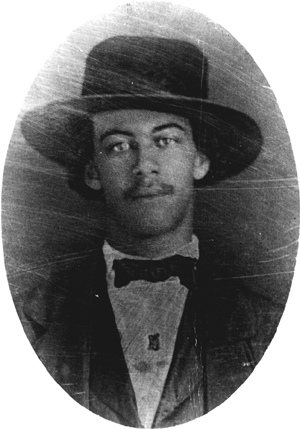
Lewis Sheridan Leary

† ¶ Lewis Sheridan Leary, 24, was freed by his white father and was a harness maker. Leary was from Oberlin, Ohio. "He said before he died that he enlisted with Capt. Brown for the insurrection at a fair held in Lorraine County, Ohio, and received the money to pay his expenses." He was stationed in the rifle factory with Kagi. He was mortally wounded while trying to escape across the Shenandoah River. John Anthony Copeland was his nephew, and Langston Hughes was his wife's grandson from a subsequent marriage. There is a cenotaph memorial in Oberlin, Ohio.

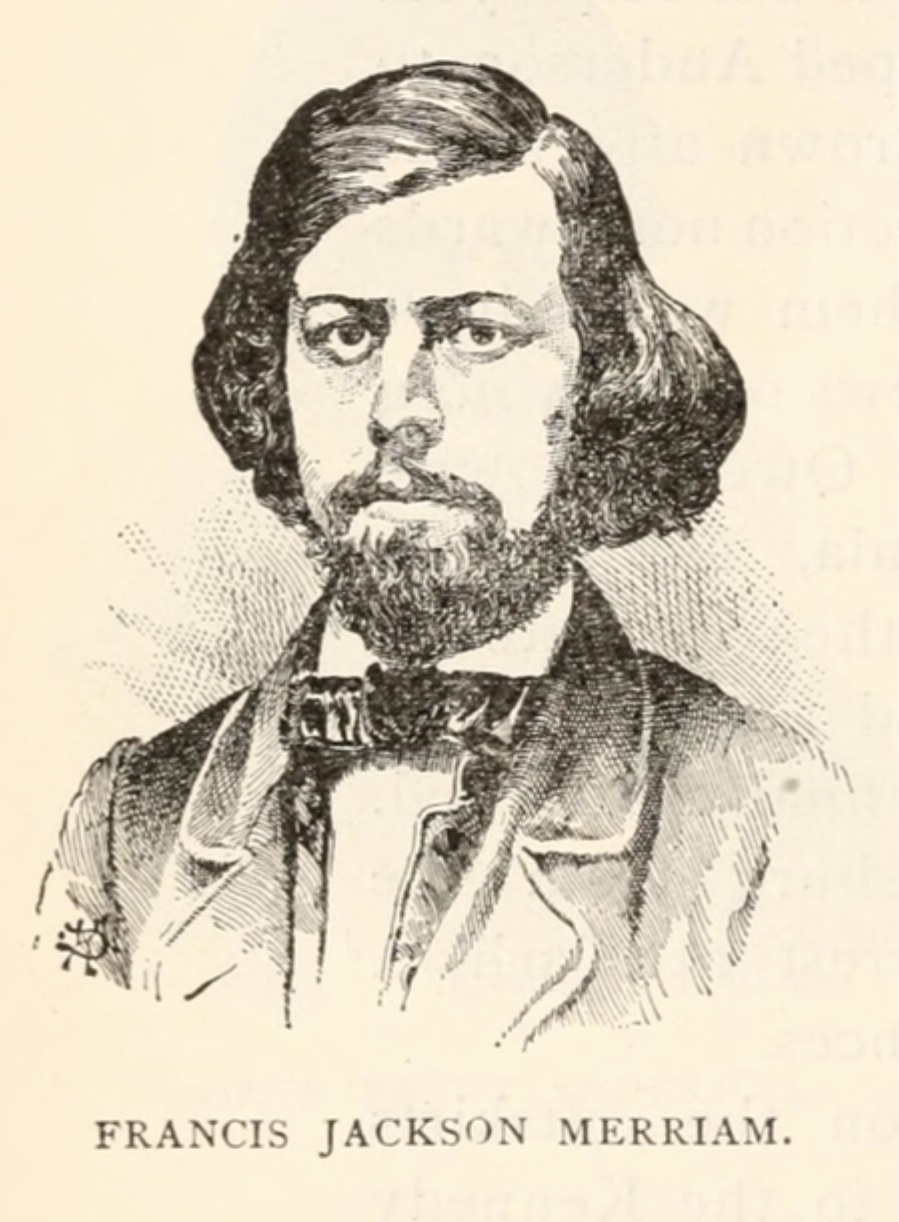
Francis Jackson Meriam

Francis Jackson Meriam, 22, grandson of Francis Jackson who was a leader of Antislavery Societies. Meriam was an aristocrat. He escaped during the raid. Captain Meriam led an African American infantry group during the Civil War. He died on November 28, 1865 in New York City.

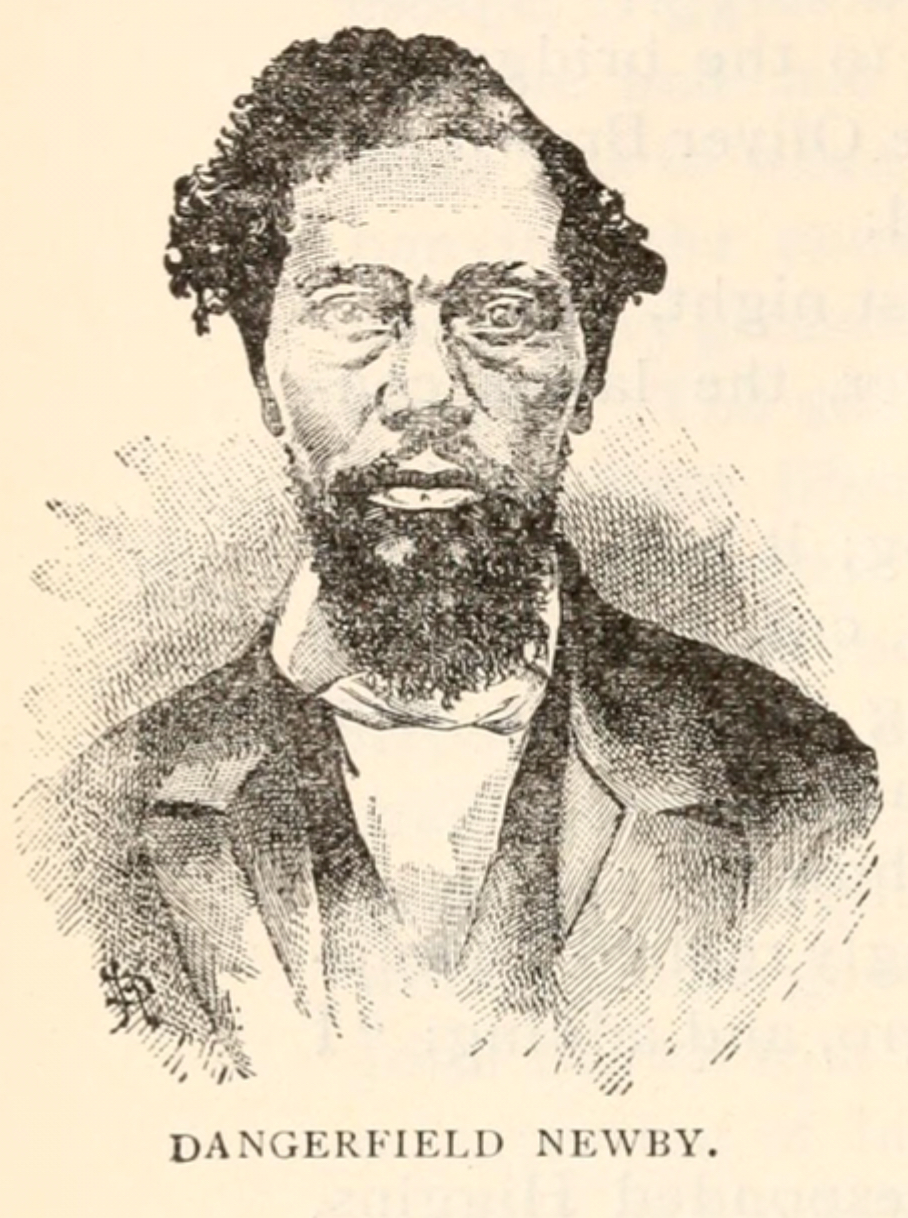
Dangerfield Newby

† ¶ Dangerfield Newby, 35 or 44, was born into slavery, with a white father who was not his owner. He was given permission to move to Ohio along with his mother and siblings, but when he tried to gain freedom for his wife and children, their owner refused to sell them even after Newby had earned and saved the agreed-upon price. This inspired Newby return to Virginia to join Brown's raid. Newby was described as a "huge mulatto", and was the first raider killed. His body was mutilated: his ears and genitals were cut off as souvenirs. He carried a letter from his wife in his pocket. There is a cenotaph memorial in Oberlin, Ohio.

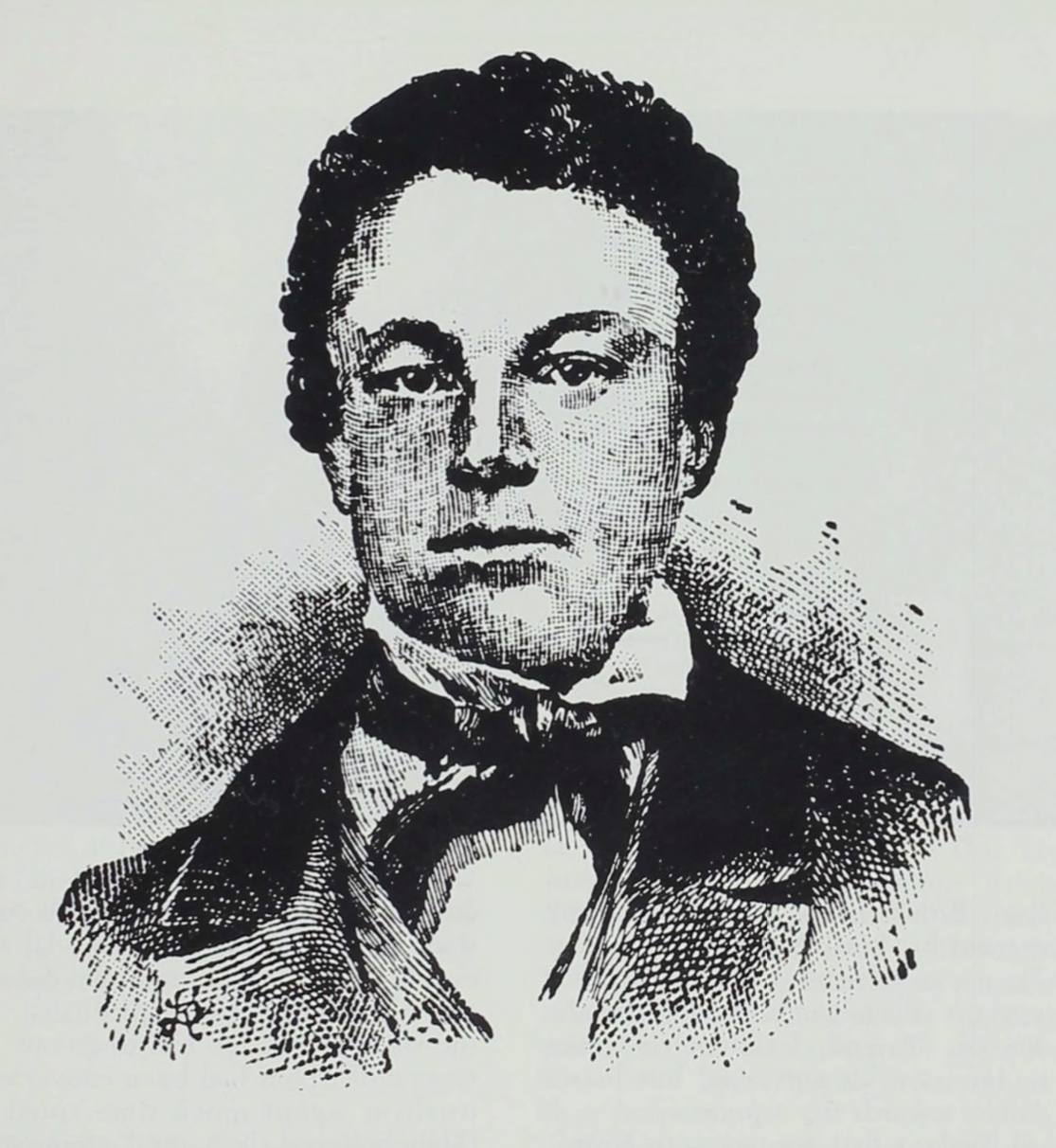
Steward Taylor

† Stewart Taylor, 22 or 23, he was a wagonmaker from Uxbridge in Canada West, who attended the Chatham convention. According to Brown's daughter Annie, "He was more what might be called a crank than any of the party. ...He became strongly imbued with the idea that he would be one of the first killed in the coming encounter, but this fixed belief did not cause the slightest shrinking on his part."

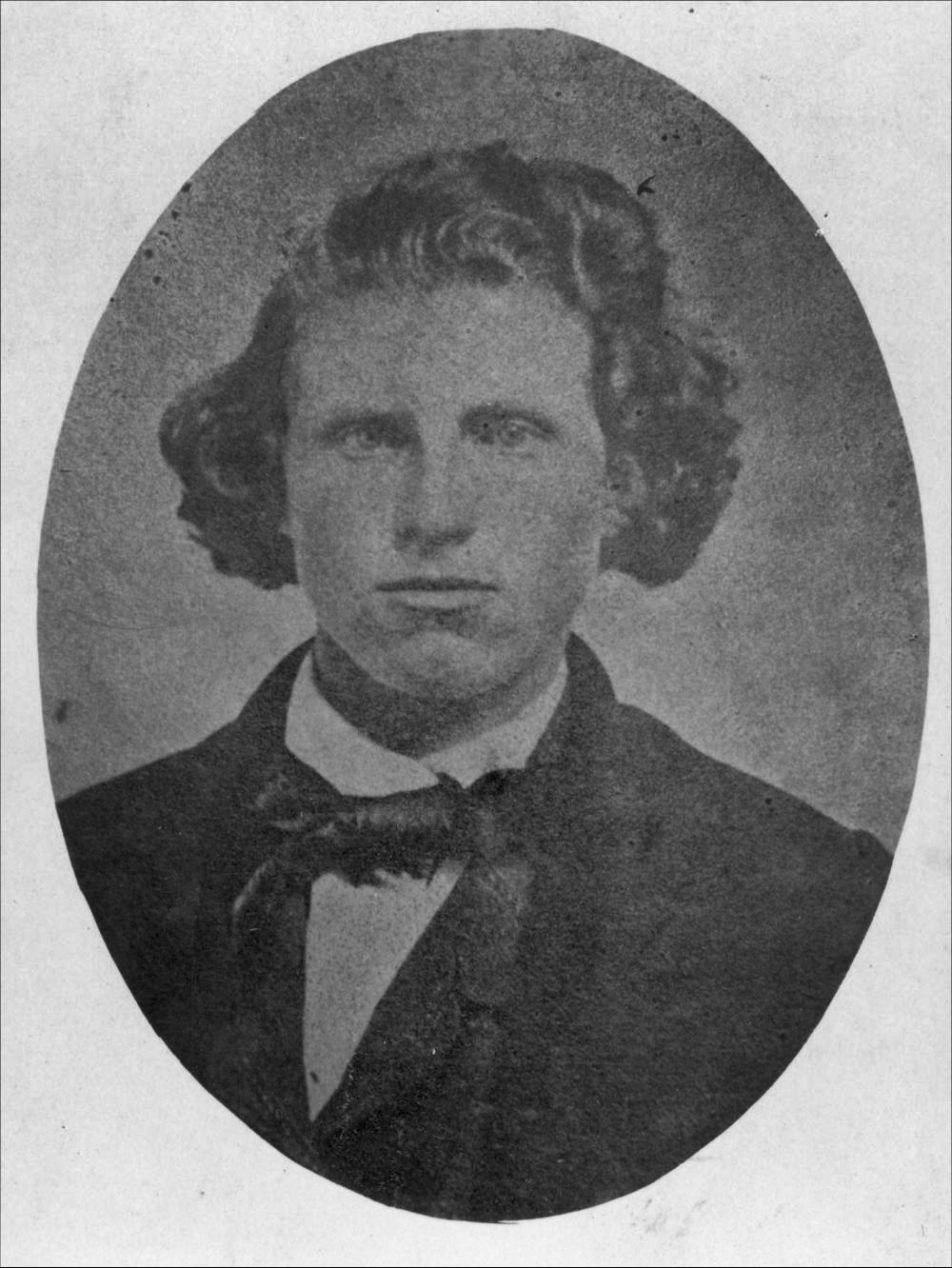
Dauphin Adolphus Thompson

† Dauphin Thompson, 21, mortally wounded during the raid From North Elba, New York, he was killed in the storming of the engine house. He was brother of William. First buried in one of two unmarked boxes near Harpers Ferry; re-interred in 1899 in a common coffin in North Elba.

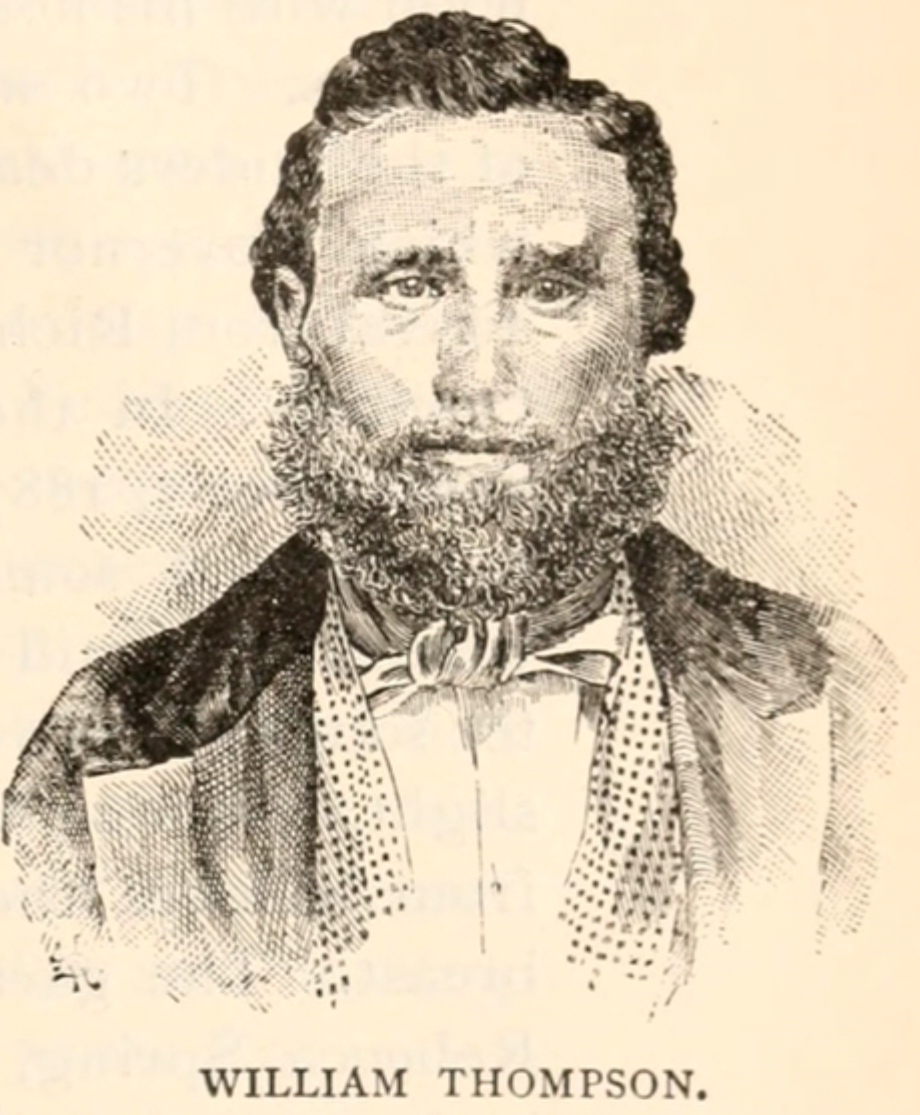
William Thompson

† William Thompson, 26, mortally wounded during the raid William Thompson, from North Elba, New York, was brother of Adolphus. They were brothers of Henry Thompson, who was married to Ruth, John Brown's eldest daughter. First buried in one of two unmarked boxes near Harpers Ferry; re-interred in 1899 in a common coffin in North Elba.

=== Joined the group in Harpers Ferry ===
¶ Jim was freed by Brown's men from Lewis Washington. According to Osborne Anderson, Jim fought "like a tiger". He was killed while trying to escape, which must have meant attempting to swim the river, and his body was presumably carried away downstream. The disposition of his body is unknown.

¶ Ben (Allstadt), freed by Brown's men from his owner, John Allstadt. His mother Ary, also belonging to Allstadt, came to the jail to nurse him and also died there.

== Leading up to the raid ==
In June, Brown paid his last visit to his family in North Elba before departing for Harpers Ferry. He stayed one night en route in Hagerstown, Maryland, at the Washington House, on West Washington Street. On June 30, 1859, the hotel had at least 25 guests, including I. Smith and Sons, Oliver Smith and Owen Smith, and Jeremiah Anderson, all from New York. From papers found in the Kennedy Farmhouse after the raid, it is known that Brown wrote to Kagi that he would sign into a hotel as I. Smith and Sons.

== Kennedy farmhouse ==
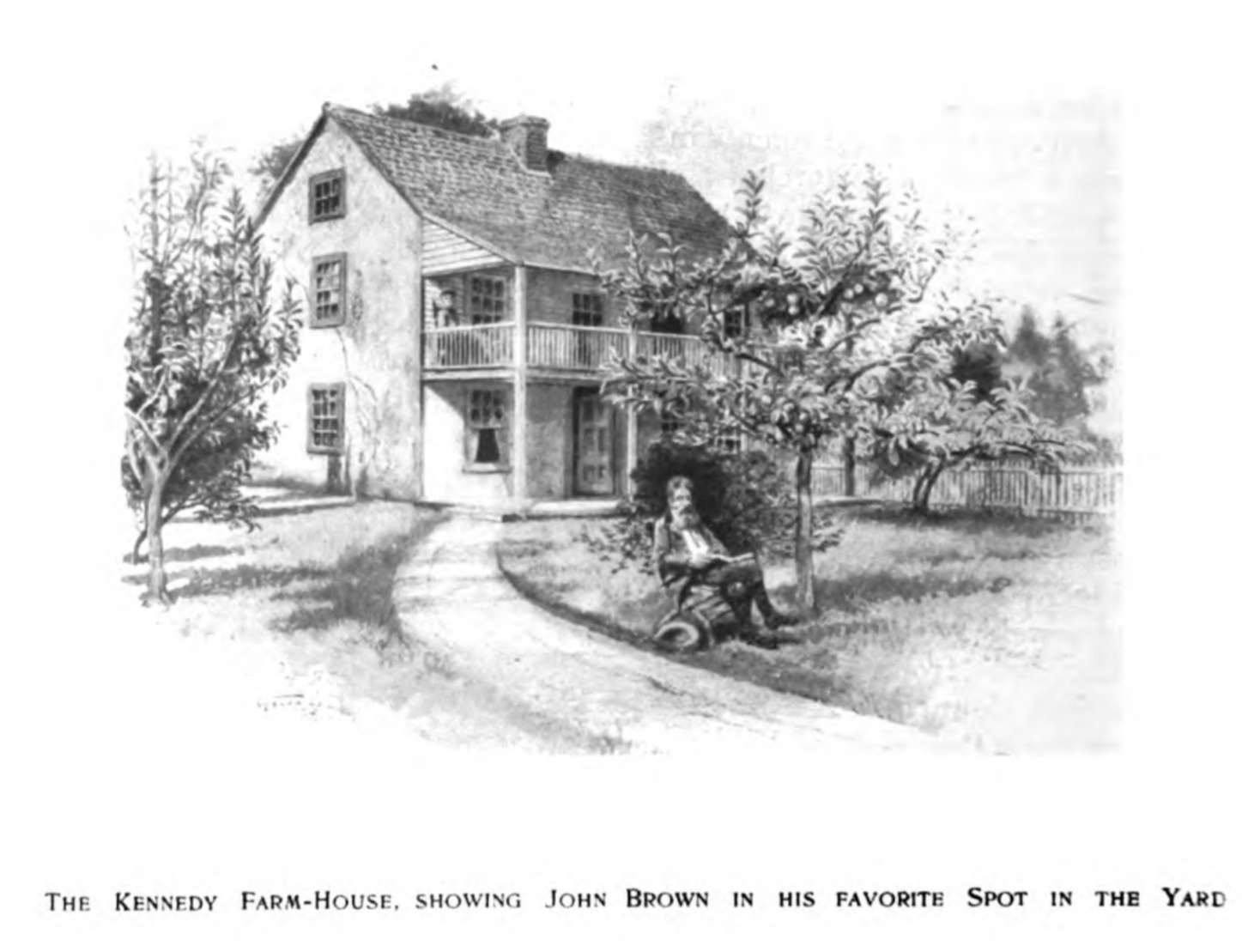
Kennedy Farmhouse, depicting Brown in his favorite spot in the yard, made posthumously in 1902.

They were at Kennedy Farmhouse, four to five miles away from Harpers Ferry. Brown's daughter and daughter-in-law, Annie and Martha, Oliver's wife, prepared food and kept the house for the men from August and throughout the month of September. Besides their domestic activities, Anne, who was 15, and Martha, 17, "kept discreet watch over the prattling conspirators in the house and hustled them out of sight on occasion, and who turned aside local suspicion by their sweet and honest ways." Martha was pregnant. (Note: Martha was visibly pregnant while at Kennedy farmhouse; she died in February after giving birth prematurely.) John sent them home to North Elba on September 29 or 30.

Much later Annie shared her recollections. "Ever after, Annie saw her months at the Kennedy farm as the most important of her life."

== Brown's raid on Harpers Ferry ==
Brown led his forces for Harper Ferry on the night of October 16, 1859. The objective was to take the armory, the arsenal, the town, and then the rifle factory. Then, they wanted to free all the slaves in Harpers Ferry. After that, they would move south with those newly freed people wanted to join the fight to free other enslaved people. Brown told his men to take prisoners who disobeyed them and to fight only in self-defense.

Of Brown's party of 22, counting himself, 19 went to Harpers Ferry (Jerry Anderson, Osborne Anderson, John Brown, his sons Oliver and Watson Brown, Cook, Copeland, Edwin Coppock, Green, Hazlett, Kagi, Leary, Leeman, Newby, Stevens, Taylor, brothers Adolphus and William Thompson, Tidd). Three men—Owen Brown, Barclay Coppock, Meriam—remained at the Kennedy Farm in Maryland, "to guard the arms and ammunition stored on the premises, until it should be time to move them."

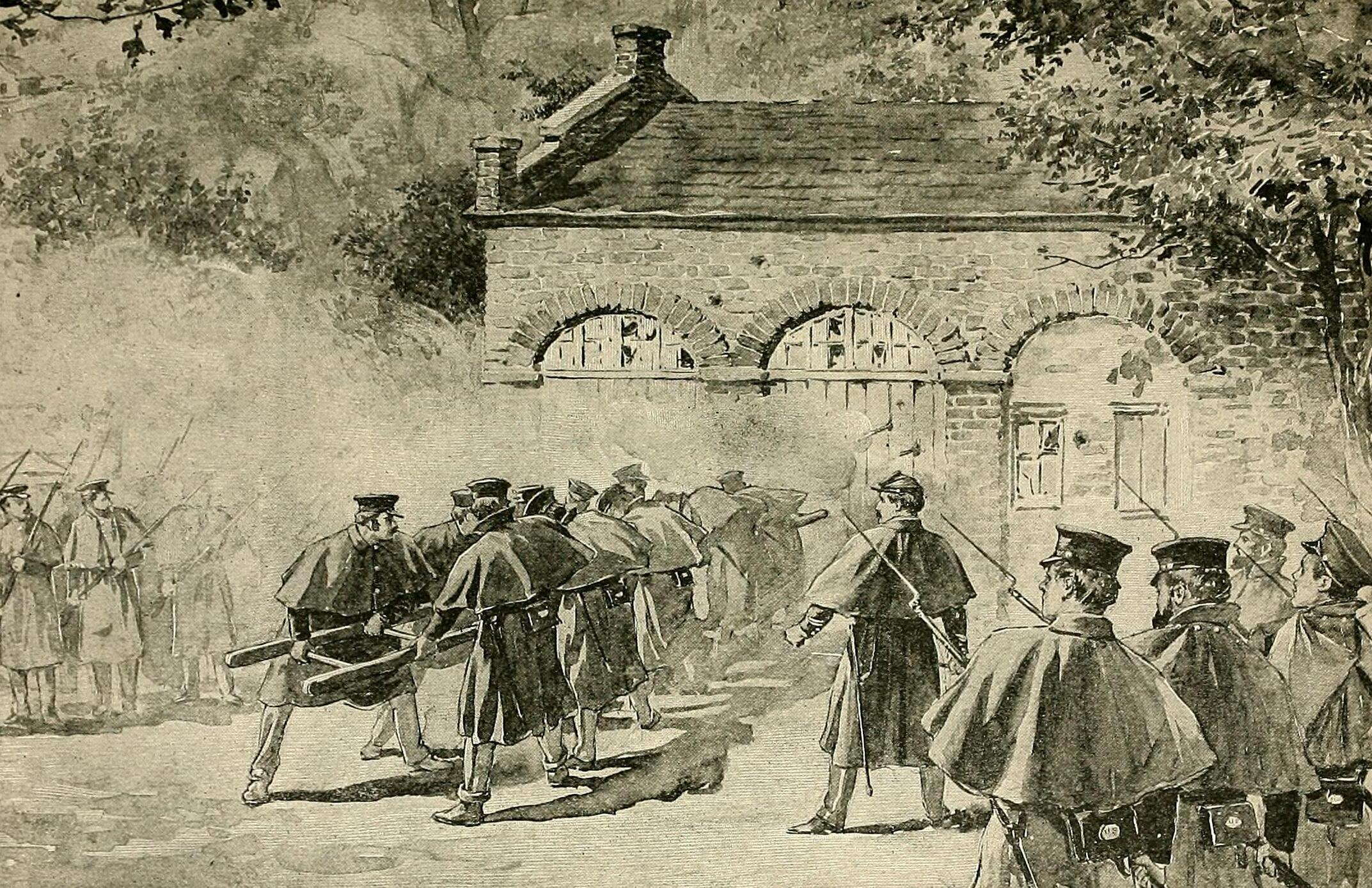
U.S. Marines, using a ladder, about to break down the door of John Brown's Fort

In the short term, the raid was a total failure. Brown and his men quickly captured the armory, which had only one watchman, and took over 60 residents of Harpers Ferry hostage as they arrived for work. Militia summoned from neighboring towns took over both bridges, thus cutting off escape, and by noon Monday forced Brown and his party to take refuge in the fire engine house of the armory, a sturdy building later known as John Brown's Fort. The militia freed most of the hostages, leaving only the handful in the engine house. Brown's party held out until Tuesday morning, when a company of Marines, led by Col. Robert E. Lee, quickly broke down the doors to the engine house and took the surviving raiders captive. The seven survivors, including John Brown himself, were quickly tried for treason, murder, and inciting a slave revolt, and were convicted and executed by hanging, in the Jefferson County seat of Charles Town. John Brown was the first person executed for treason in the history of the United States.

However, the raid and the following trials were extensively covered by the press. "The country had not been so excited about anything in twenty years." Historians frequently credit the raid not for starting the Civil War, but for providing the spark that lit the waiting bomb, or as Brown would have put it, causing "the volcano beneath the snow" to erupt. Brown thought that without violence, slavery in the United States would never end. As Frederick Douglass put it in a famous speech, given in Harpers Ferry, at Storer College, in 1881, "If John Brown did not end the war that ended slavery, he...began the war that ended American slavery and made this a free Republic."

The people of Virginia were furious, outraged at this attempt to get their allegedly happy enslaved to revolt. They took out their anger at any opportunity. Watson Brown was shot when he left the engine house carrying a white flag. William Thompson was shot on the bridge and taken to the hotel parlor; armed men came in, dragged him out, and threw him over the bridge into the river, firing as he fell. The owner of the hotel did not want the carpet ruined by shooting him there.

== Burials ==
The bodies of the slain lay in the streets, on the river banks, or wherever they fell. The body of the first man killed, Dangerfield Newby, lay in the street from 11 am Monday, when he was killed, until Tuesday afternoon, and was partially eaten by hogs; his ears and other body parts were cut off as souvenirs. The bodies of two of the men killed were taken by medical students to Winchester Medical College, for dissection. The remainder, which no local cemetery would accept, were dragged into a "gruesome pile", boxed, and dumped in an unmarked pit on the far side of the Shenandoah.

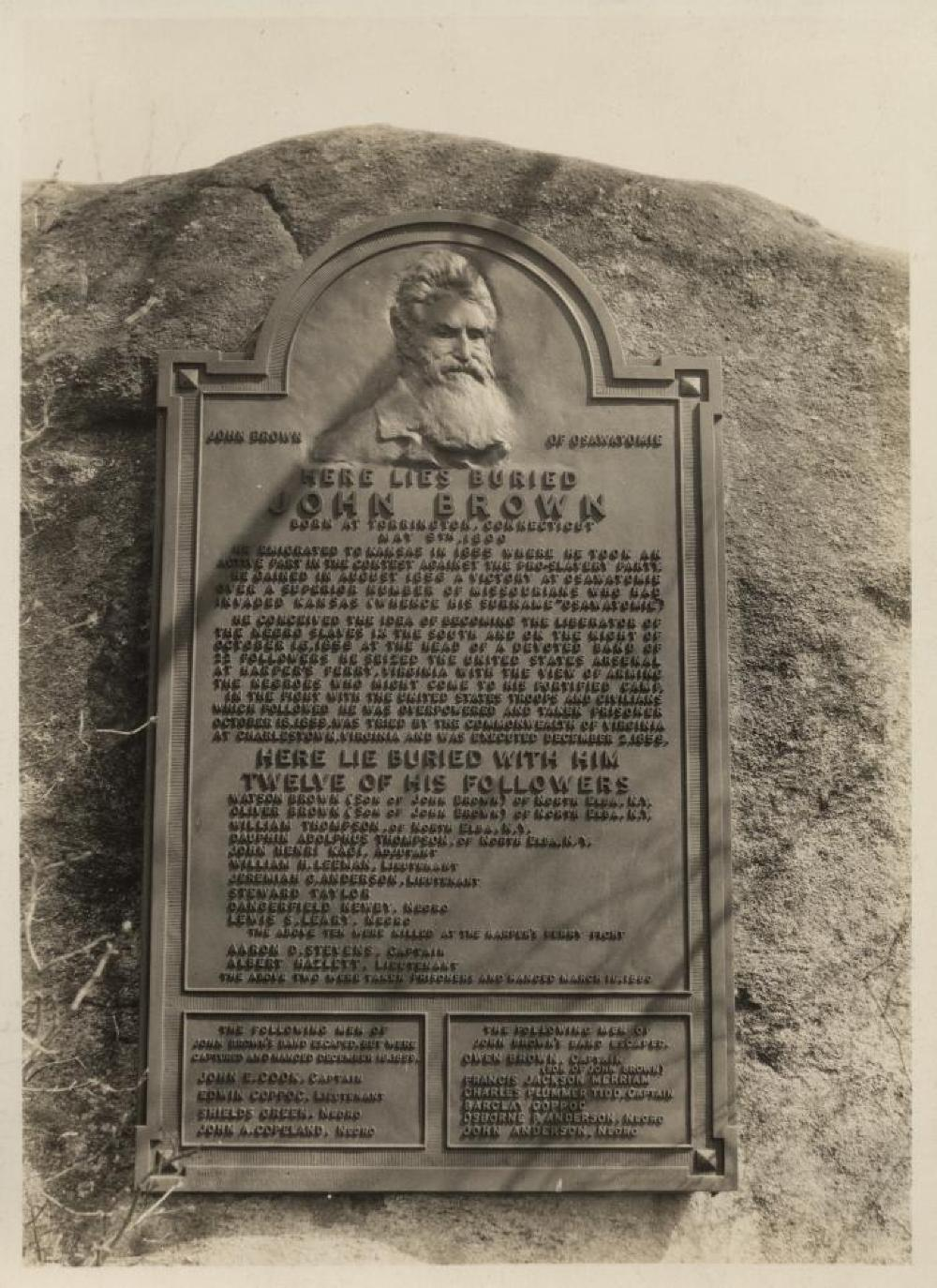
Plaque at John Brown's grave

Ten were ultimately buried in 1899 in a single coffin on the John Brown Farm in North Elba, New York, according to a plaque there. They include 8 of the 10 killed during the raid itself. Unwelcome in local cemeteries, they were thrown into two "store boxes", and two black men, for $5.00 each, buried them, without ceremony, clergy, or marker, on the far side of the Shenandoah (in Clarke County). The family knew that Oliver was buried "by the Shenandoah", but no more. Forty years later, one of the men who buried them was still alive, the unmarked pit was located, and the remains, which could not be matched to specific individuals, were exhumed and taken to North Elba—in secret because locals would have prevented it if they had known—and reburied in a single coffin, which was donated by the town of North Elba. Rev. Joshua Young, who had presided over Brown's funeral 40 years earlier, performed the last rites. Richard J. Hinton spoke at length. The plaque says the remains of Jeremiah Anderson are there as well, but this is not correct; they are lost, as are those of the two African Americans dissected.

With those 8, in the same coffin and ceremony, were the remains of Hazlitt and Stevens, who had been executed, and whose bodies had been buried at the Eagleswood Military Academy in Perth Amboy, New Jersey. A relative of Stevens had them disinterred so they could be buried with the others.

None of those killed (10) or executed (7) are buried in Harpers Ferry, Charles Town, or anywhere else in Jefferson County. Virginia Governor Henry A. Wise said he did not want those executed to be buried anywhere in Virginia, and none were.

Three bodies—1 white (Jerry Anderson) and 2 black (Copeland, Green)—were used for the dissection component of medical studies. The remains after the dissection were apparently discarded. In 1928, a pit containing bones of those dissected was found underneath the foundation of a building being torn down. The medical students and faculty did not know, or care, who they were. Their fourth body, that of Watson Brown, was identified from papers in a pocket as one of Brown's sons, though they did not know which one. It was preserved by a medical school professor and made into an anatomical exhibit, labeled expressing the Virginians' attitude toward abolitionists, and toward John Brown in particular.

Except for those mentioned below as buried by relatives, and the 3 missing bodies that were dissected, the other raiders killed or executed in 1859–1860 are buried at the John Brown Farm State Historic Site, near Lake Placid, New York.

Note that while there were 10 men killed during the raid itself, and 10 bodies reburied together at the John Brown Farm, the 10 are not the same. 2 of the first 10 (Watson Brown, Jeremiah Anderson) were taken to the Winchester Medical College for use by medical students. To the 8 remaining were added the bodies of Hazlett and Stevens, part of the raid but tried and originally buried separately. A relative of Stevens had his and Hazlett's bodies disinterred from their graves in New Jersey, so they could be buried with the others.

== Captured, tried, convicted, and executed by hanging ==
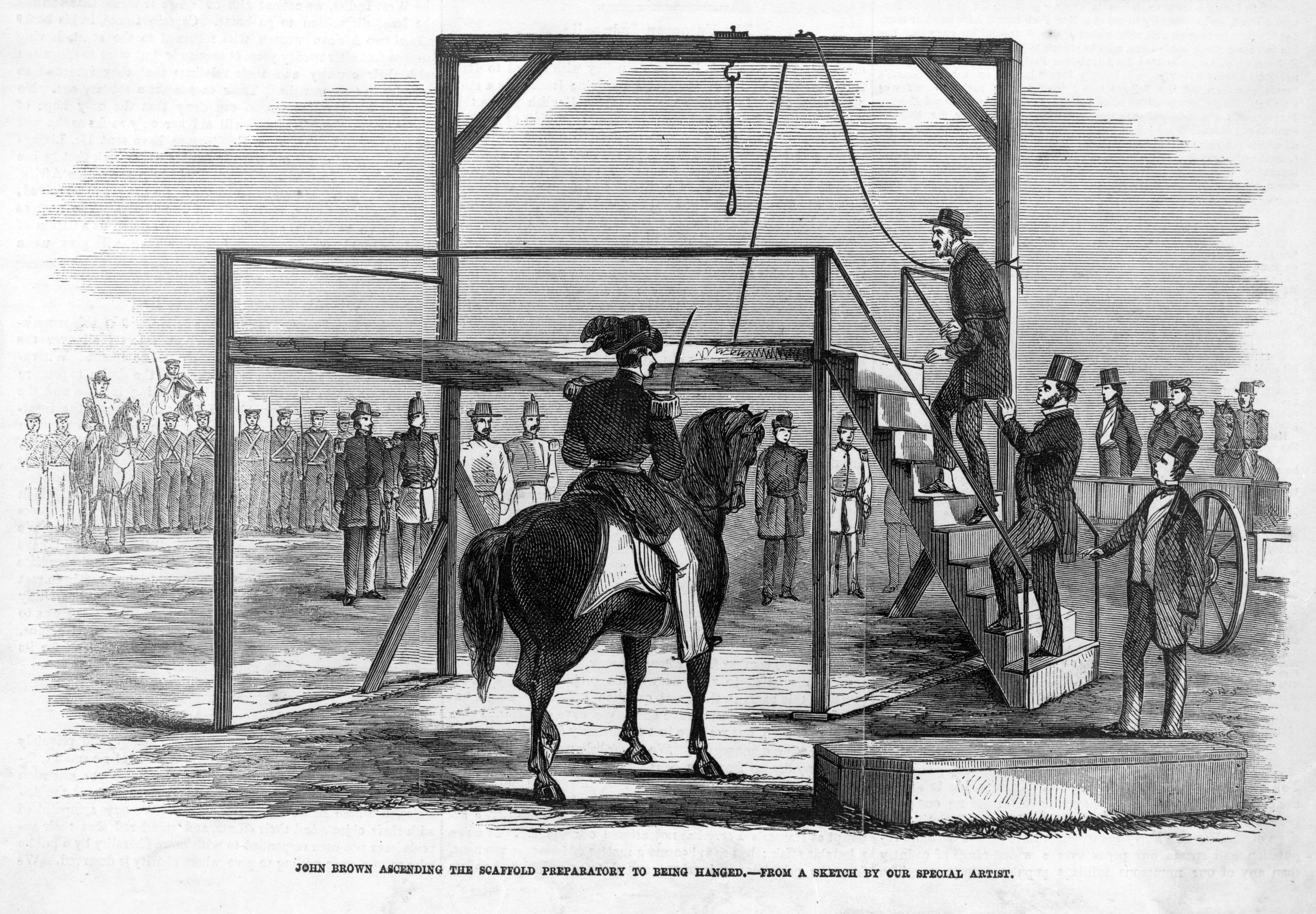
Gallows in Charles Town, where John Brown (pictured) and 6 others were executed

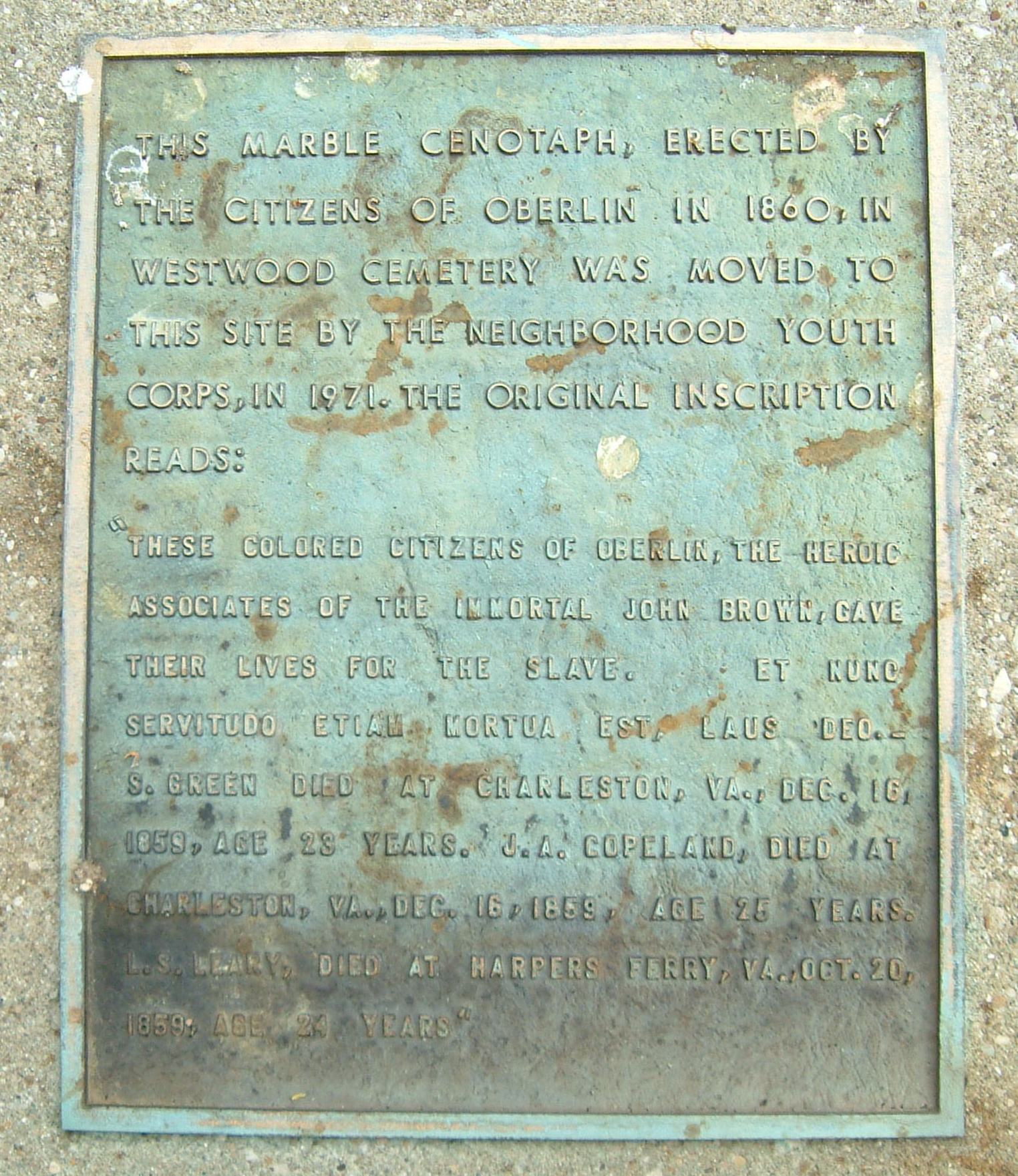
Plaque on cenotaph in cemetery in Oberlin, Ohio, commemorating Green, Copeland, and Leary; the remains of the first two are lost, and those of Leary are in a mass grave next to that of John Brown, in North Elba, New York.

In the Charles Town jail, by one report, Brown and Hazlett shared a room and a bed, Green and Coppock another, manacled together, and Copeland was in a third room. The rooms in the jail were described as "very large and nicely kept".

Brown was executed on Friday, December 2, four others on December 16, 1859, the negroes (Copeland, Green) in the morning and the whites (Cook, Coppock) in the afternoon, and two (Hazlitt, Stevens) on March 16, 1860. Cook and Coppock attempted to escape, but did not get over the jail wall.

To prevent a rescue, spectators at Brown's execution were very limited. (See Virginia v. John Brown § Spectators.) In contrast, Governor Wise wanted there to be a "tremendous" crowd for the December 16 hangings, and the Sheriff so informed the newspapers. "The execution was witnessed by an immense throng." There was a dress parade; among the participants was Lt. Israel Green of the U.S. Marines, the one who led the assault on the engine house.

- Buried by relatives
  - John Brown, 59. His widow took his body to North Elba, and buried him there. On the transportation of his corpse, which was not uneventful, see John Brown's body.
  - Edwin Coppock 24, shot and killed the mayor of Harpers Ferry, Fontaine Beckham, during the raid. He had been with John Brown in Kansas. He was visited in jail by "three Quaker gentlemen from Ohio, with whom he had lived in his boyhood, and an uncle, from the same State." One newspaper report says that his body was sent to his mother in Springdale, Iowa, another that it was sent to a Thomas Winn in Springdale, accompanied by his uncle, "a highly esteemed old Quaker gentleman, who did not sympathize in the least with the misguided and errant young man, and by him [the body was] conveyed to the home of his afflicted mother." A different report says that the Quaker was not a relative, but someone who took him in when he became an orphan.
  - John Edwin Cook, sometimes spelled Cooke, 29, born in Haddam, Connecticut, but was from Pennsylvania. He had been a teacher. He was Brown's second in command, by one report, had been with Brown in Kansas, and had lived undercover for over a year in Harpers Ferry. He was described as "a man of some intelligence", "a quick-witted, intelligent man", from a good family, who had studied law and taught school. He escaped into Pennsylvania after the raid, but Governor Wise offered a reward of $1,000, and he was soon captured. His attorney at the time, Alexander McClure, published lengthy recollections. A band played as he was taken from the jail in Chambersburg to the train that would take him to Charles Town for trial.

On October 28 he was visited in jail by his brother-in-law, Governor Ashbel P. Willard of Indiana, who wanted to be sure that this was his wife's brother, as the family had lost contact with him and had assumed he was dead. Accompanying him, at his request, were Indiana Attorney General Joseph E. McDonald and the U.S. District Attorney for Indiana, Daniel W. Voorhees. He was escorted to Cook's cell by Senator Mason, who offered to withdraw to give them privacy, but Willard replied that this was not necessary. He advised Cook that he should confess, "so as to exonerate those who were innocent, and to punish those who were implicated, as the only atonement he could now make." He told Cook that he had nothing to hope for but death. A different report, 40 years later, says that Voorhees had arranged with Governor Wise for Cook to escape, but that Cook refused. On November 8 Voorhees addressed the court, calling for mercy for "misled" Cook; his address was published widely. Cook was the only one captured who gave testimony about the other raiders; his testimony at his trial was immediately published as a pamphlet, so as to raise money for one of the victims. This motivated the Richmond Enquirer to call him "the most guilty of the Charlestown prisoners. So far from being the dupe of Old Brown, Osawatomie is the victim of John E. Cook."

On December 14 he was visited for some hours by Governor Willard, Voorhees, Willard's wife, and another sister. Body sent to A. P. Willard, care of Cook's brother-in-law Robert Crowley, Williamsburg, New York. First buried in Cypress Hill Cemetery, Brooklyn, New York, he was later reburied in Green-Wood Cemetery, also in Brooklyn.

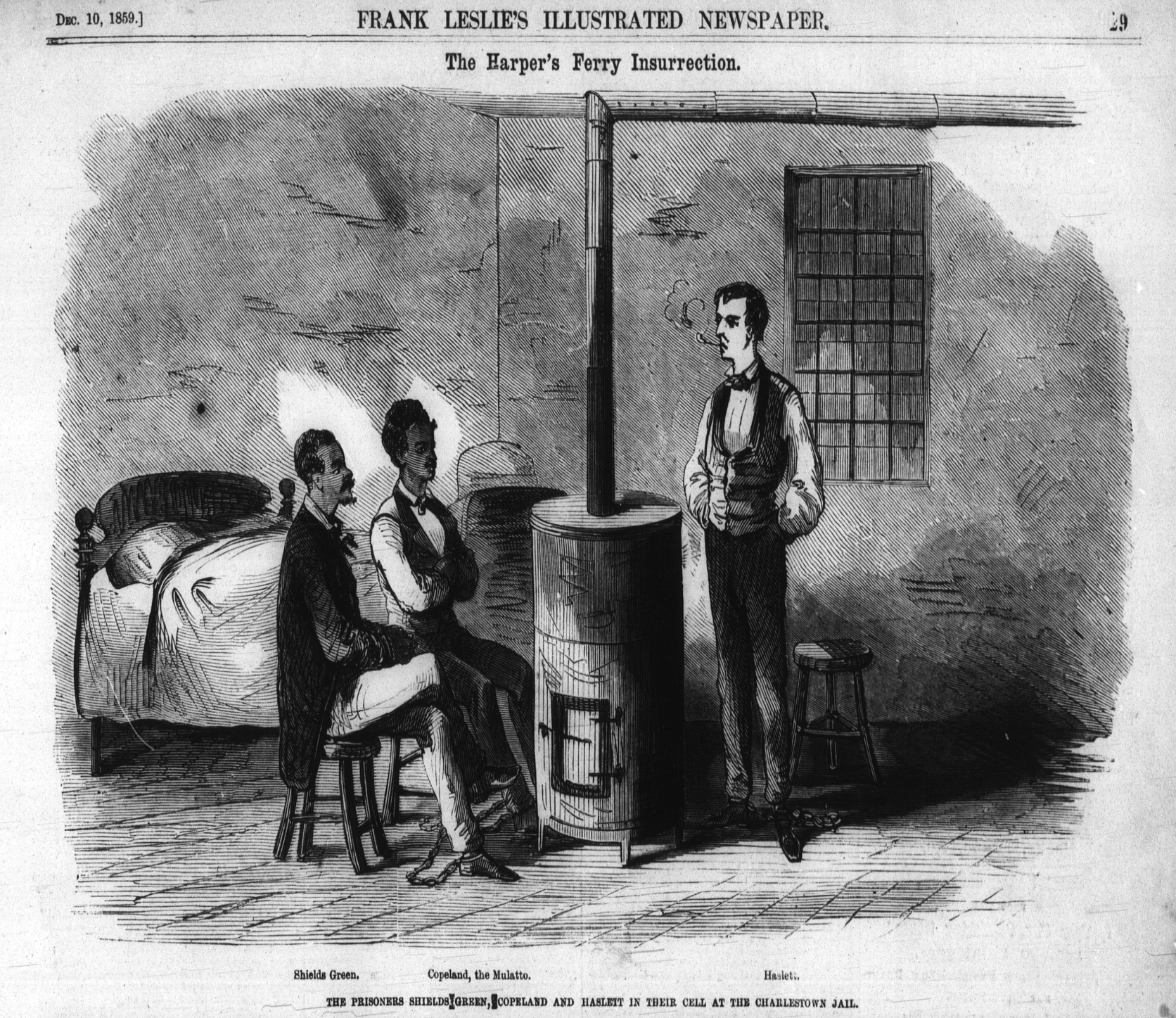
Shields Green, John Copeland, and Albert Hazlett in their cell in the Jefferson County jail

- Bodies immediately dug up by students of the Winchester Medical College. "They were allowed to remain in the ground but a few moments, when they were taken up and conveyed to Winchester for dissection." A letter from black residents of Philadelphia to Governor Wise, requesting their bodies so as to bury them, had no effect. In the early 20th century a pit containing loose bones of those dissected at the College was discovered.
  - ‡ ¶ John Anthony Copeland, Jr., a 24-year-old free black, described as a mulatto, joined the raiders along with his uncle Lewis Leary. Of Brown's raiders, only Copeland was at all well known. As a leader of the Oberlin-Wellington fugitive slave rescue, he was notorious in Ohio, and was a fugitive from an indictment for his role in that rescue. His parents attempted unsuccessfully to recover his body. On December 29, 3,000 attended a bodyless funeral in Oberlin, Ohio. The last resting place is unknown. Cenotaph memorial in Oberlin.
  - ‡ ¶ Shields Green, 22, was an escaped black slave from South Carolina. He was captured in the engine house on October 18, 1859, and hanged December 16, 1859, in Charles Town. The body was claimed by Winchester Medical College as a teaching cadaver. The last resting place is unknown. Cenotaph memorial in Oberlin, Ohio.
- Two raiders were not captured until it was too late to hold their trials during the term of the Jefferson County Circuit Court that ended on November 11, after pronouncing sentence on Coppock, Cook, Copeland, and Green on the 10th. The Legislature of Virginia authorized a special term of the Jefferson County Court to deal with them and other pending business. The Court reconvened on February 1; in the meantime Hazlett and Stevens were held in the Jefferson County Jail. Found guilty of the same charges, they were executed on March 16, 1860.
  - † Albert E. Hazlett escaped into Pennsylvania but was soon captured. Executed March 16, 1860.
  - † Aaron Dwight Stevens (Lee has Aaron C. Stevens), from Connecticut, 29, was the only one of Brown's men who had formal military training. He was shot and captured October 18. Executed March 16, 1860.

Their bodies were sent immediately to Perth Amboy, New Jersey, to the house of Marcus and Rebecca B. Spring, the latter of whom had nursed them in the Charles Town jail. A funeral was held there. The bodies were buried at the Eagleswood Cemetery, at the nearby Eagleswood Military Academy, an abolitionist school directed at one time by Theodore Weld, next to the graves of James G. Birney and her father Arnold Buffum. In 1898 they were reinterred with eight others at the John Brown Farm in North Elba, New York.

== Escaped north and never captured ==
Francis Jackson Merriam and Barclay Coppock joined Owen Brown in his prolonged, hazardous escape across Pennsylvania, finally taking refuge in Ashtabula County, Ohio, where John Brown Jr. lived. They were described as voters there.

In November 1859, Governor Wise offered a reward of $500 (~$17,917 in 2025) each for the apprehension of the four white escapees.

A Charles Town grand jury in February 1860 indicted them, along with Jeremiah Anderson [sic], for "conspiring with slaves to create insurrection". When new Virginia Governor John Letcher asked Governor William Dennison Jr. of Ohio to extradite them, he declined to issue warrants for their arrest, saying he had not received sufficient justification for doing so.

- Charles Plummer Tidd, a "lumberman" from Maine, had been a farmer in Kansas, where he met Brown. He died during the Civil War, 1862. Another reference says he was from Worcester County, Massachusetts. After enlisting in the Union Army, while his regiment was stationed at Roanoke Island, North Carolina, he died of a fever; his remains are buried at New Bern, North Carolina. Owen Brown, upset at the reaction to his comments on Tidd in his interview published in The Atlantic, said in a reply letter: "[M]y impressions of Tidd are that he was a very warm friend, generally of peaceful disposition, true, and devoted to his ideas of rights and moral principle. He was firm and persistent in what he undertook, somewhat inclined to be arbitrary, and with a temper not always under perfect control. As a whole, he stands far above the average of men. I hold for him a warm friendship."

The following three remained at the Kennedy Farm in Maryland, guarding the weapons.

- Owen Brown, after a very difficult trip, made it to the safety of his brother Jason's house in Ohio. For many years he raised grapes on an island in Lake Erie, "for the Chicago market" (not for wine). He died January 8, 1889, in Pasadena, California. His funeral was an event (with marching band) and his burial site, atop a peak named (because of him) "Brown's Peak", is a local tourist attraction.
- Barclay Coppock, 22 or 23, from Iowa like his brother, safely reached Canada. He died in the Union Army in 1861.
- Francis Jackson Meriam, 28 or 30, "of the wealthy Massachusetts Meriams", who "had furnished a good deal of money to the cause". Two days before the attack on Harpers Ferry, before a lawyer in Chambersburg, accompanied by Kagi, he made his will, leaving most of his estate to the Massachusetts Anti-Slavery Society. After the raid, "he reached the railroad in Maryland, passed on to Philadelphia, where he remained overnight at the Merchants' Hotel, registering his true name, and proceeded next morning to Boston." Another source says that he went to Canada before coming to "his physician in Boston. He served in the Union army as a captain in the 3rd South Carolina Volunteer Infantry Regiment (Colored). (Colored regiments had white officers.) He died of natural causes in 1865. A conflicting report says that he "went to Mexico to join [Benito] Juárez in 1865...and has not since been heard from".

(The plaque at the John Brown Farm says a negro named John Anderson escaped; the source for this is apparently biographer Franklin Sanborn, who has nothing else to say about him and omits him from the book index. There was no person of that name among Brown's raiders; Brown received in jail a letter from John Q. Anderson, brother of Jeremiah, inquiring about his brother. Later Sanborn calls John Anderson "rather mythical", someone "whom Hayden enlisted for Brown, but who never got to the Ferry".)

== Black people who joined Brown's rebellion ==
Brown said many times that he had expected a large number of enslaved black people of Jefferson County to flee their owners and assist him in the raid and afterwards. This did not happen, a main reason for the raid's failure. However, this was extended, especially by Virginia Governor Wise, to a claim that black people were hostile to Brown and gave him no support at all. Both black and white people denied black participation. Any black person who could claim they were there involuntarily did so, and most did, as otherwise they would have been executed. (Shields Green was not successful at this, since his skin was so dark that Harpers Ferry residents immediately recognized he was not a local.) The whites went along with this. It was a basic belief in the South at the time that their slaves were happy, and they would be happier if abolitionists just left them alone; they were highly motivated to believe that no slaves supported Brown.

Of the various contradictory reports made by slaveholders and their satellites about the time of the Harper's Ferry conflict, none were more untruthful than those relating to the slaves. There was seemingly a studied attempt to enforce the belief that the slaves were cowardly, and that they were really more in favor of Virginia masters and slavery, than of their freedom. As a party who had an intimate knowledge of the conduct of the colored men engaged, I am prepared to make an emphatic denial of the gross imputation against them.

Another raider who escaped, C. P. Tidd, said much the same. Captain Dangerfield reported seeing "negroes armed with pikes" when he arrived at the Armory. According to a local newspaper, "the slaves for miles around Harper's Ferry, though well kept and kindly treated, were well informed as to John Brown's movement, and prepared to take part in the insurrection." Brown's mistake was that, afraid of betrayal by Cook or Forbes, he "suddenly changed the time to two weeks earlier". He failed to notify the slaves of the change.

A correspondent from the Cincinnati Commercial, in Charles Town for the execution, reported: "As to the negroes round about Harper's Ferry and Charlestown there can be no doubt but they were deeply interested in the events that have recently taken place, and that many of them looked upon the outbreak, as the lifting of the dark cloud of slavery from their race. ...It is believed that many of the negroes did know something extraordinary was about to happen in the vicinity of Harper's Ferry, and a well informed and candid gentleman told me that he had no doubt Brown believed his plans were found out, or about to be found out, and struck the blow two weeks at least, and perhaps six weeks earlier than he intended. This gentleman is convinced that if the plans had been perfected, Brown would actually have had a negro for every one of his spears, and would have made his way through the mountains of Maryland into Pennsvlvania."

So Robert E. Lee's statement, in his "Report", that local black people gave Brown no voluntary assistance at all, is not correct, though it appeared again in the Senate Special Committee report and in many Southern reports on the raid. Andrew Hunter, Virginia Governor Henry A. Wise's attorney and the prosecutor in Charles Town, informed Wise confidentially that: "We believed and knew, as we thought then and still think, that he [Brown] could not seduce our slaves. It may be here remarked that, so far as I knew or learned from any quarter, not a single one of the slaves in the county of Jefferson or in Maryland, adjacent, ever did join him in his raid, except by coercion, and then they escaped as soon as they could and went back to their homes." Judge Parker concurred. Wise turned this statement into a claim he made repeatedly in speeches: "not a slave around was found faithless". These "faithful slaves" who allegedly refused to help Brown at Harpers Ferry became a key element in the "Lost Cause" myth of happy Antebellum Southern life. The United Daughters of the Confederacy had later a "Faithful Slave Committee" trying to honor them with a monument in Harpers Ferry (see Hayward Shepherd Monument).

However, we know positively, said a newspaper story, that some 25 enslaved black people, out of 200 acquainted to some degree with Brown's project, helped the raiders; they all claimed to have been impressed (forced). Another source says that "there has [sic] not been more than 20 negroes under arms." The True Bill of Indictment gives the names of 11 slaves whom the conspirators had allegedly incited to revolt, 4 of Lewis Washington (Jim, Sam, Mason, and Catesby), and 7 of John Allstadt (Henry, Levi, Ben, Herry, Phil, George, and Bill), plus "other slaves to the jurors unknown". Of those, we have clear documentation of two that were with Brown voluntarily. One was Jim, "a young coachman hired by Lewis Washington from an owner in Winchester"; he drowned attempting to flee by crossing the river. "There is no doubt that Washington's negro coachman, Jim, who was chased into the river and drowned, had joined the rebels with a good will. A pistol was found on him, and he had his pockets filled with ball cartridges, when he was fished out of the river."

Ben, who was owned by John Allstadt, was captured and almost lynched. He died in the Charles Town jail of "pneumonia and fright", along with his mother Ary, also owned by Allstadt, who had come to nurse him. Both owners filed claims with the government of Virginia for compensation for the loss of their "property" in the raid; it is not known if their claims were successful.

These are not the only black people that fled their owners and participated in the raid. According to Frederick Douglass, "fifty slaves were collected and emancipation was proclaimed in Virginia and Maryland".

[O]ne instance in which the slaves made a public appearance with arms in their hands is related. A negro who had been sharply used by one of the town people, when he found that he had a pike in his hand, used his brief authority to arrest the citizen and have him taken to the armory.

The first report on "insurrectionists" killed gave the number of 17, but only 10 were Brown's men, and the other 7 must have been liberated slaves helping him. One was "an old slaveman of the neighborhood, who distinguished himself by reckless courage." He shot armorer Boerly after the latter shot Newby. "He was probably killed soon after." "In the engine house there were "a few negroes that had been liberated and armed by Brown". Except for Ben and Jim, their names are unknown. "The number of colored men slain by the reckless fire of the belligerants is given as seventeen." There were twelve or thirteen bodies immediately buried, but only the names of eight are known. There were other slaves killed whose bodies were carried away by the river. According to Louis DeCaro, at the peak there were 20 to 30 local slaves involved, who quickly and quietly went back to their masters' when it became clear the raid was failing.

According to the 1860 census, there were 589 escaped slaves in Jefferson County. "No adjacent Counties reported any [or] very, very few such escapes in the same census." There is a long list of fires set in Jefferson County during the final months of 1859, including those at the farms of men who had been on the jury that convicted Brown.

In Harpers Ferry, a Black Voices Museum, at 17 High Street, was operating in 2020.

== Gallery ==
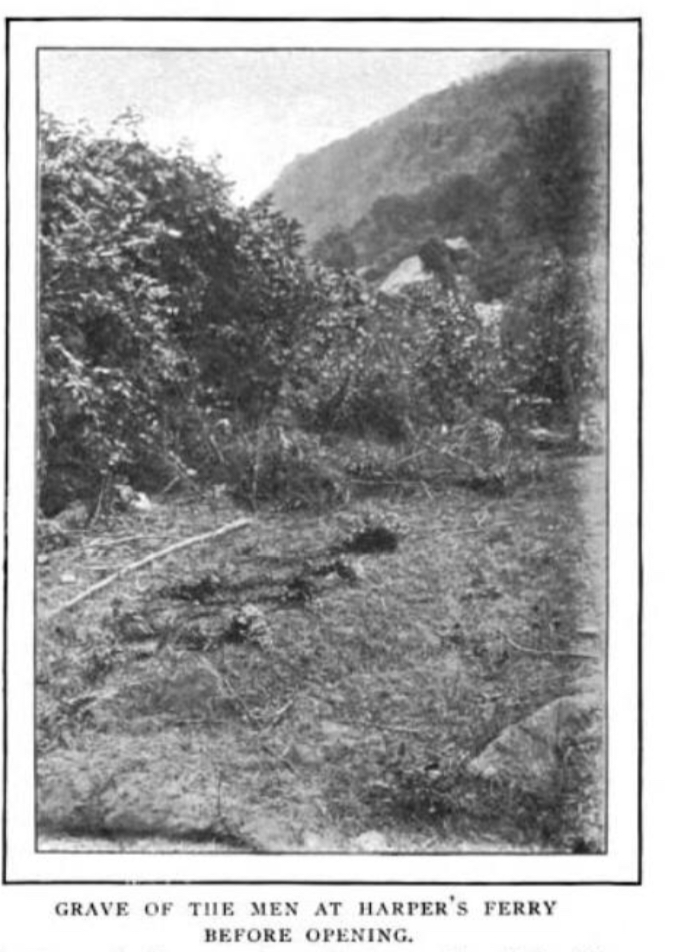
Spot where crates with bodies of Oliver Brown and seven others were buried.

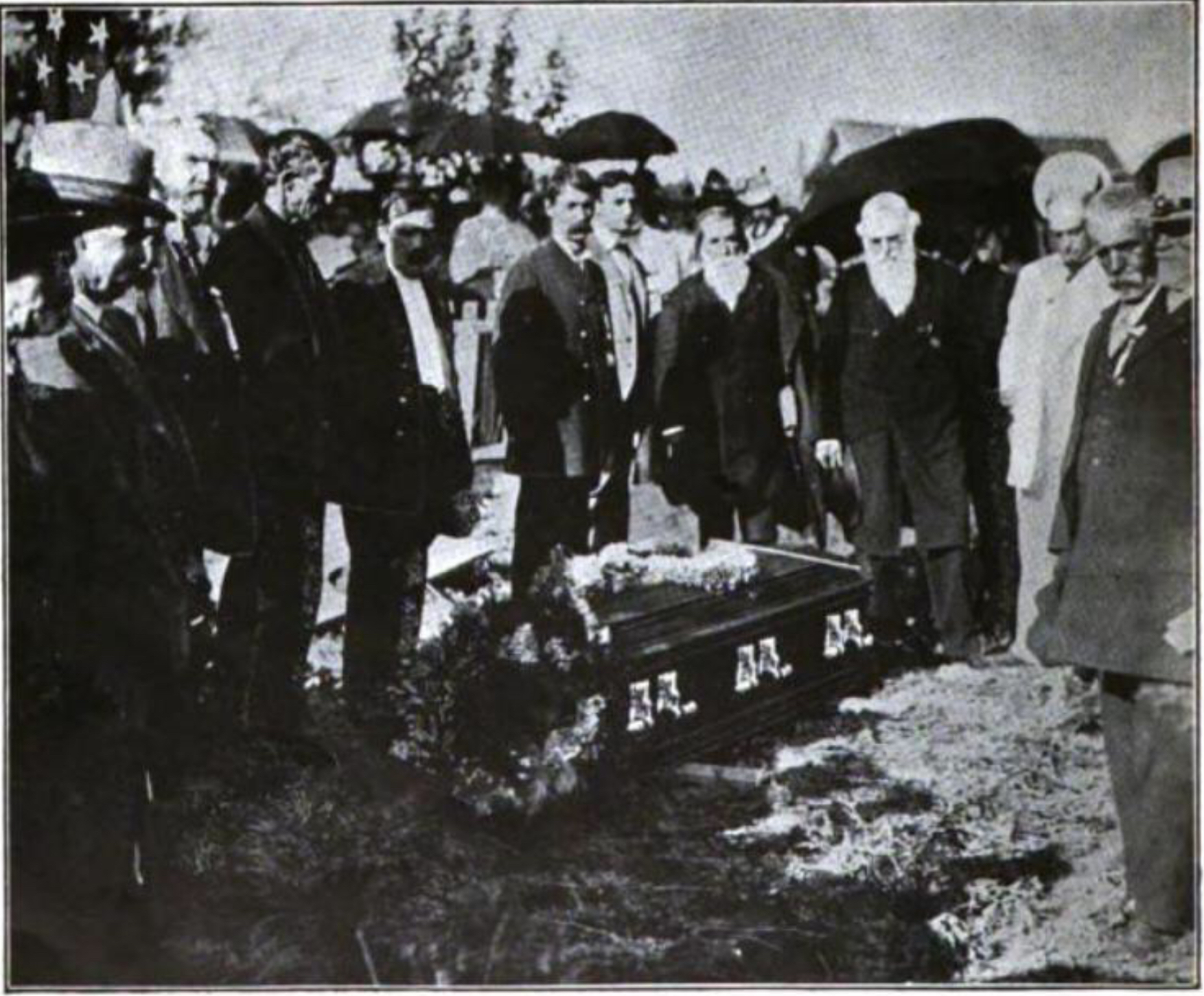
Rev. Joshua Young says the benediction over reburial of John Brown's collaborators.

== Sources ==
- Graham, Lorenz B. (1980). John Brown, A Cry for Freedom. New York: Thomas Y. Crowell. ISBN 978-0-690-04023-4.
