= John Edwin Cook =

American abolitionist (1830–1859)

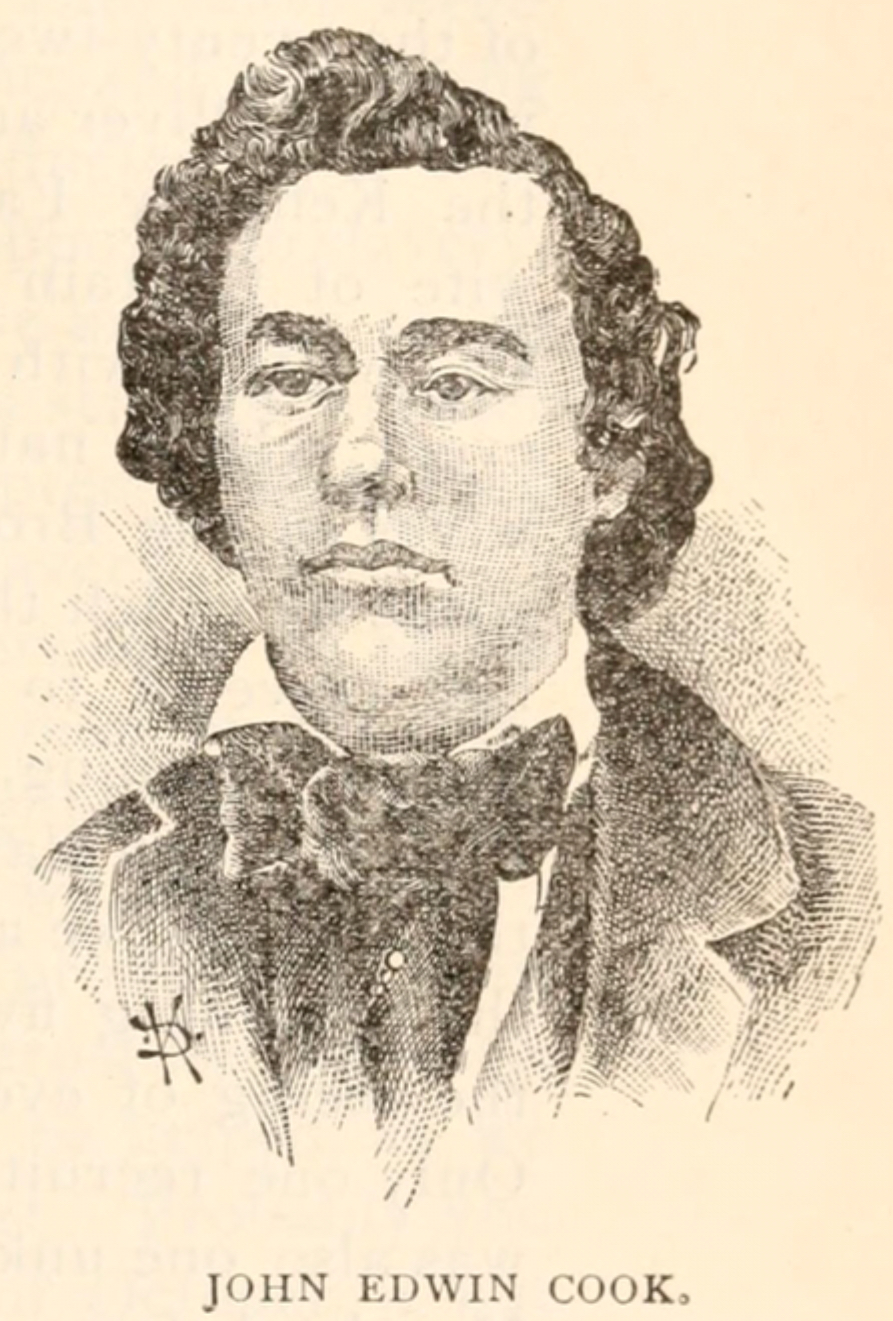
- Born: May 12, 1829; Connecticut, U.S.
- Died: December 16, 1859 (aged 30); Charles Town, Virginia (now West Virginia), U.S.
- Known for: Raid on Harpers Ferry
- Criminal charges: Murder, treason against the Commonwealth of Virginia, and inciting a slave insurrection
- Criminal penalty: Death by hanging
- Criminal status: Executed

John Edwin Cook (May 12, 1829 – December 16, 1859) was one of John Brown's raiders who participated fully in his raid on Harpers Ferry.

== Biography ==
He was the youngest of seven children of Nathaniel and Mary Cook, of Haddam, Connecticut. He attended classes at the Brainerd Academy and taught Sunday school at the Haddam Congregational Church. He began studying law at Yale College, but did not graduate. He worked as a law clerk for an attorney in Brooklyn, but did not stay long.

According to Steven Lubet, his contact with the abolitionist movement began with his attending sermons of Henry Ward Beecher, a celebrity and brother of Harriet Beecher Stowe, based on Brooklyn. When the fighting of the Bleeding Kansas period broke out in the 1850s, he abandoned his law career and moved to Kansas. He participated in a lot of combat, but was perceived as "brave, conceited, and boastful".

Cook met John Brown in Kansas in 1856. He joined free-state militias, spent a winter in Lawrence and while he did not participate in the Pottawatomie massacre, he was with Brown on other expeditions. Brown saw that Cook could be exceptionally useful.

At Brown's suggestion, Cook went to Harpers Ferry in June 1858, renting a boardinghouse room under his own name. He worked as a lock tender, schoolteacher, private writing tutor, and peddlar. He impregnated his landlady's daughter, marrying her before the child was born. According to Lubet, he was "an honorable husband and a devoted father".} He was Brown's scout, especially of the armory and arsenal. He was also the only one of Brown's men who had a wife and child.

Once the raid started, Cook's job was to go to Beall-Air, there to take its owner, Lewis Washington, George Washington's great-grandnephew, captive and set free his slaves. (Cook, who had lived in Harpers Ferry for about a year, was the only one who knew how to navigate the roads at night, and he had also met Washington,} His party then proceeded to do the same with a neighbor, and then set out on the return to Harpers Ferry. After a brief rest there he was sent to Maryland to rescue another lot of slaves, but by then it was clear the raid was failing and there was no reason for him to follow his instructions.

Cook and five others—Tidd, Osborne Anderson, Owen Brown, Barclay Coppock, and Merriam—attempted to escape northwards into Maryland and Pennsylvania. Cook was captured—he was briefly America's most wanted man, and a large reward had been announced, which was later awarded—and taken to Charles Town to face charges. He faced the same charges John Brown did: murder, inciting a slave insurrection, and treason against the Commonwealth of Virginia.

== Cook betrays his colleagues ==
Cook has a posthumous bad reputation because, alone among Brown's raiders, he gave a complete confession, naming all names involved, including those that were still at large. His brother-in-law, the pro-slavery Governor of Indiana Ashbel Willard, came to Charles Town and arranged to have Cook's confession printed, in the hope of obtaining mercy from the court, or a pardon from the Governor. The strategy was not successful and Cook was tried, convicted of all charges except treason, and executed. His confession accomplished nothing in terms of obtaining any mercy from the court.

No church in Brooklyn, where his body was sent, would allow a funeral to be held, so it was held in a private house.}
