= Osborne Perry Anderson =

African-American abolitionist (1830–1872)

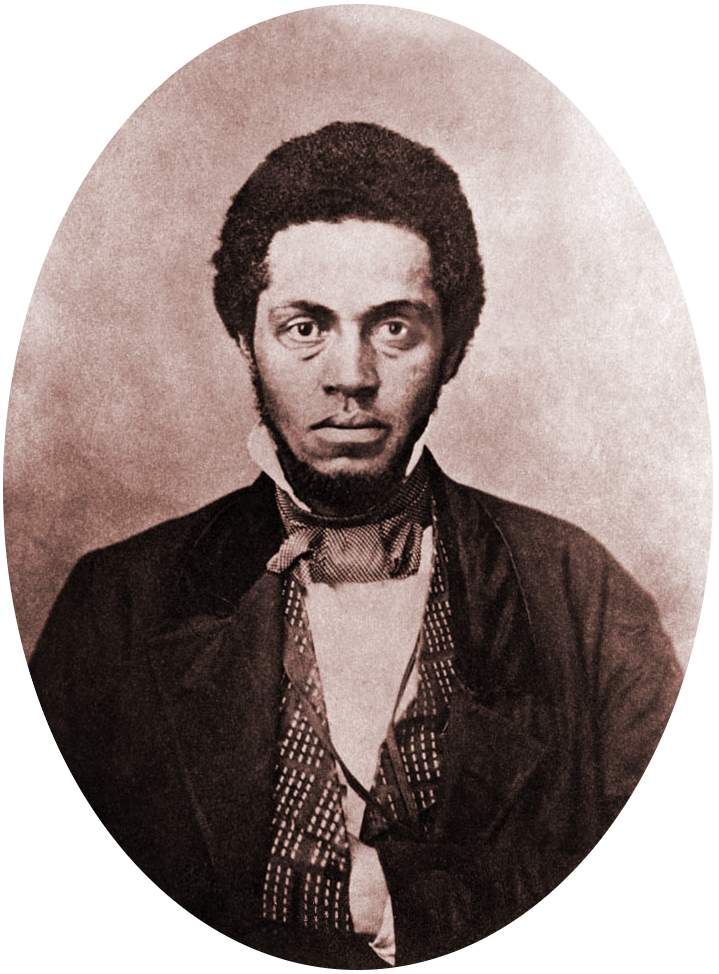
Osborne Perry Anderson

Osborne Perry Anderson (July 27, 1830 – December 11, 1872) was an African-American abolitionist and the only surviving African-American member of John Brown's raid on Harpers Ferry. He became a soldier in the Union Army during the American Civil War.

== Early life ==
In 1830 Anderson was born a free African American in West Fallow Field Township, Chester County, Pennsylvania. He completed basic schooling and later attended Oberlin College in Ohio, after which he moved to Chatham in Canada West (now Ontario) in 1850 and opened shop as a printer. This skill served him later as an abolitionist. A different source says it was 1851 that he moved to Canada, where he worked for Mary Ann Shadd Cary's Provincial Freeman newspaper.

The same year, he was a member of the Chatham Vigilance Committee that sought to prevent former slaves from being returned to the United States and brought back into slavery, such as the case of Sylvanus Demarest.

== John Brown and the raid on Harpers Ferry ==
In May 1858, Anderson met John Brown and learned of the revolution that he was planning at a meeting in Chatham. Because of his writing skills Anderson was appointed as the recording secretary at several of the meetings and was eventually promoted to a member of Brown's provisional congress.

During the raid, Col. Lewis Washington, great grand-nephew of George Washington, was taken hostage by the raiders, and surrendered to Anderson the sword of Frederick the Great and pistols presented by General Lafayette to General Washington. John Brown later brandished the sword while commanding his men at Harpers Ferry.

During the raid on Harpers Ferry Anderson was stationed with Albert Hazlett, and once it became apparent to them that the raid was a failure they both retreated to Pennsylvania. Hazlett was later captured and hanged.

== A Voice from Harpers Ferry ==
Of the slaves who followed us to the Ferry, some were sent to help remove stores, and the others were drawn up in a circle around the engine-house, at one time, where they were, by Captain Brown's order, furnished by me with pikes, mostly, and acted as a guard to the prisoners to prevent their escape, which they did. As in the war of the American Revolution, the first blood shed was a black man's, Crispus Attucks', so at Harpers Ferry, the first blood shed by our party, after the arrival of the United States troops, was that of a slave. In the beginning of the encounter, and before the troops had fairly emerged from the bridge, a slave was shot. I saw him fall. Phil, the slave who died in prison, with fear, as it was reported, was wounded at the Ferry, and died from the effects of it... The first report of the number of 'insurrectionists' killed was seventeen, which showed that several slaves were killed; for there were only ten of the men that belonged to the Kennedy Farm who lost their lives at the Ferry, namely: John Henri Kagi, Jerry Anderson, Watson Brown, Oliver Brown, Stewart Taylor, Adolphus Thompson, William Thompson, William Leeman, all eight whites, and Dangerfield Newby and Sherrard Lewis Leary, both colored. The rest reported dead, according to their own showing, were colored.

After the failed raid, Anderson went on to publish an account of the events, titled A Voice From Harper's Ferry. The book describes the conditions that were present at the Harper's Ferry raid, including the training, the supplies that were available, and the events that led up to and followed the raid. In it, he says he was the only surviving person who was with Brown during the entire raid.

Though Anderson did not name the friends who aided his escape in his account, later analysis concluded that William C. Goodridge, a conductor on the Underground Railroad, hid him in York, Pennsylvania, then sent him by rail to Philadelphia. Anderson proceeded from there to Canada.

== Later life ==
Upon the start of the Civil War Anderson became a noncommissioned officer of the Union Army. In October 1872, "the colored citizens of Philadelphia" took up a collection of $69 (~$1,854 in 2025) to help him; in thanking them on October 20, he indicates that his health is poor ("Should Providence spare my life..."), and the newspaper described him as in "feeble health" and "on his way to the South". In Washington D.C. two collections produced over $150. Within a week he died, in Washington, from tuberculosis and lack of care. He was interred at Columbian Harmony Cemetery. All the bodies from that cemetery were moved to National Harmony Memorial Park in Landover, Maryland. The exact location of his remains in the cemetery is unknown as most of the reburials were in the nature of a mass grave. His gravestone marker, if there was one, was sold with the others as scrap and probably ended up as "rip-rap" securing the Potomac shoreline of Stuart Plantation. There is a more recent memorial, but it is almost certainly not located over his remains.

== Works ==
- Anderson, Osborne Perry (1861). A Voice from Harper's Ferry . Boston – via Wikisource. [scan ]

== See also ==
- John Brown's raiders

== Legacy ==
- The Journals of Osborne P. Anderson, a play by Ted Lange, was produced in Winston-Salem, North Carolina, in 2015.
