= Francis Jackson Meriam =

American abolitionist, John Brown's Raider, and Civil War officer

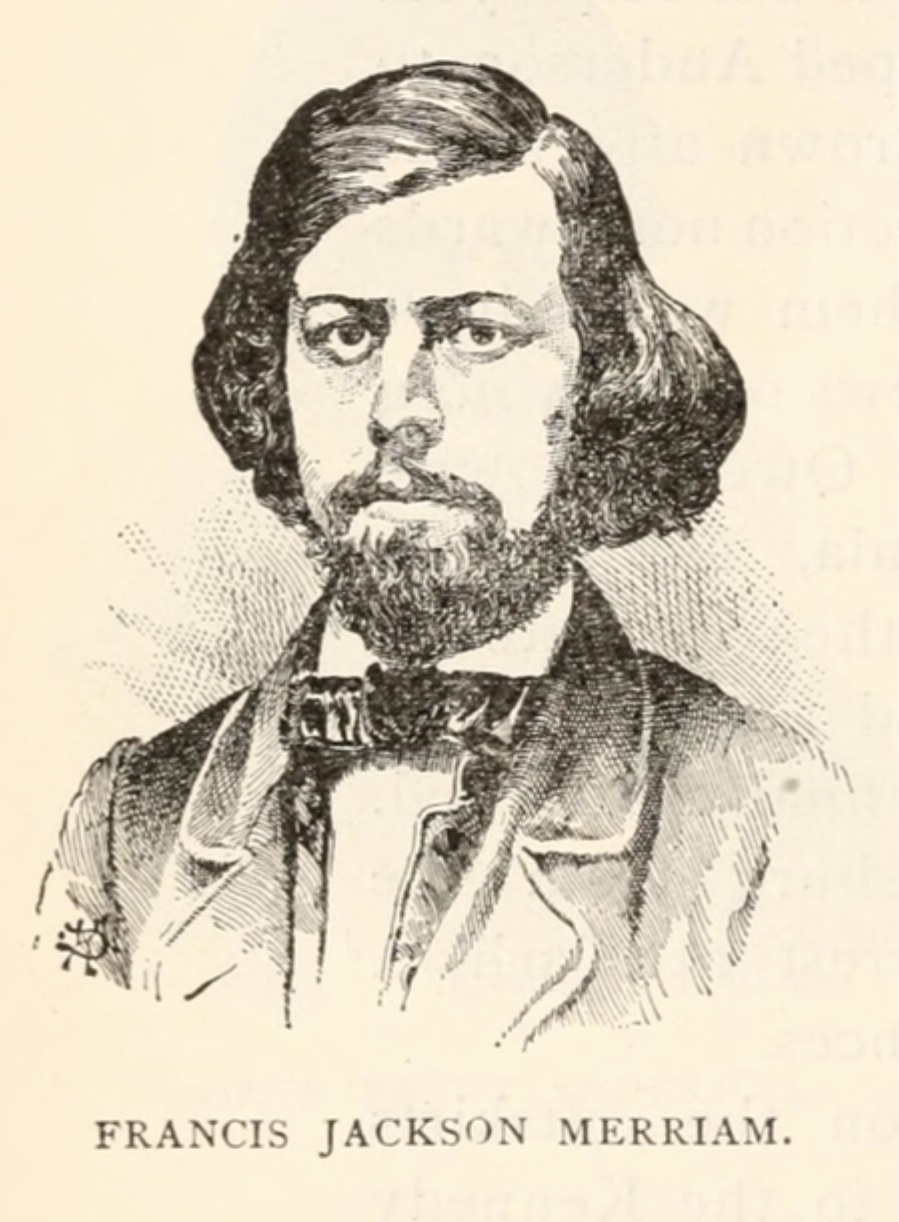

Francis Jackson Meriam (sometimes misspelled Merriam) was an American abolitionist, born on November 17, 1837, in Framingham, Massachusetts, and died on November 28, 1865, in New York City. He was named for his grandfather, Francis Jackson, who had been president of the American Anti-Slavery Society. Hinton describes him as "handsome, well-to-do, cultivated, and traveled". Instead of college, he lived in Paris for some time. In contrast, Sanborn described him as "enthusiastic and resolute, but with little judgment, and in feeble health; altogether, one would say, a very unfit person to take part actively in Brown’s enterprise." He was blind in one eye. He was the only one of John Brown's raiders who helped him financially.

== Participation in John Brown's raid ==
Meriam is unique among Brown's raiders, as so far as is known, he is the only one to have sent Brown an application letter, asking to participate. He had previously gone to Kansas with a letter of introduction from Wendell Phillips, hoping to meet Brown, but did not find him. He wrote to John Brown on December 23, 1858, that he was going to Haiti for a few months. He continued: "I already consider this [Brown's project] the whole present business of my life. I am entirely free from any family ties which would impede my action. I was much disappointed in not meeting you in Kansas last winter, with a letter of recommendation from Wendell Phillips. Immediately upon my return in the spring, I should wish to be employed in any manner to be of service to you; and, if convenient, to go through your system of training which I propose studying."

In October 1859 he participated in the raid on Harpers Ferry led by John Brown. He remained at the Kennedy Farm in Maryland, "to guard the arms and ammunition stored on the premises, until it should be time to move them." Once he learned the raid turned badly, he managed to escape.

== After Harpers Ferry ==
During the Civil War, Meriam became a Captain in the Union Army in the 3rd South Carolina Colored Infantry Regiment (at the time, all colored units had white officers). Meriam was wounded in the leg during an engagement under Grant. After the war, he "went to Mexico to join [Benito] Juárez in 1865. He has not since been heard from."
