= Annie Brown =

Daughter of abolitionist John Brown (1843–1926)

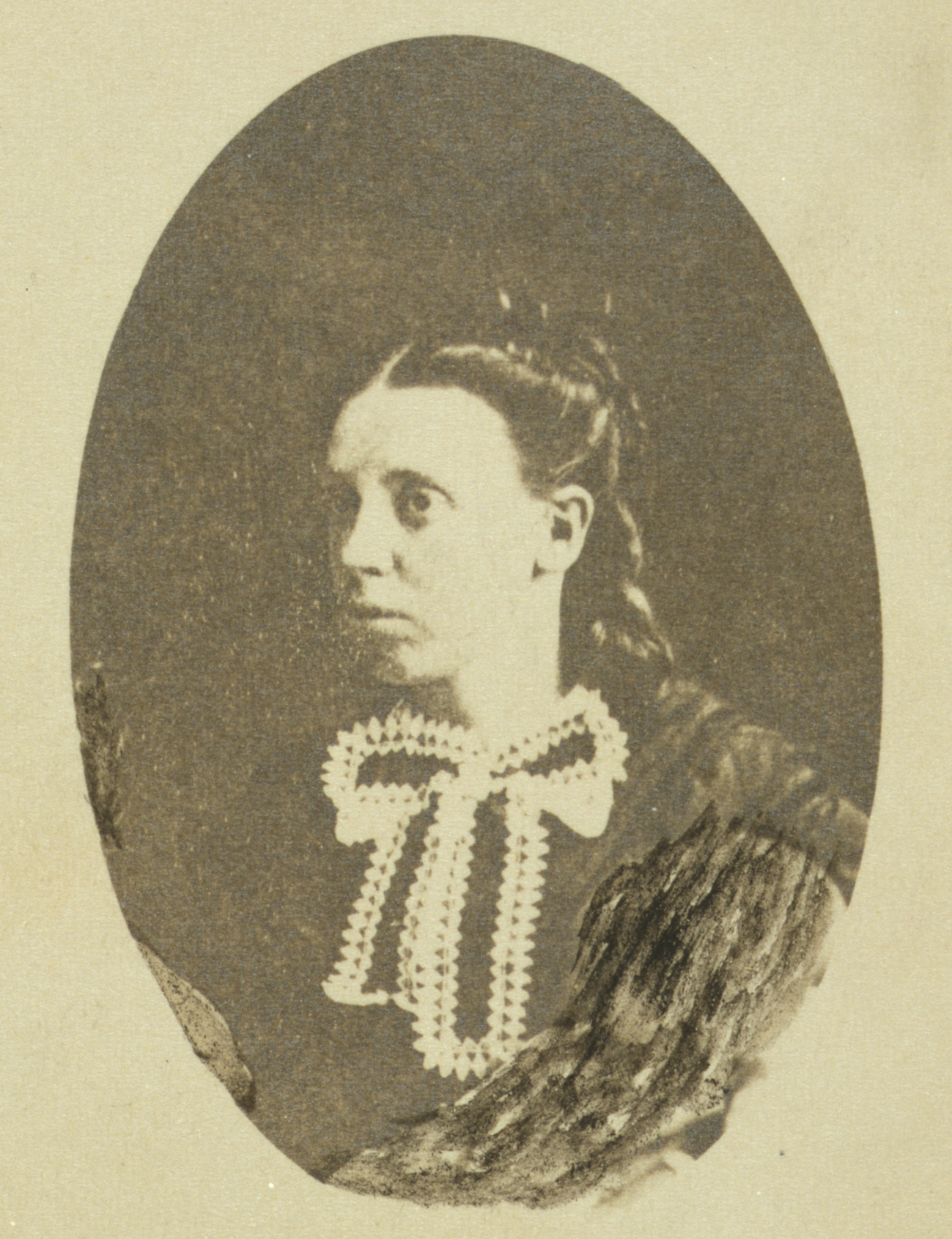
Portrait, c. 1860

Annie Brown (December 23, 1843, in Richfield, Ohio – October 3, 1926, in Shively, California, United States) was the 15th child of abolitionist John Brown. Her mother, Mary Ann Day, was Brown's second wife. Annie Brown was vital to her father's plans in preparations for his raid on Harpers Ferry, Virginia in 1859. She was a part of Brown's cover story while he, some of his family, and members of the "Provisional Army" (the party of 21 men Brown would utilize in the raid) were all living at the Kennedy Farm in Maryland. She married Samuel Sylvester Adams in 1869 and lived a private life in California until her death in 1926. They had five daughters: Vivian, Bertha, Lolita, Grace, and Sarah; and three sons: John, Samuel, and Landon.

== Involvement in the Harpers Ferry Raid ==
Annie Brown was only 15 years old in the summer 1859, the year her father, John Brown, planned to raid the U.S. Arsenal and Armory in Harpers Ferry. She and her sister-in-law Martha, the wife of Oliver Brown, came to Maryland to assist John Brown at a rented farmhouse in Washington County. The house, known as the Kennedy Farm or Kennedy Farmhouse, was set back off the road, but not greatly. Annie and Martha arrived at the farmhouse on July 19, 1859. Brown wanted women on the farm, saying it would be "indispensable to have some women of our own family with us for a short time" and that they should come right away as "It will be likely to prove the most valuable service you can ever render the world." The presence of women would normalize the household scene on the Kennedy farm and hopefully displace any suspicions of a house full of men. At the Kennedy house, there was no interior stairway to the second floor at that time, and forced the men of Brown's party to use a ladder into a window, or an exterior staircase which apparently drew a few neighbors' eyes.

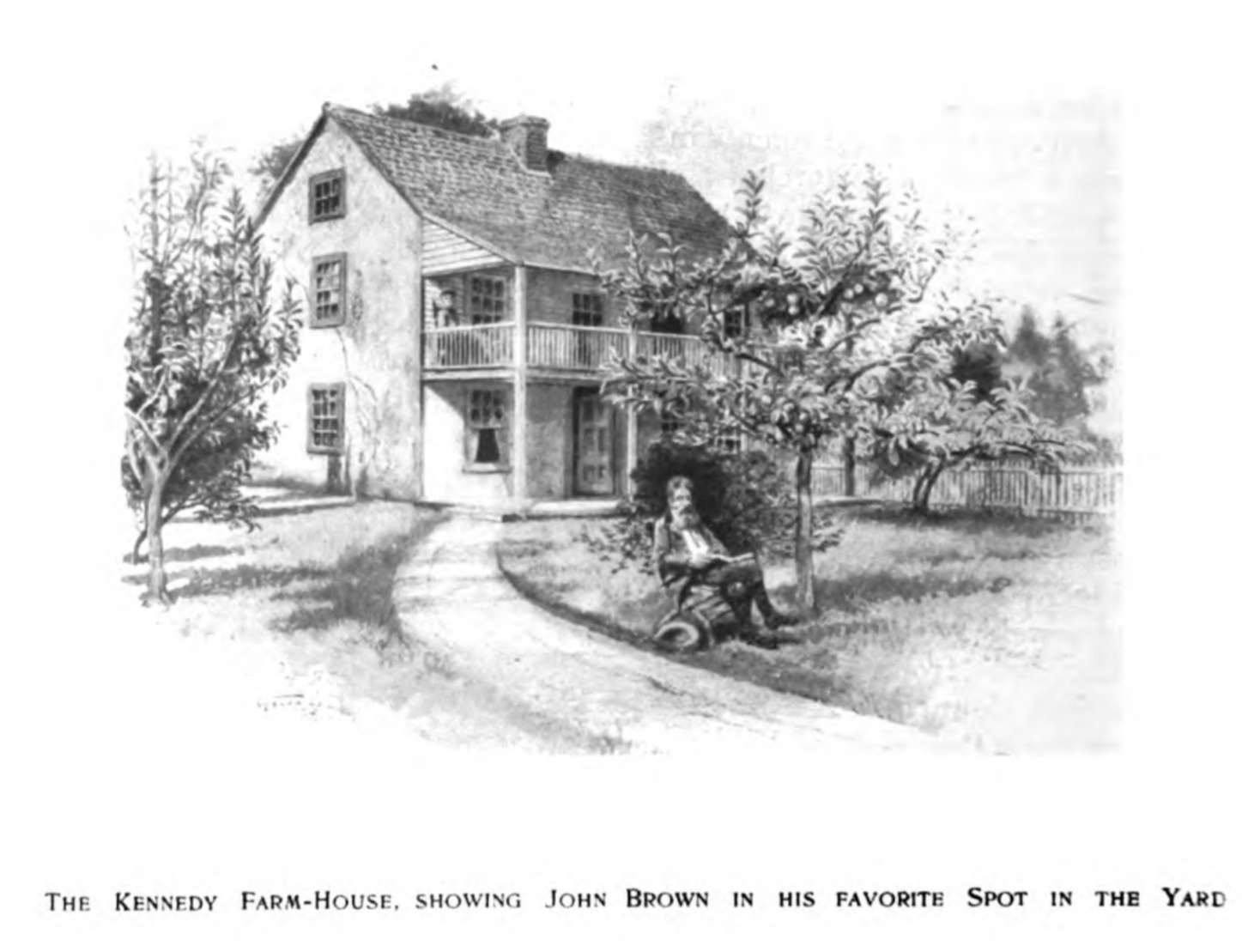
The Kennedy Farmhouse as it may have looked in 1859 when the Browns and the raiders lived there.

While living here Annie Brown was, as historian Bonnie Laughlin-Schultz summarized, a "lookout and cook, antislavery idealist and laundress." More than that, however, Annie proved herself unique among women of her time. While her older sister Ruth Brown married and became a housewife in the usual manner, Annie became an active agent for her father who kept house not for a husband, but to keep secret the planning of a violent, anti-slavery activity. This way of housekeeping was more than a rhetorical means of staking out a woman's place in the anti-slavery movement, but also disguised her own personal involvement in it from the world. In her own words, Brown recalled "I was there to keep the outside world from discovering that John Brown and his men were in their neighborhood."
