= Mary Ann Day Brown =

Widow of American abolitionist John Brown (1816–1884)

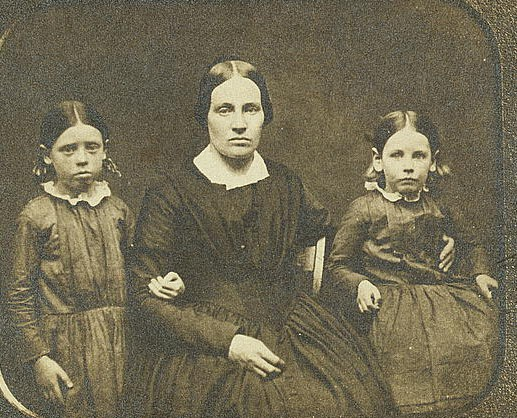
- Mary Ann Brown (née Day), wife of John Brown, married in 1833, with Annie (left) and Sarah (right) in 1851
- Born: Mary Ann Day; April 15, 1816; Granville, New York
- Died: February 29, 1884 (aged 67)
- Resting place: Madronia Cemetery, Saratoga, California
- Occupations: Abolitionist, Underground Railroad conductor, California pioneer
- Spouse: John Brown (m. 1833; died 1859)
- Children: 13, including Watson Brown

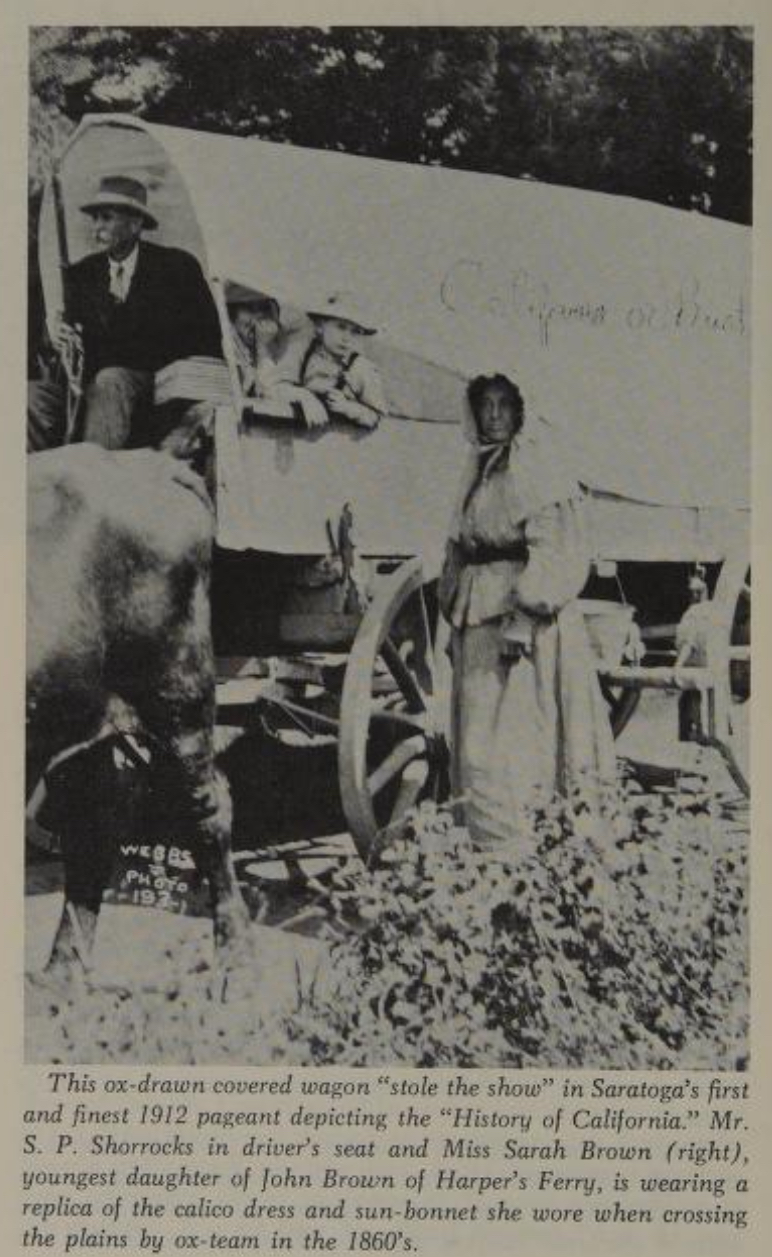
Sarah Brown in 1912, recreating the conditions of their trip to California. (Dress and covered wagon are replicas.)

Mary Ann Day Brown (April 15, 1816 – February 29, 1884) was the second wife of abolitionist John Brown, leader of a raid on Harpers Ferry, Virginia (since 1863, West Virginia), who attempted to start a campaign of liberating enslaved people in the South. Married at age 17, Mary raised 5 stepchildren and an additional 13 children born during her marriage. She supported her husband's activities by managing the family farm while he was away, which he often was. Mary and her husband helped enslaved African Americans escape slavery via the Underground Railroad. The couple lived in Pennsylvania, Ohio, and in the abolitionist settlement of North Elba, New York. After the execution of her husband, she moved to California and became a pioneer of development there.

== Early life ==
Mary Ann Day was born on April 15, 1816, in Granville in Washington County, New York, to Mary and Charles Day, a farmer and blacksmith. When she was a young girl, she moved with her parents to Meadville in Crawford County, Pennsylvania.

When she was sixteen, she occasionally came to abolitionist John Brown's house in New Richmond, Pennsylvania, to work on the spinning wheel. Her sister was his housekeeper. Mary was described as tall and sturdy, with striking black hair. John found her to be a hard worker and practical. A shy man, John wrote a letter to her in which he asked her to marry him.

== Marriage and children ==
At the age of 17, Mary Ann Day was married on June 14 or July 11, 1833, in Crawford County, Pennsylvania, to John Brown, who was a widower previously married to Dianthe Lusk.

=== Stepchildren ===
Mary acquired five stepchildren, aged two to twelve, upon her marriage to John Brown.

- John Brown, Jr., was born in Hudson, Ohio, on July 25, 1821. He attended the Grand River Institute in Austinburg, Ohio. He attempted to keep accurate records of his father's disorganized business proceedings in the 1840s and became a teacher later in life. He married Wealthy Hotchkiss in 1847. As a Captain in a Kansas cavalry unit, he was the only one of the Brown's children to serve in the Civil War. He died May 3, 1895.
- Jason Brown was born in Hudson, Ohio, on January 19, 1823. Jason was a humanitarian and a pacifist. He married Ellen Sherbondy in 1847 and they had descendants. He died on December 24, 1912.
- Owen Brown was born in Hudson, Ohio, on November 4, 1824. He participated in the Kansas battles and came with his father to Harpers Ferry. During the raid on Harpers Ferry, he stayed at the Kennedy Farm and led four others to safety when the failure of the raid became apparent. He died in Pasadena, California, on January 8, 1889.
- Ruth Brown was born in New Richmond, Pennsylvania, on February 18, 1829. She also attended the Grand River Institute. She married Henry Thompson on September 26, 1850, and they had descendants. She died on January 18, 1904.
- Frederick Brown (the second) was born in New Richmond, Pennsylvania, on December 31, 1830. He was shot and killed by Martin White in Osawatomie, Kansas, on August 30, 1856, and was buried there.

=== Mary's own children ===
Mary had thirteen children with John. Six of them did not survive to adulthood. Three more died before John's death. The children were:

- Sarah Brown was born in New Richmond, Pennsylvania, on May 11, 1834. At age nine, she died in Richfield, Ohio, of dysentery.
- Watson Brown was born in Franklin Mills, Ohio, on October 7, 1835. He married Isabella Thompson in September 1858. He participated in the raid on Harpers Ferry and died on October 19, 1859, of wounds that he sustained.
- Salmon Brown was born in Hudson, Ohio, on October 2, 1836. He married Abbie C. Hinckley in September 1858 and they had descendants. He took part in the Kansas fighting. He died in Portland, Oregon, on May 10, 1919.
- Charles Brown was born in Hudson, Ohio, on November 3, 1837. He died in Richmond, Ohio, of dysentery on September 11, 1843 at the age of 5.
- Oliver Brown was born in Franklin Mills, Ohio, on March 9, 1839. He married Martha Brewster on April 7, 1858. Oliver participated in the raid on Harpers Ferry and died from wounds received there on October 17, 1859.
- Peter Brown was born in Hudson, Ohio, on December 7, 1840. He died of dysentery at age two on September 22, 1843, and was buried in Richfield, Ohio.
- Austin Brown was born in Richfield, Ohio, on September 14, 1842. He died of dysentery at age one, September 27, 1843.
- Annie Brown was born in Richfield, Ohio, on December 23, 1843. She was a lookout at Kennedy Farm before the raid on Harpers Ferry to alleviate concerns of nearby residents. She married Samuel Adams and they had descendants. Annie died October 5, 1926, and was buried in Shively, California.
- Amelia Brown was born June 22, 1845, and was accidentally scalded to death on October 30, 1846. She was buried in Akron, Ohio.
- Sarah Brown (the second) was born in Akron, Ohio, on September 11, 1846. She never married and died in 1916.
- Ellen Brown (the first) was born in Springfield, Massachusetts, on April 26, 1848. She died of consumption in her father's arms on April 30, 1849.
- Infant son (unnamed) was born in Akron, Ohio, on April 26, 1852, and died of whooping cough 21 days after his birth.
- Ellen Brown (the second) was born in Akron, Ohio, on September 25, 1854. She married James Fablinger in 1876. She died on July 16, 1916.

== Ohio ==
For the first couple of years of marriage, the Browns lived in New Richmond, Pennsylvania. In May 1835, they moved to Franklin Mills, Ohio (later renamed Kent, Ohio), and to Richfield, Ohio, in 1842. At that time, the Browns had twelve living children. They also lived in John's home town of Hudson, Ohio, where he had lived from 1805 to 1821.

Anti-slavery institutions were established by William Lloyd Garrison in the early 1830s with the founding of The Liberator newspaper and the American Anti-Slavery Society. In the mid-1830s, the Browns were subscribers of the newspaper and Mary was familiar with her husband's and Garrison's positions against slavery. Few people supported the anti-slavery movement in the 1840s and 1850s. Influenced by the Second Great Awakening, Mary believed it important to bring an end to slavery. She saw African Americans as her equals.

While her husband and sons were away fighting against slavery, she remained at home and worked to support the family, as well as running her household and delivering and raising children. John considered his wife a partner and a "fast and faithful affectionate friend" who made it possible for him to focus on his fight against slavery. He recognized that she took on a life of "poverty, trials, discredit, and sore afflictions" due to his commitments, which resulted in periods of illness and loss.

Their children were raised to be truthful, resist temptation, improve morally, and be useful. Four of her children died in 1843 and another two children died by 1849. A religious marker was placed in the cemetery at Richfield, Ohio. Believed to have been written by John, the inscription is: "Through all the dreary night of death / In peaceful slumbers may you rest, / And when eternal day shall dawn / And shades and death have past and gone, / O may you then with glad surprise / In God's own image wake and rise."

In another transition, Mary and the children moved to Akron, Ohio, into a house owned by Simon Perkins, who started a wool business with John in Springfield, Massachusetts, by 1845.

== North Elba colony ==
Gerrit Smith established a land-grant colony for African Americans at North Elba, New York, in the Adirondacks wilderness. John Brown moved to the area, with his family, to teach the men how to farm. Having suffered poor health following the death of her children, Mary was described as an invalid by visitor Richard Henry Dana Jr. in 1849. Ruth, her stepdaughter, was taking care of the children at the time. (Note: While it seems most like the visit was by Richard Henry Dana Jr., it may also have been his father Richard Henry Dana Sr.) Mary traveled to Northampton, Massachusetts, for a water cure at David Ruggles' establishment, which greatly improved her health and well-being. Unique for the times, Frederick Douglass found during his visits that the boys and girls of the family served food to family members and visitors. The boys cleared the table and washed the dishes.

John Brown and Gerrit Smith had hoped that the colony would be a place where African Americans could settle. It was difficult, however, to farm in the cold climate and it did not become a thriving community. Lyman Epps and his family were neighbors. A formerly enslaved man, Cyrus, worked for the Browns as a farmhand and lived with the family. The Browns assisted Blacks who were escaping slavery on the Underground Railroad, which became more dangerous with the passage of the Fugitive Slave Act of 1850. John Brown made his wool warehouse in Springfield, Massachusetts, an Underground Railroad site. The Brown family intended to defend North Elba against slavecatchers with weapons.

In the mid-1850s, John and most of their sons went to Kansas to fight pro-slavery factions to make the territory a free state, while Brown stayed in North Elba with her daughters and son Watson. In 1857, Franklin Sanborn commented that Mary and her daughters, Ruth and Annie, were "hardworking, self-denying, devoted women, fully sensible of the greatness of the struggle in which Capt. Brown is engaged, and willing to bear their part in it." Brown's life was one of financial hardship, and yet the family set aside money to aid African Americans in North Elba.

John returned to the east in 1856 and began canvassing for support for an anti-slavery raid in Virginia. Mary was managing the family's "hardscrabble" existence in North Elba—as he traveled through Canada and the Northern states.

Mary refused to come to the Kennedy Farm, as her husband requested. She did not answer his request at all, and did "everything in her power" to prevent her stepdaughter Annie and Oliver's wife Martha from going in her place.

== Harpers Ferry raid ==
John planned and executed the raid on Harpers Ferry on October 16, 1859. He was accompanied by their sons Oliver and Watson. Annie and daughter-in-law Martha (Oliver's wife) made preparations and cooked at the Kennedy house for the men who would participate in the raid, who were later called John Brown's raiders. The young women returned to North Elba when the raid was imminent.

The night of the raid, Mary waited at their home in North Elba for news about the fate of her husband and sons. With her were four daughters—Ruth, Annie, Sarah, and Ellen—and her daughters-in-law Martha and Bell. Ruth's husband, Henry, was injured while working with John and did not participate in the raid.

John was captured and two of their sons were killed. He was charged with murder, inciting a slave riot, and treason. When she visited him in jail in Charles Town, Virginia, Mary's likeness was sketched and her life story printed in newspapers. She became a source of interest in the country as the result of the Harpers Ferry raid. Mary met noted abolitionists and funds were raised to help support the family.

Mary was repeatedly tutored by abolitionist leaders (such as Wendell Phillips) about how they thought John Brown's wife should behave and speak, to project the image that John had his wife's unqualified support. They wrote letters for publication in her name.

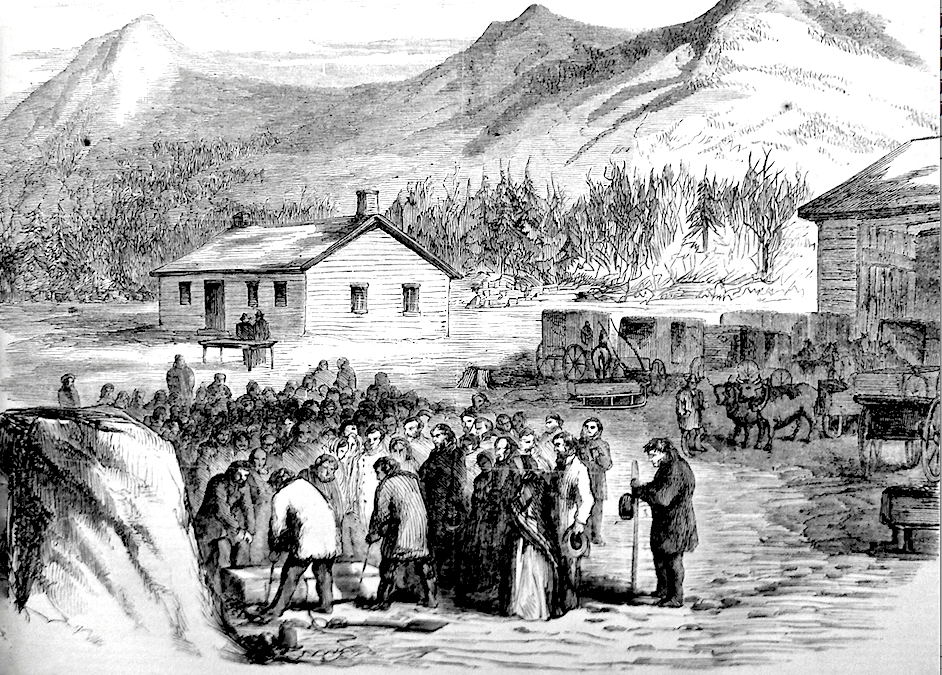
John Brown's burial, Brown family farm, North Elba, New York, December 8, 1859. Note the boulder on the left.

Found guilty of all charges, John was hanged on December 2, 1859. There were some plans to use his body for medical research, but Mary implored Henry A. Wise, the governor of Virginia, to return his remains to her and their children for burial at the family farm, as John had requested. Wise agreed. Some abolitionists—like Wendell Phillips—wanted him to be buried in Mount Auburn Cemetery in Cambridge, Massachusetts, with a monument and lavish funeral, that would be a catalyst for fund-raising for the anti-slavery movement.

== California ==
After the American Civil War, she and her daughters abstained from drinking and were members of temperance societies in their communities. Mary, her son Salmon, and her daughter-in-law Abbie Hinckley Brown decided to travel to California. Abbie's uncle had declared that he found it to be a "land of gold opportunity". Mary and the couple sold their farms and headed west with her daughters Sarah and Annie, hoping that it would be a fresh start and an escape from John Brown's notoriety.

They spent the winter in Iowa and were discovered by Confederate sympathizers who were believed to have poisoned two ewes and planned to kill Salmon. On September 22, 1864, The New York Tribune reported that there was an unconfirmed rumor that the Brown family was murdered by Missouri guerillas. Instead, the Browns traveled by wagon to the Union post at Soda Springs, Idaho, arriving three hours before their pursuers. Soldiers traveled with the family to Nevada, a 200 miles (320 km) trip. They continued their journey along the California Trail and arrived at Red Bluff, California, where they were welcomed by the residents. They received groceries and supplies and Salmon obtained work immediately after their arrival. She was harassed by pro-slavery people while in Red Bluff and decided to leave the town. She moved to Rohnerville, California, and then Saratoga.

In 1882, she made a trip east. She was honored at public receptions in Chicago and Kansas, and visited several places associated with her life and that of her husband. While at the house of her son John Jr. in Ohio, the lost body of her son Watson was unexpectedly brought to her, and she took it with her to North Elba, burying him beside his father.

== Death ==
Mary Ann Day Brown died on February 29, 1884, and was buried in the Madronia Cemetery in Saratoga, California. She had requested to be buried alongside her husband, if it was not too costly or difficult. Her funeral was heavily attended.

== Legacy ==
Historian Stephen B. Oates called her a "loyal, self-sacrificing wife", and stated, "She had been taught since childhood that a woman's task was to bear children, tend her house, and obey her husband. Thus she subordinated herself completely to Brown's will... enduring his intractable ways."

Her correspondence shows that she was devoted to her husband and abolitionism. Author John Newton stated in Captain John Brown (1902) that she bore "hardship, poverty, prolonged separation from her husband, yea, even the loss of her noble sons to further the sacred cause of freedom." Of her husband, Mary stated, "It is only those that are capable of appreciating his motives that can see any beauty in them."

Oswald Garrison Villard noted in his 1910 biography of her husband that Mary possessed "rugged physical health and even greater ruggedness of nature... was as truly of the stuff of which martyrs are made as was her husband".

Susan Higginbotham deals with Mary in the novel John Brown's Women.

== See also ==
- California Historical Landmarks in Tehama County
- Home of Mrs. John Brown

== Bibliography ==
- Laughlin-Schultz, Bonnie (2013). The tie that bound us : the women of John Brown's family and the legacy of radical abolitionism. Ithaca : Cornell University Press. ISBN 978-0-8014-5161-4.

== Interview ==
- Tilton, Theodore (November 25, 1859). "Interview with Mrs. Brown". The Liberator. Boston, Massachusetts. p. 2.
