= John Brown's body =

1859 execution of the U.S. abolitionist

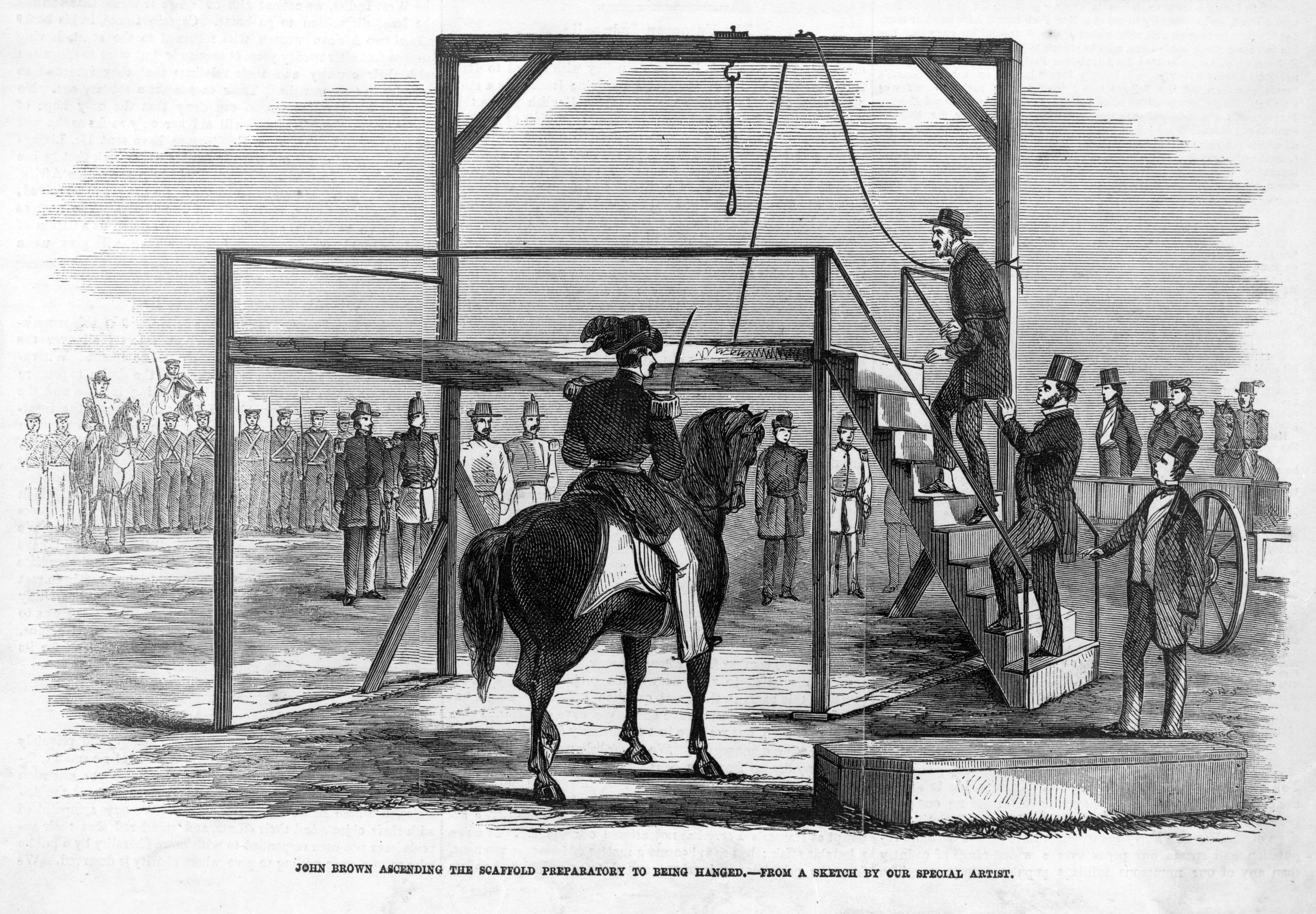
Brown ascending the scaffold. From Frank Leslie's Illustrated Newspaper, December 17, 1859.

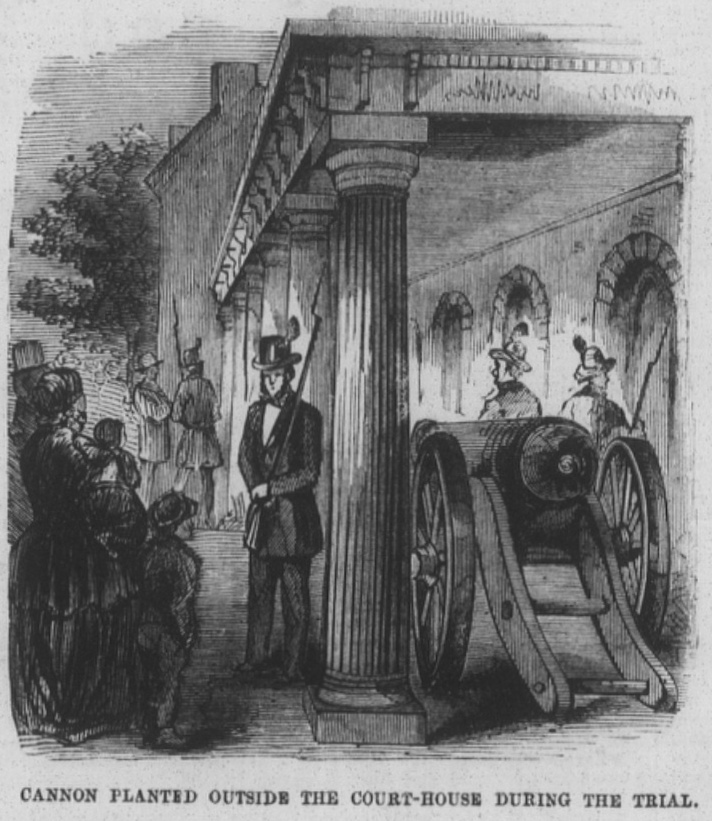
Cannon outside the Charles Town courthouse during John Brown's trial

John Brown was executed on Friday, December 2, 1859, after being found guilty by a court predominated by slaveholders. Initially, Virginia Governor Henry Wise wished to hasten Brown's execution to immediately after his trial. According to Brown's young attorney (who was also working as a spy for Northern abolitionists), George H. Hoyt, Brown himself advised him that this would be the likely outcome of his rushed trial and certain guilty verdict. Based on Brown's advice, Hoyt went to Judge Richard Parker and pointed out that since there was no active insurrection, the laws of the State of Virginia prohibited a rushed execution. As a result, Brown was permitted to live until December 2, 1859. During this time, he became a national figure, galvanizing antislavery enthusiasm in the North and exciting proslavery paranoia in the South. Many of his letters to friends, family, and associates were published, the sentiments of which had both a religious and political influence, given most of Brown's personal sentiments expressed reflected his devout Christian faith. He was tried and hanged in Charlestown, Virginia (now Charles Town, West Virginia). The indictments against him were expressed in three charges: murder, insurrection, and treason. Brown denied all three and, in a less-interested court, might have been found not guilty since he himself committed no murder and intended no insurrection, and neither was proved in his trial despite slaveholder allegations. Allegedly, Brown was the first person executed for treason in the history of the country. However, the treason charge against him was a state, not federal, charge, and Brown's lawyers challenged the viability of being found guilty of treason against the State of Virginia, given he was not a citizen of Virginia.

Mary Brown came to Charlestown while staying at Harper's Ferry and retrieved the body the following day with the assistance of antislavery associates. Before the container holding his body was received, it was necessary to inspect it because some mean-spirited Virginians started the rumor that his body had been replaced with that of a dead black man. The remains were brought by rail to Philadelphia, where the mayor arranged a decoy coffin to lead away crowds of admirers (many of whom were Black) and protestors, while the actual container with Brown's body was shipped to New York City by boat. In Manhattan, John Brown's body was prepared for burial by a Brooklyn-based Quaker, Jacob Hopper, at a facility he rented on Bowery Street. Hopper charged no fee, but as news leaked out, local people gathered souvenirs, even the screws from his Virginia coffin, which was replaced with a better coffin by his admirers. It seems that the Virginians left the noose around Brown's neck as a sign of contempt. From New York City, Brown's body was taken by rail to Vermont and then ferried across Lake Champlain to Westport, New York, accompanied by his widow Mary Brown and antislavery associates, including Wendell Phillips. After the body lay in state at the Essex County Courthouse in Elizabethtown, New York, it remained there overnight on December 6-7 and was then conveyed to his farm in North Elba, New York. The funeral took place on December 8, 1859.

== Background ==
Brown was, at the time of his execution, the most famous living American: emblem for the North, as Wendell Phillips put it, a mad traitor in the South. His trial was the first in which there was national newspaper coverage, using the still-new telegraph. Reporters and sketch artists were sent to cover the trial. Newspapers and magazines carried many articles on it.

The John Brown affair is the last major event leading up to the Civil War. In fact the Governor of Virginia Henry A. Wise, who was very much involved, thought that the Civil War could begin in 1859 in Charles Town. He moved, at considerable expense, as many Virginia militia as possible to Charles Town, which was said to resemble a military camp. However, another perspective on Wise's overloading Charlestown with militia is that he was actually fearful of an uprising of enslaved people, given that his spies found no evidence that abolitionists were coming to invade Virginia at the time. Regardless, Wise controlled news and information with a heavy hand, prohibiting journalists and reporters from entering Charlestown unless they were proslavery in sentiment. As Henry Steele Olcott later observed (after serving as an undercover reporter for the antislavery New York Daily Tribune), "Then the liberty of the press was for the first time practically destroyed in this country."

What to do with John Brown's body was a question of national significance. A modern scholar called the journey of his corpse "a media event of the highest order." Union soldiers sang "John Brown's Body" as they marched during the war.

== Dissection by medical students ==
Dr. W. C. Hicks, of the New Orleans School of Medicine, offered, in a letter to Governor Wise, to pay Virginia $500 (equivalent to $17,917 in 2025) for Brown's remains, to be used for dissection by medical students. He also pledged that once the skeleton was "properly dried and arranged", he would exhibit it throughout New England, not for money, but to "frighten every Scoundrel Abolitionist out of the country". "The medical faculty of Richmond College" also requested, on November 2, "the bodies of such as may be executed." Wise instead had the body released to Mary Ann Day Brown, John's widow, who was awaiting it in Harpers Ferry to take it home for burial. It was the corpse of a son of Brown (only much later identified as Watson) that was turned into an anatomical specimen at Winchester Medical College, with a note saying it was a message to abolitionists. The corpses of three other members of Brown's party—Shields Green, John Anthony Copeland Jr., and Jeremiah Anderson—were also used by medical students.

== Other proposals ==
The Richmond Examiner proposed that Brown's body be "chopped into small pieces, in the Chinese manner, and distributed in terrorem all over the land."

Brown wanted his body and those of his sons and the two Thompson boys burned, which he said would be much less expensive than burial, but that was not allowed in Virginia, the Sheriff said, and Mrs. Brown did not want it either. Also, she did not feel up to identifying the partially decomposed body of Oliver, dead for over a month. She rejected the repeated suggestion of Wendell Phillips, Lydia Maria Child, and others that John be buried "with impressive funeral solemnities" in Mount Auburn Cemetery in Cambridge, Massachusetts, with the erection of a monument. Also she rejected proposals to pack his body in ice, with the rope around his neck, and exhibit it in "all our principal cities and even the minor ones."

== Trip to North Elba ==
=== Harpers Ferry to Rutland, Vermont ===
Despite the "great propaganda value" of these proposed measures, Mary set off early Saturday morning, December 3, on the one daily Baltimore and Ohio express train for Baltimore—the same one Brown stopped on October 16, and Robert E. Lee took home on October 19—with her husband's body. She was accompanied by James Miller McKim and Hector Tyndale. In Baltimore she changed trains for Philadelphia, arriving about 12:30 pm. Mary intended to stop there, rest, and have the body prepared by an undertaker, "but the prospect of the body's approach produced such an excitement in that city...that the Mayor believed it would be impossible, if the body should remain," to maintain public order. Accompanied by many policemen, he met the train. Although most of the crowd awaiting its arrival consisted of sympathetic Blacks, the Mayor took a long tool box from a baggage car, covered it, and had it taken away quickly, the crowd following the sham coffin. Brown's body was taken immediately by ferry to Camden, New Jersey, and from there via the Camden & Amboy Railroad to South Amboy, New Jersey. A Quaker undertaker, Jacob M. Hopper, met the ferry from South Amboy to New York at the ferry port, The Battery. Although Hopper's studio was in Brooklyn, he rented briefly a room at another funeral establishment, McGraw and Taylor, at 163 Bowery, in Manhattan. There is a historic marker. There he removed the body from the plain coffin it came in, washed it, dressed it, and placed it in a 5 feet 10 inches (1.78 m) walnut coffin. A small crowd gathered outside the establishment. After resting Saturday night in Philadelphia Mrs. Brown continued to New York on Sunday, spending the night there with friends.

At 7 AM on Monday the 5th, Mrs. Brown, described as "quite unwell", McKim, Richard P. Hallowell, and the coffin proceeded north on the Hudson River Railroad, the oak coffin having been placed inside a pine box. They were accompanied by a reporter from the New-York Tribune and Thomas Nast, a sketch artist for Harper's and the New York Illustrated Weekly. Church bells rang and crowds gathered as they proceeded up the Hudson to Troy, New York, where they were joined by Wendell Phillips, arriving from Boston with the hope of bringing Brown's body to Boston for burial in Mount Auburn Cemetery. An impromptu announcement said this was not going to happen, since Brown had wanted to be buried at his farm. Waiting for the next train they stopped briefly at the American House hotel, where John had often stayed, and whose manager said he had been offered "tempting prices" for the signatures in his register. Another train took them to Rutland, Vermont, where they spent Monday night.

=== Rutland to North Elba ===
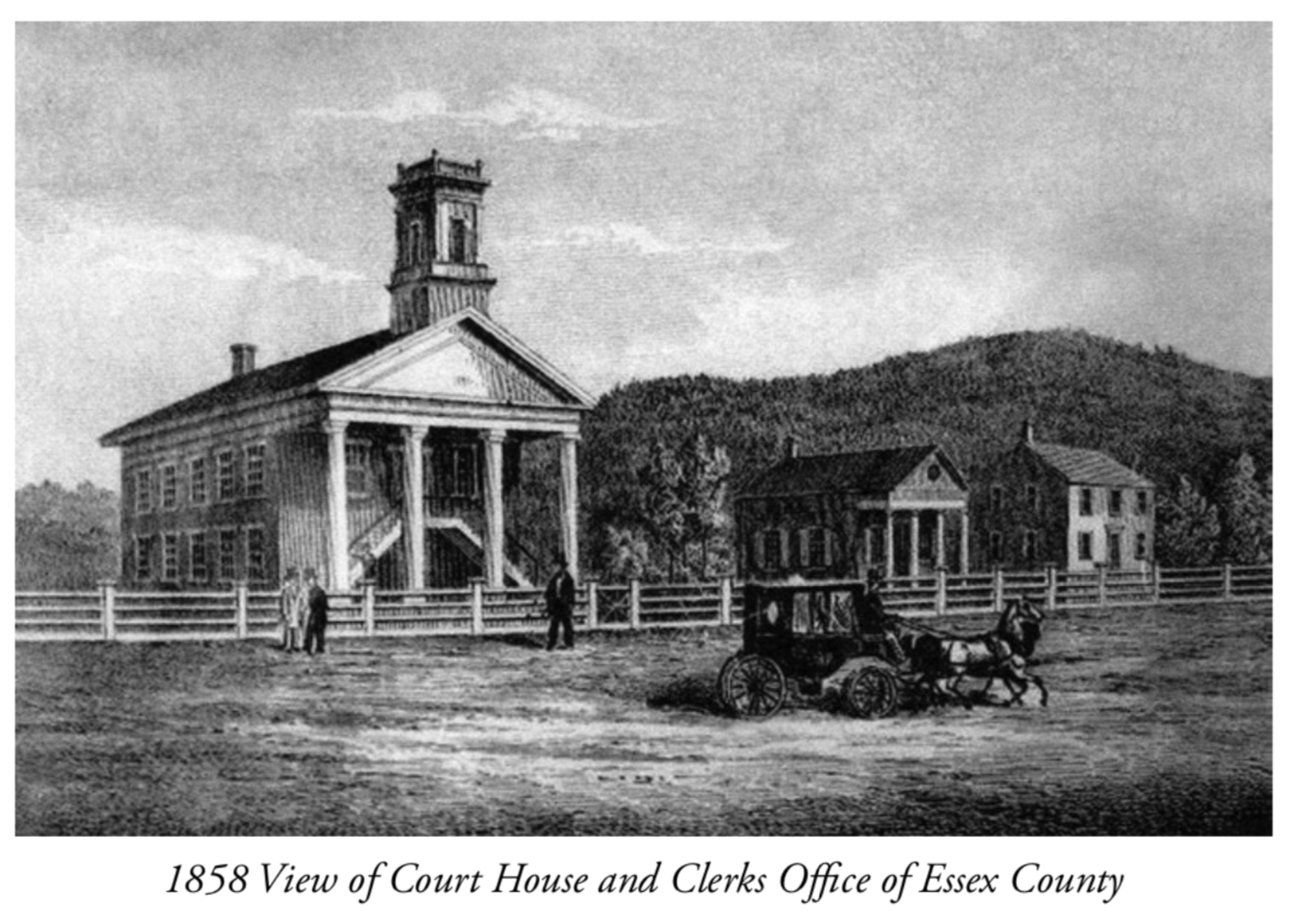
Essex County Courthouse, Elizabethtown, New York, 1858

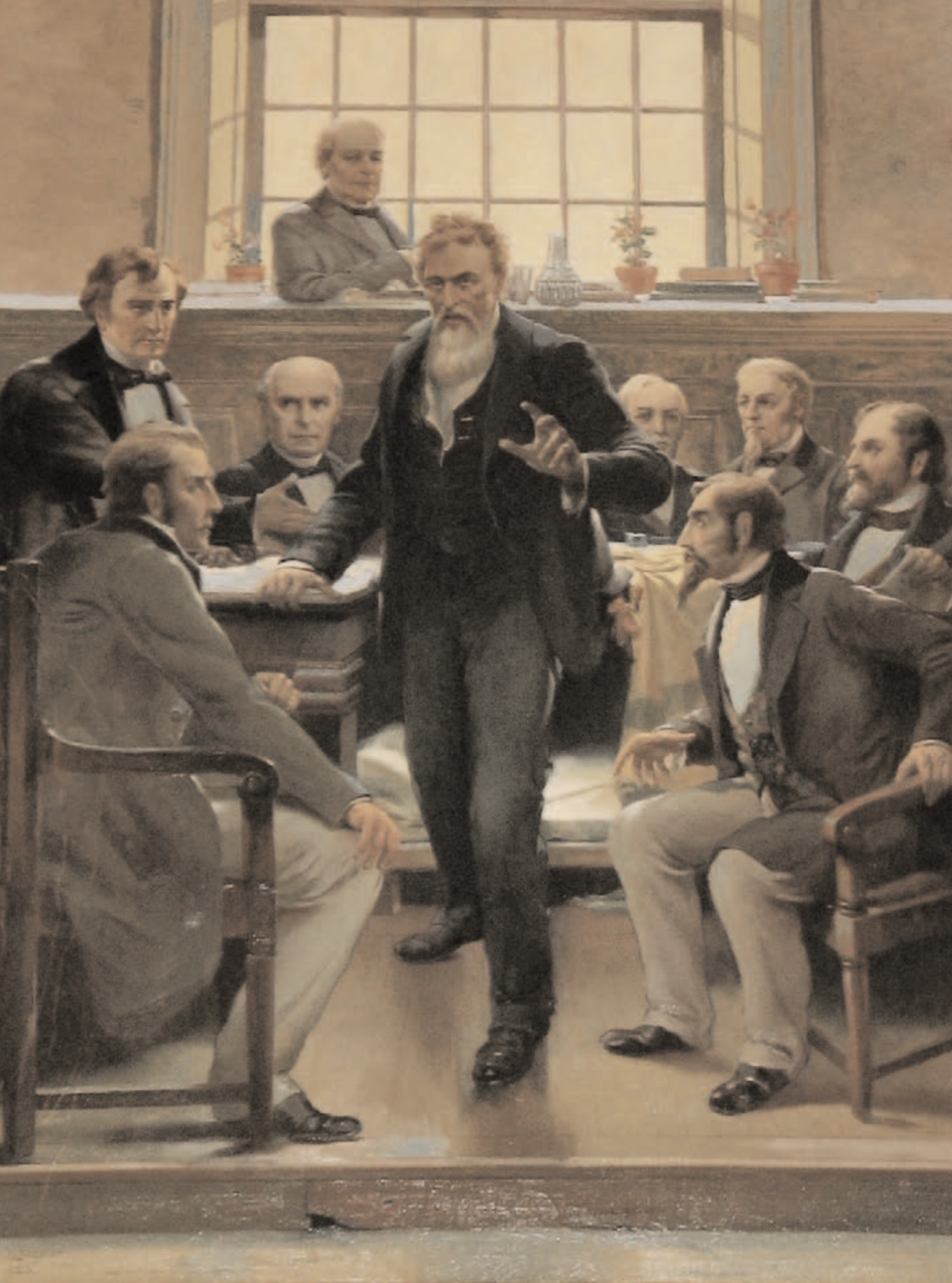
John Brown's Trial, painting hanging in the Essex County (NY) Courthouse. Note the cot behind him.

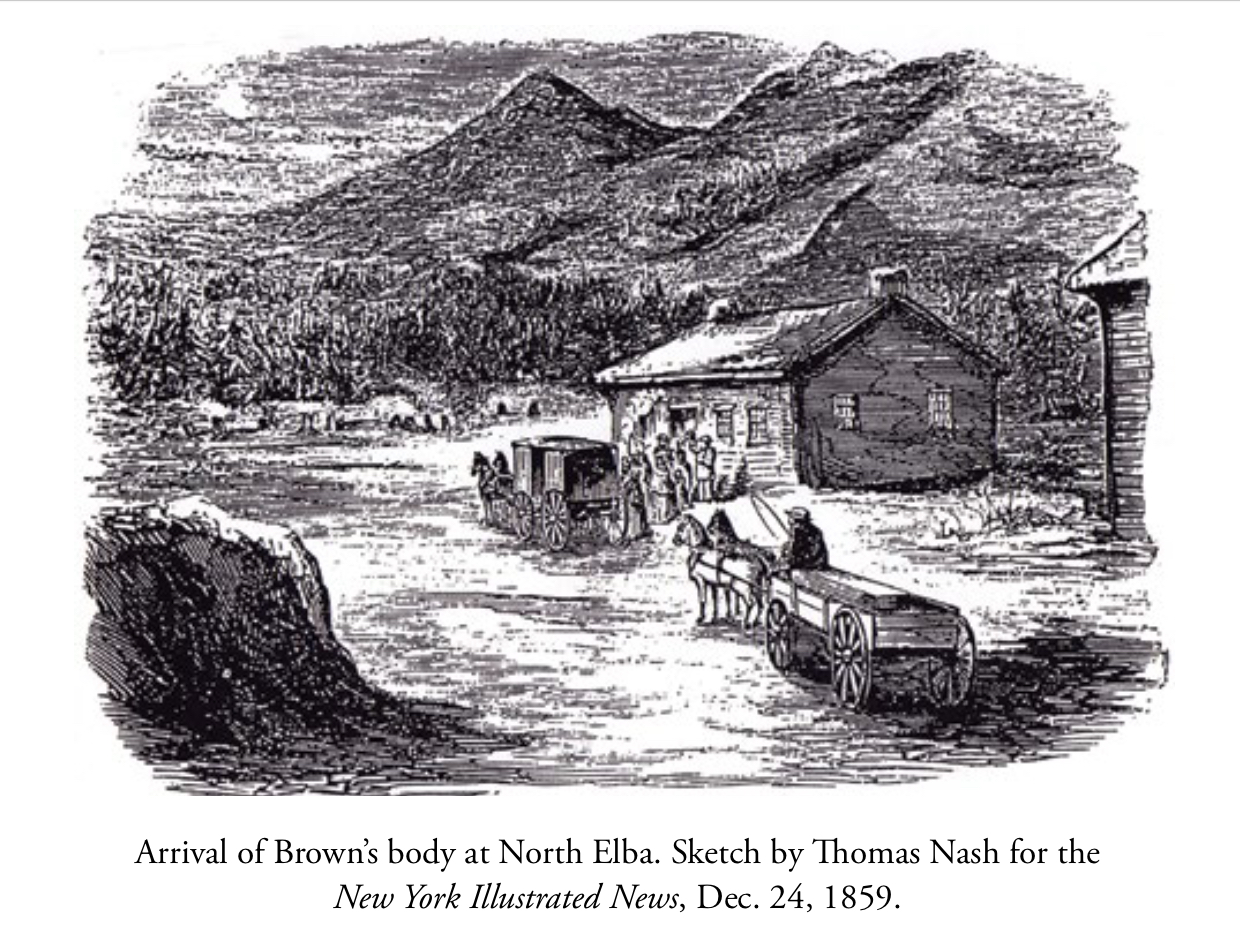
John Brown's coffin and accompanying party arrive at his house in North Elba, NY, 1859.

On Tuesday morning, December 6, the party continued by train to Vergennes, from which a ferry crossed Lake Champlain. 75 citizens escorted the party to the border of the city, standing in two lines with uncovered heads as the coffin passed by. A "procession of carriages" escorted them to the lake shore, with church bells ringing, and they boarded the ferry, which altered its normal docking point on the New York side to leave them closer to their destination.

A wagon awaited them at Westport, New York, and took them to Elizabethtown over an abandoned plank road, described as "excessively rough and unpleasant". Tuesday night, December 6, was spent at Adam's Hotel in Elizabethtown, New York. Brown's body lay in state at the Essex County Courthouse, with an honor guard of six men, chief among them Orlando Kellogg, "who never tired of telling the story of that December night". Wendell Phillips gave an impromptu talk of almost two hours on Brown's failed raid, his trial, and his execution. There is a historical marker, and in the Courthouse, since 1923, a painting of John Brown on trial.

The next day, December 7, the casket and the party, in two wagons, made the "most arduous trip" to Brown's farm. It took a whole day to cover the 20 miles (32 km) from Elizabethtown, through Keene, to North Elba. Everyone had to get off the wagons and walk for part of the day, to lighten the load on the horses. The descent was even more dangerous than the ascent. From Keene to North Elba they went via what is today (2021) called Old Mountain Road, not via Indian Pass, as Young misremembered. The final part of the road, impassible to vehicles for many years, is since 1986 part of the Jackrabbit Ski Trail.

From 2002 to 2005 a yearly excursion retraced this most difficult part of the trip. In 2005 a guidebook to the route was published.

== Funeral ==
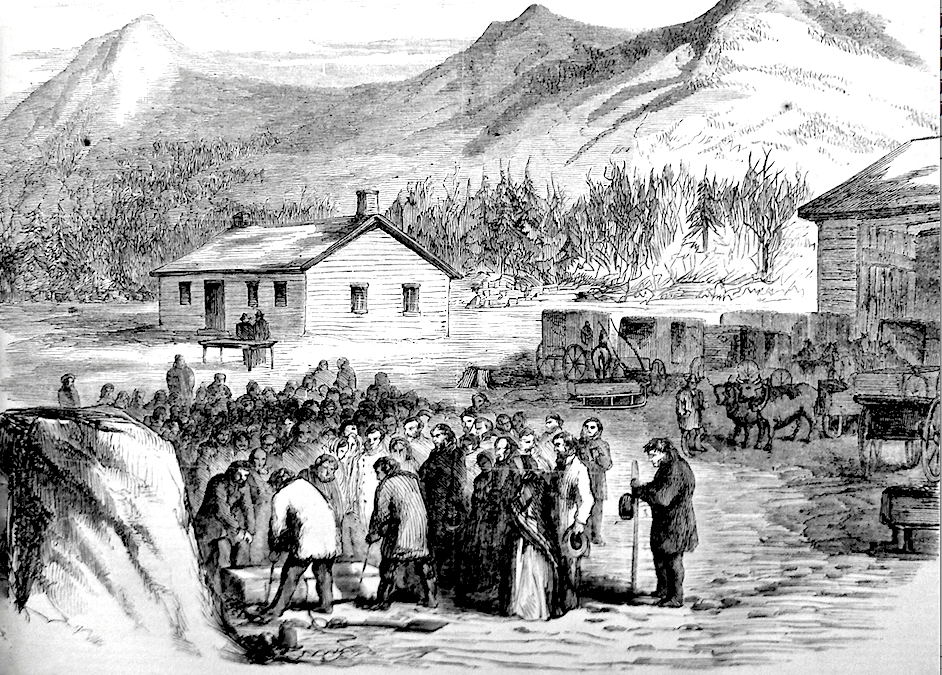
John Brown's burial, North Elba, NY, December 8, 1859. Note the boulder on the left.

Brown's funeral, with open casket, and burial took place on December 8, 1859, at the John Brown Farm State Historic Site, near modern Lake Placid, New York, where his "body lies a-mouldering", as the Battle Hymn of the Republic says. "Quite a number" of local residents attended. Oliver's widow was present, but not the widow of Watson. It would be many years before their bodies, along with those of Ruth Brown's husband William Thompson and his brother Augustus Dauphin Thompson, were recovered and buried next to their father.

The company sang Brown's favorite hymn, "Blow ye the trumpet—Blow". The hymn announced the liberation of slaves, for "The year of jubilee is come! Return, ye ransomed sinners, home." Eldest daughter Ruth accompanied on a melodeon, a wedding present from her father.

Rev. Joshua Young, from nearby Burlington, heard of the upcoming burial as the body passed through Rutland, and decided to attend, traveling all night—the moon was almost full—and arriving only hours before the ceremony. As he was the only clergyman present—others had declined—Phillips requested that he conduct the funeral service, and Young said he then "knew why God had sent [him] there". The reporter present, who took it down stenographically, called Young's impromptu opening prayer "impressive":

Our souls are filled with awe and are subdued to silence, as we think of that great, reverential, heroic soul, whose mortal remains we are now to commit to the earth, 'dust to dust,' while his spirit dwells with God who gave it, and his memory is enshrined in every pure and holy heart. ...May we consecrate ourselves anew to the work of Truth, Righteousness, and Love, forevermore to sympathize with the outcast and the oppressed, with the humble and the least of our suffering fellow-men.

...But, father in heaven, in imitation of the self-forgetfulness and self-sacrifice of the great departed, putting aside all personal anguish and all private grief, we supplicate thy special blessing upon God's despised ones—the poor enslaved, for whom our brother laid down his life. O! God cause the oppressed to go free, break any yoke and prostrate the pride and prejudice that dare to lift themselves up; and O! hasten the day when no more wrong or injustice shall be done on the earth; when all men shall love one another with pure hearts, fervently, and love God and do his will with all their soul and all their strength.

James McKim, who had accompanied Mrs. Brown in retrieving the body of her husband from Virginia, then offered remarks, and Wendell Phillips gave what Rev. Young called "one of his matchless speeches... Every hearer saw a great vision—one never to be forgotten". According to Phillips, "hereafter you will tell children standing at your knees, 'I saw John Brown buried, — I sat under his roof.'" Phillips "intimated that Massachusetts would yet possess the remains of John Brown."

Brown had requested that he be buried next to the large boulder near his farmhouse: "When I die, bury me by the big rock where I love to sit and read the word of God." As the body was lowered into the grave, Rev. Young recited the words of Paul just before his death, words John especially loved and which were inscribed in birch bark on the wall of a room in his house: "I have fought the good fight, I have finished my course, I have kept the faith. From now on there is reserved for me the crown of righteousness, which the Lord, the righteous judge, will give me on that day" (Second Epistle to Timothy). For this specifically, and in general for having presided over Brown's funeral, he found himself reviled upon his return home to Burlington. "I was called all manner of names. I was an anarchist, a traitor to my country, a blasphemer, and a 'vile associate of Garrison and Phillips.'" "The best thing I ever did was called the worst." He was eventually forced to resign his pulpit, and was told he would never get another ministerial position, which turned out not to be true.

Accompanying him back to Vermont, Wendell Phillips repeated his lecture, in a Town Hall full to overflowing, in Vergennes:

John Brown, said Mr. Phillips, represented the idea of the Northern people. He was emphatically one of those old Puritans of whom we love to dream. It is the death of men that make the greatest changes in the world. John Brown's death would effect a great change in American politics. A great man is one who becomes a centre for people to crystallize around. John Brown was such a man.

Mr. Phillips carried to Boston, from North Elba, a "large quantity of valuable matter", intended for Mr. Child's promised memoir of John Brown (which never appeared). This matter consisted of letters and other papers, and photographs of several members of the Brown and Thompson families. This material was then made available to the family's chosen biographer, James Redpath.

== Memorial on July 4, 1860 ==
His widow Mary soon complained to the press about "the multitude of letters addressed to her, for one purpose or another, by entire strangers, who have no claims upon her attention, and who seek to promote their own interest or gratify their curiosity, regardless of the restraints of delicacy and propriety."

On July 4, 1860, there was a memorial ceremony in honor of Brown at his farm. A Programme was issued announcing it; the family friends and biographers Richard J. Hinton and James Redpath signed them. This was the last time the living members of Brown's family would gather as a group. Those of his raiders still alive, except Tidd, also attended.

By 10 AM, 1,000 people were in attendance. The Declaration of Independence was read. Brown's favorite hymn, "Blow ye the trumpet, blow," was sung.

The "Orator of the Day", who stood atop the large boulder when speaking, was Luther Lee, a senior member of the U.S. abolitionist movement, born the same year as John Brown (1800). He spoke for two hours.

Thaddeus Hyatt attended, and spoke briefly. Letters apologizing for non-attendance were read from Thomas Wentworth Higginson, H. Ford Douglas, Rev. J. Sella Martin, James Redpath, F. B. Sanborn (who enclosed a hymn, which was also read), C. H. Brainard, and Frederick Douglass. Thoreau's "The Last Days of John Brown" was read in full. Brown's sons John Jr. and Owen, visiting from Ohio, also spoke. Others speaking were raiders Osborne Anderson, Barclay Coppoc, and Francis J. Meriam.

== The family moves to California ==
In 1860, the only son at the farm was Salmon, born in 1836, married in 1857. The oldest boys, John Jr. and Jason, who, like Salmon, chose not to go to Harpers Ferry after their experiences in Kansas, were already farming in Ohio. Owen, escaping from the Harpers Ferry raid, joined them and remained in Ohio until the Civil War was over. Frederick was killed in Kansas; Oliver and Watson were killed at Harpers Ferry. Annie and Sarah were enrolled in Franklin Sanborn's school in Concord, Massachusetts; tuition was paid by George L. Stearns, one of the Secret Six.

It was lonely for Mary, and more so after Salmon departed early in 1862 to join the Union Army; he was sworn in as 2nd Lieutenant of the 96th Regiment New York Volunteers, but he soon resigned, as those under him, presumably pro-slavery men, complained over his head about having a son of John Brown as their leader. In 1863 she leased and in 1865 sold the farm, 244 acres (99 ha), to Alexis Hinckley, a brother of Salmon's wife Abigail, for $800 (equivalent to $20,919 in 2025). The grave site was not sold, and it was written into the sale that everyone would be able to access John Brown's grave.

Accompanied by Salmon, his wife and two daughters, and Brown's daughters Sarah and Ellen, Mary set out in November 1863, driven by Lyman Epps to the new rail line at Keene, for John Jr.'s home at Put-in-Bay, Ohio. John Jr. joined Mary in complaining about the large number of curiosity seekers that visited him. "Our house has been like a well-patronized Hotel," he said.

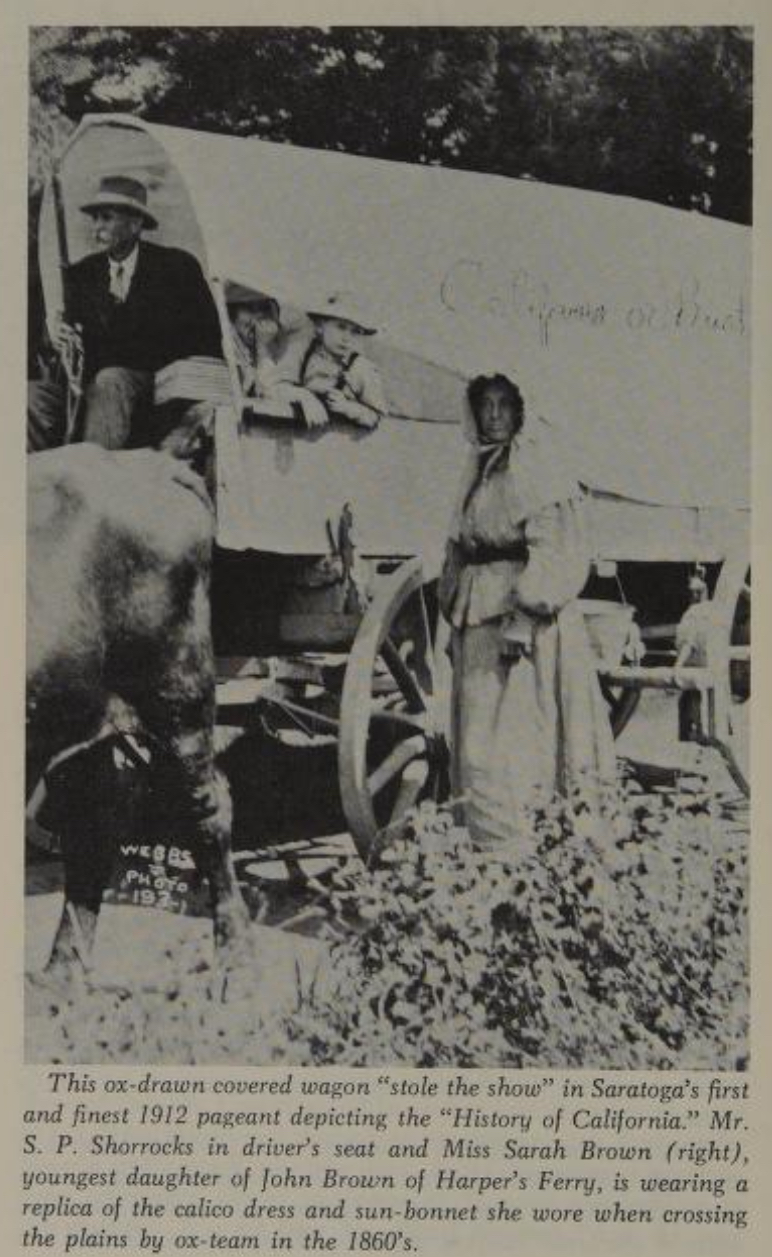
Sarah Brown, 1912, recreating the conditions of their trip to California. (Dress and covered wagon are replicas.)

Pushing on, Mary bought a farm in Decorah, Iowa, raising poultry and quail, and was joined there by Annie, who had just spent six months teaching former slaves in Norfolk, Virginia. After one winter, the hardest on record as of that date, colder than anything they'd experienced in North Elba, the family set off further west, in three covered wagons, via the Mormon Trail, crossing the Mississippi at Council Bluffs, Iowa, then Fort Kearny, Nebraska, and Soda Springs, Idaho. Southern sympathizers attempted to kill them on the trip, and four of Salmon's Merino sheep—travelling in a wagon—were poisoned. The family received a military escort for several hundred miles.

"You will ask how I liked crossing the Plains," wrote Annie to her sister in 1864. "It will do for one six mouths of one's life, but I should hate to waste another by doing it over again. We had a remarkably good time, and enjoyed it much; did not suffer deprivations or otherwise, as I supposed we should; still, I do not think I could advise any one to undertake the journey."

The end of the trip, where they settled in the fall of 1864, after 25 weeks of travel, was Red Bluff, California. They were near destitute: "a hungry, almost barefoot, ragged lot". Residents in Red Bluff helped them with their immediate needs. "We were given a sack of flour and other groceries, and I was given a pair of shoes and cloth for a dress," recalled Annie. "Mr. [Salmon] Brown got a job at once grubbing out young oaks for forty dollars. He did the job in eight days and we felt rich. How I loved California."

A statewide subscription, in which California Governor Frederick Low participated, raised $450 (equivalent to $9,465 in 2025), bought land, and built her a small house in Red Bluff, California. It is a California State Historic Landmark, Home of Mrs. John Brown, although unmarked. Mary lived there from 1866 to 1870, working as nurse and midwife. Salmon started ranching nearby, with only two sheep that survived the trip, one ram and one ewe; when one was sheared, the quality of the wool made the newspaper. He bought on credit new sheep and a ranch of 128 acres (52 ha) near Corning, California. Annie (born 1843) taught in a school for Black children some distance away, boarding with a Black family, until the school was destroyed by arson. Sarah (born 1846) also taught school to Black children, then moved to San Francisco and worked for the U.S. Mint. Ellen (born 1854) attended the local school. However, hostility towards the Browns developed.

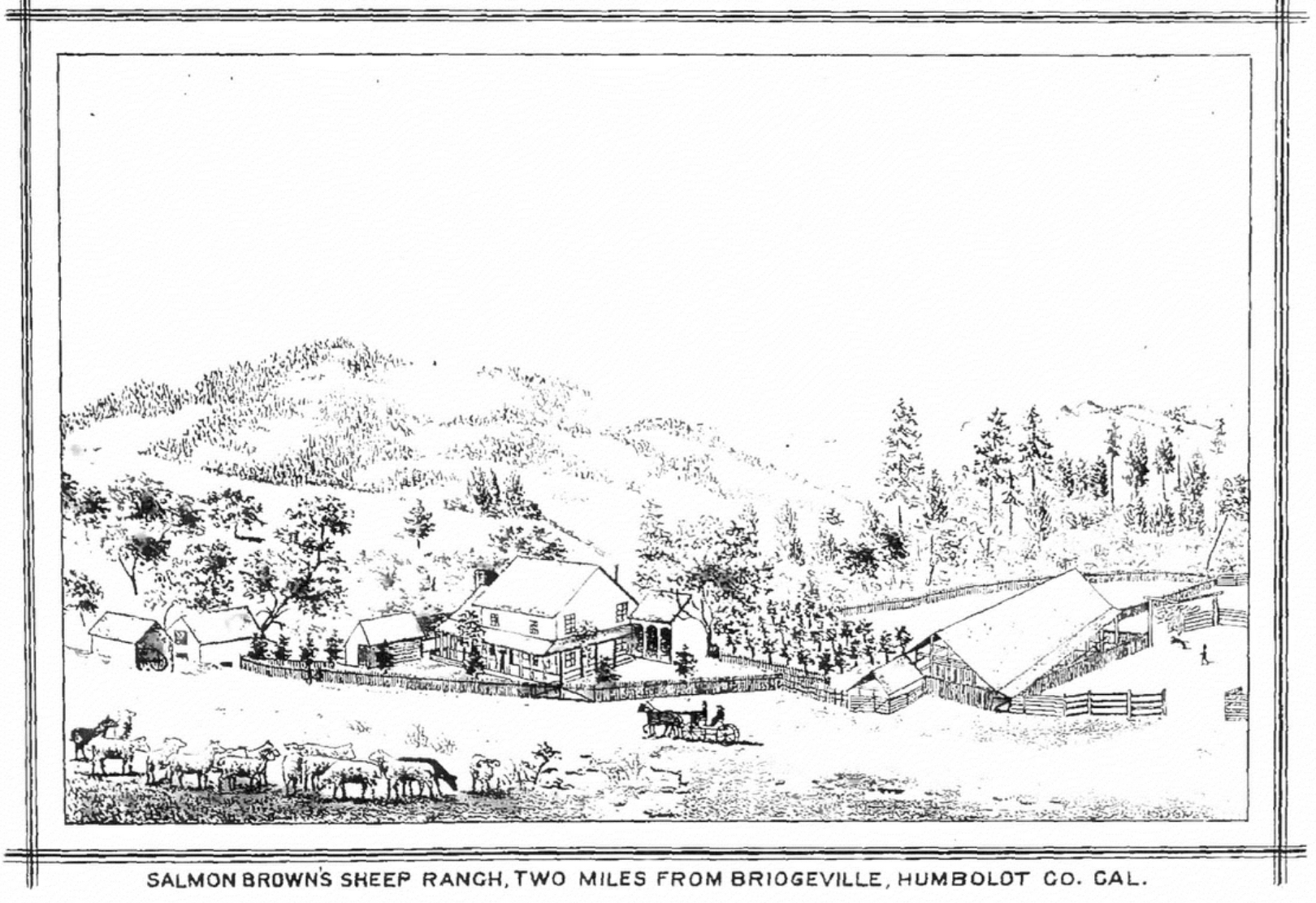
Salmon Brown's sheep ranch, two miles from Bridgeville, Humboldt County, California

After six years Mary, Sarah, and Salmon and his family moved to Humboldt County. (Salmon's daughter says he left Red Bluff after two years.) Salmon had lost many sheep in the winter and he sold his ranch and bought one of 320 acres (130 ha), where the weather was better for sheep, near Bridgeville. He was described in the press as prosperous. Mary and Sarah lived in nearby Rohnerville. In 1881 they moved to Saratoga, California, in Santa Clara County, and were joined by Ellen, her husband James Fablinger, a teacher, and their four small girls. Salmon did not accompany them, and in 1889 leased 2,000 acres (810 ha) and 2,000 sheep. He added to the ranch, making it 3,000 acres (1,200 ha), and he and his partner had fourteen thousand sheep. However, the loss of 8,000 of them during the winter of 1890–1891 led him to abandon sheep raising. In 1893 he and his family moved to Salem, Oregon. Alone among the Brown children, he publicly defended his father at length. In 1902 he moved to Portland, Oregon, where he ended in economic distress, and committed suicide because of the condition of his health and the burden he felt he was to his aged wife. He is buried in the Grand Army of the Republic Cemetery. Mary, Sarah, and Ellen are buried in Madronia Cemetery in Saratoga, California.

Their farm near Saratoga, which the family only farmed two years, was in 1928 open as the "Historic John Brown Lodge" hotel, even though John never set foot in California and the Lodge was built after Mary's death. It later became Camp Stuart of the Boy Scouts of America; the Boy Scouts having closed the camp, in 1996 it was controlled by the Santa Clara County Parks and Recreation Department.
