= John Brown's Body (disambiguation) =

"John Brown's Body" is an American marching song popular in the Union during the American Civil War.

John Brown's Body may also refer to:

- John Brown's Body (band), American reggae band
- John Brown's Body (novel), a 1969 novel by A. L. Barker
- "John Brown's Body" (poem), a 1928 poem by Stephen Vincent Benét
- "John Brown's Body", a song by Gregory Alan Isakov

== See also ==
- John Brown's body, about his burial
- Battle Hymn of the Republic
