= Squaw Hill =

Squaw Hill may refer to:

- Loybas Hill, California, a community formerly known as "Squaw Hill"
- Múmawet, a peak in California's Indio Hills formerly known as "Squaw Hill"
