= First Seat of Tehama County =

Historical place in Tehama County, United States

First Seat of Tehama County First Tehama County Courthouse
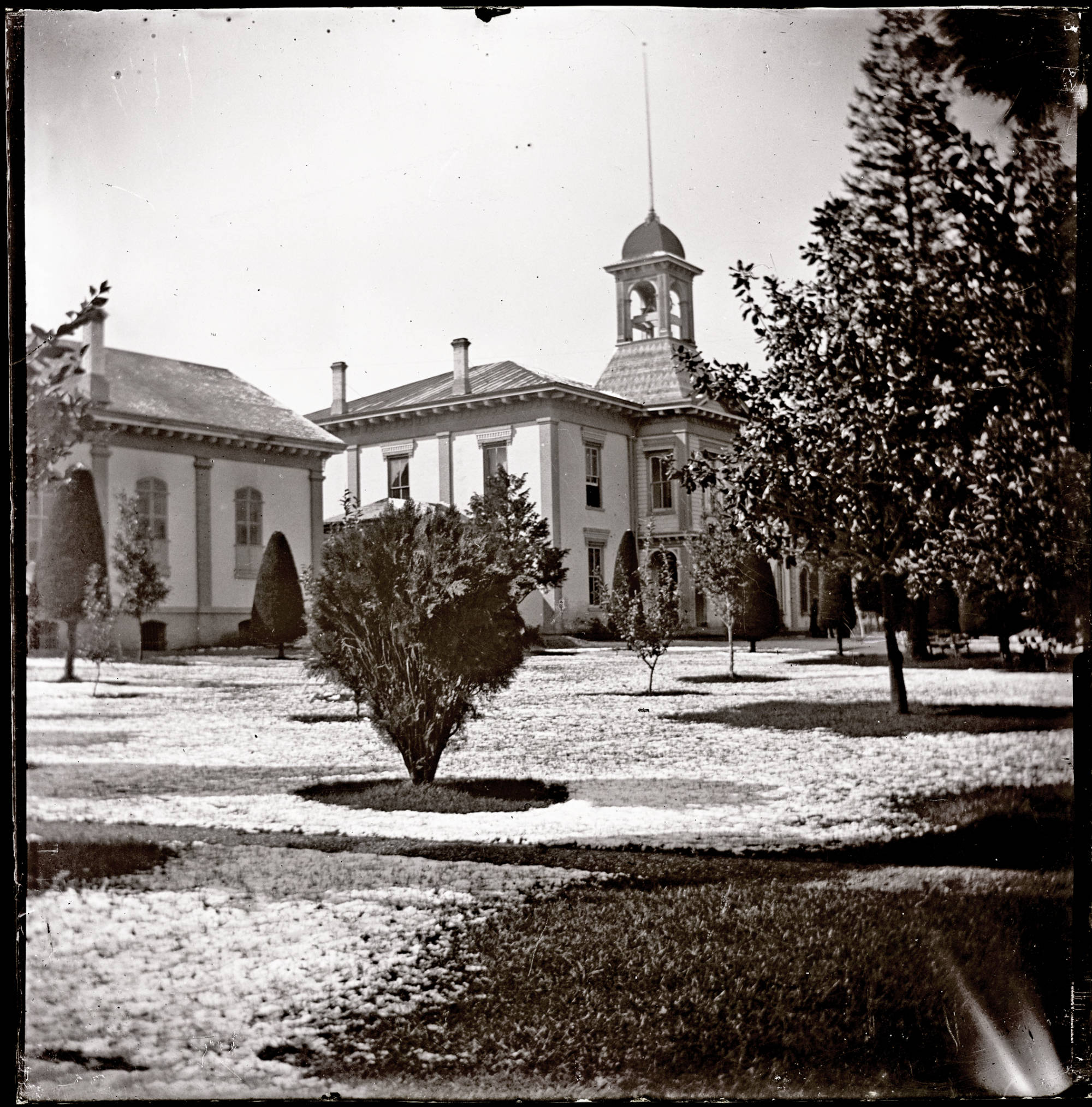
- Courthouse photographed by Charles Hughes c. 1890

- Location within California Location within the United States
- 40.026333°N 122.121667°W
- Location: 225 2nd Street, Tehama, California

History
- Built: 1856, 170 years ago

Site notes
- Governing body: Tehama County, California

California Historical Landmark
- Designated: June 20, 1935
- Reference no.: 183

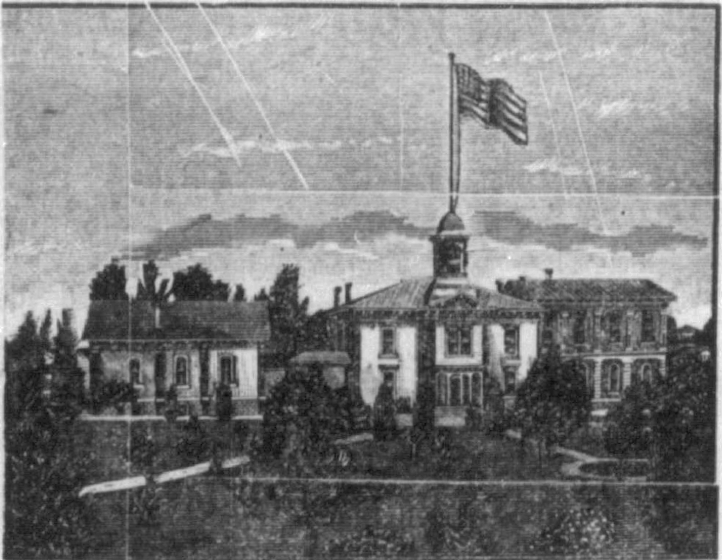
Tehama County Courthouse in 1860

First Seat of Tehama County, First Tehama County Courthouse, is historical site in Tehama, California in Tehama County, California. The First Seat of Tehama County is a California Historical Landmark No. 183 listed on June 20, 1935. First Tehama County Courthouse was held in the a rented room inside the Union Hotel, later called the Heider House. Also meeting in the Union Hotel was the Tehama County's Board of Supervisors and other county officials. The Tehama County seat was in the Union Hotel from May 1856 to March 1857. In March 1857 the Tehama County seat moved to Red Bluff. The Heider House-Union Hotel was lost in a fire in 1908. The Heider House-Union Hotel was built on land what was part of the Robert Hasty Thomes (1817-1878) 22,212-acre Mexican land grant, Rancho Saucos.

Tehama County was founded in 1856, with Tehama was the county seat. In 1860 the first courthouse, Tehama County Superior Court was built, a two-story building designed by B. C. Nusbaum and built by Virgil Baker.

A California historical marker is at 225 2nd Street, Tehama. The historical marker at First Seat of Tehama County site was placed there by the California Department of Parks and Recreation working with the Pair-O-Dice Chapter #7-11 and Trinitarianus Chapter No.62 E Clampus Vitus in 1981.

== See also ==
- California Historical Landmarks in Tehama County
