= Loybas Hill, California =

Unincorporated community in California, United States

- Unincorporated community
- Location within California Location within the United States
- Coordinates: 39°54′29″N 122°05′35″W
- Country: United States
- State: California
- County: Tehama County
- Elevation: 200 ft (60 m)

Loybas Hill (formerly Squaw Hill) is an unincorporated community in Tehama County, in the U.S. state of California. According to the Geographic Names Information System, the community is on the west side of the Sacramento River and 4.6 miles southeast of the city of Corning.

== History ==
=== Origins of name ===
According to local historian Marguerite Dietz, in the 19th century, riverboat captains called the area Squaw Hill because there were elderly Native American women ("squaws") who lived on the west bank of the Sacramento River and waved to them.

The name Loybas Hill was proposed by the Paskenta Band of Nomlaki Indians, to honor past, present and future Native women from and living in the area. Loybas translates to "young lady." The name was changed in 2023 after review by the Board on Geographic Names, part of the Department of the Interior, as part of a process to remove derogatory names from federal use.

=== Ferry and landings ===
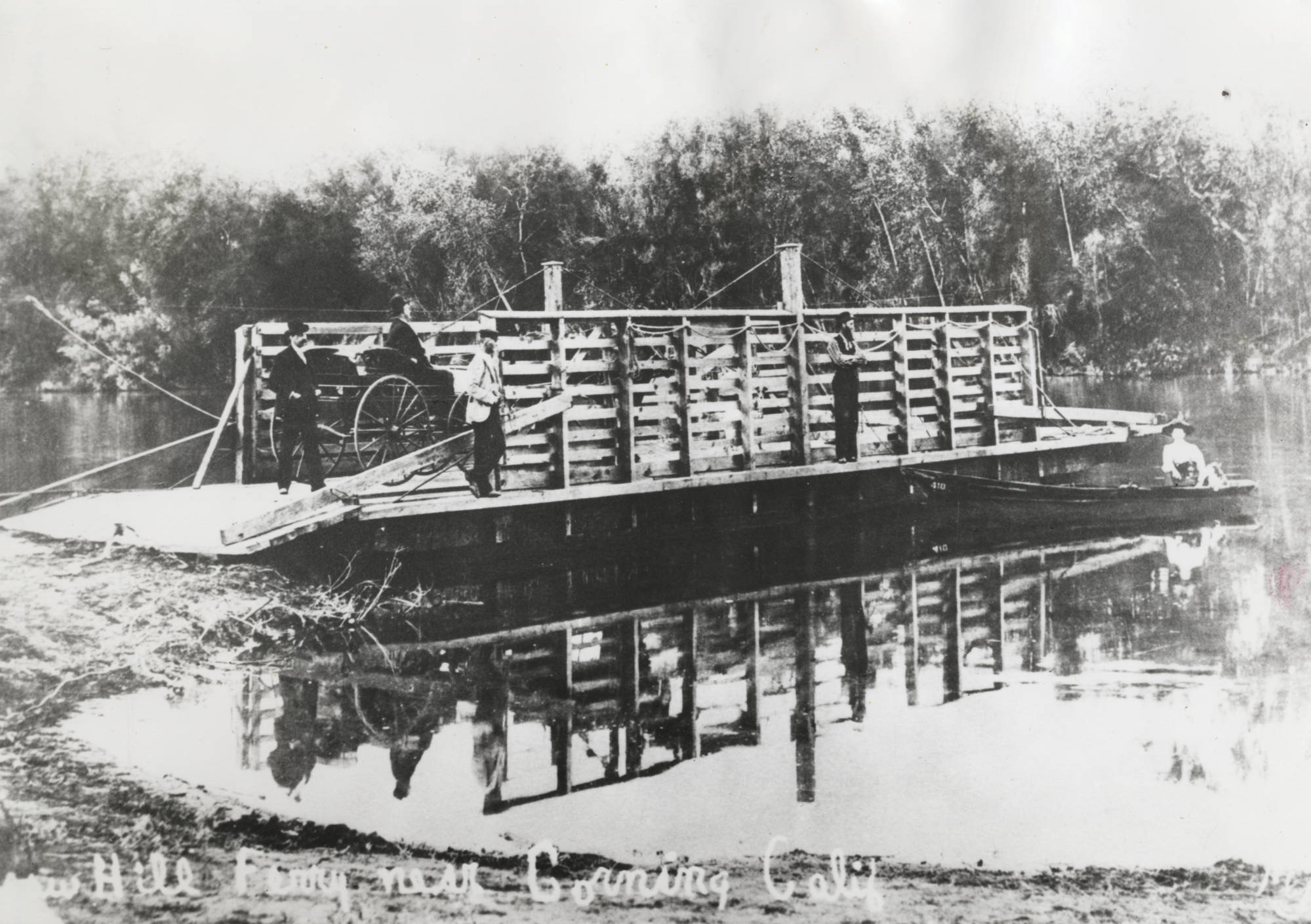
Squaw Hill Ferry on the Sacramento River (c. 1890)

One of the early settlers in the area was William C. Moon, a hunter from Tennessee who moved to California with the Workman-Rowland party in 1841. A former "bear flagger", he squatted west of Rancho Bosquejo, and built what was likely the first timber house in Tehama County two miles south of Squaw Hill between 1847 and 1849. During the California Gold Rush, Moon operated a ferry across the Sacramento River, where a bridge was later built on the road between Vina and Corning. The Moon House itself was a tavern serving prospectors and miners on their way to look for gold.

In the 1880s, farmers stored wheat in a warehouse at Squaw Hill, to be loaded onto steamboats. Many landings along the river were made of brush and tree prunings, upon which the boats would lay boards to load cargo. Snags were a severe problem in the twelve-mile stretch between Squaw Hill and Tehama, and removing logs and other wood debris was costly for many steam companies.

=== Bridge ===
The first Woodson Bridge at the Squaw Hill crossing opened on February 16, 1922, bringing an end to the local ferry service. It was named after Warren N. Woodson, a businessman from Corning. At the time, it was the first river crossing south of Tehama. The bridge was rebuilt in 1974, and dedicated in 1975.

In 1932, The Sacramento Union reported that farmers of Tehama County had fenced off a park area next to the bridge for barbecues and picnics, and installed an old-fashioned water pump. In the summer of 1934, Mrs. Leroy Martin of Squaw Hill circulated a petition to keep the area open as a park. Over the next 40 years, residents of Squaw Hill, Vina, and Corning raised funds and volunteered to create Tehama County River Park on the eastern bank of the Sacramento River.

=== School ===
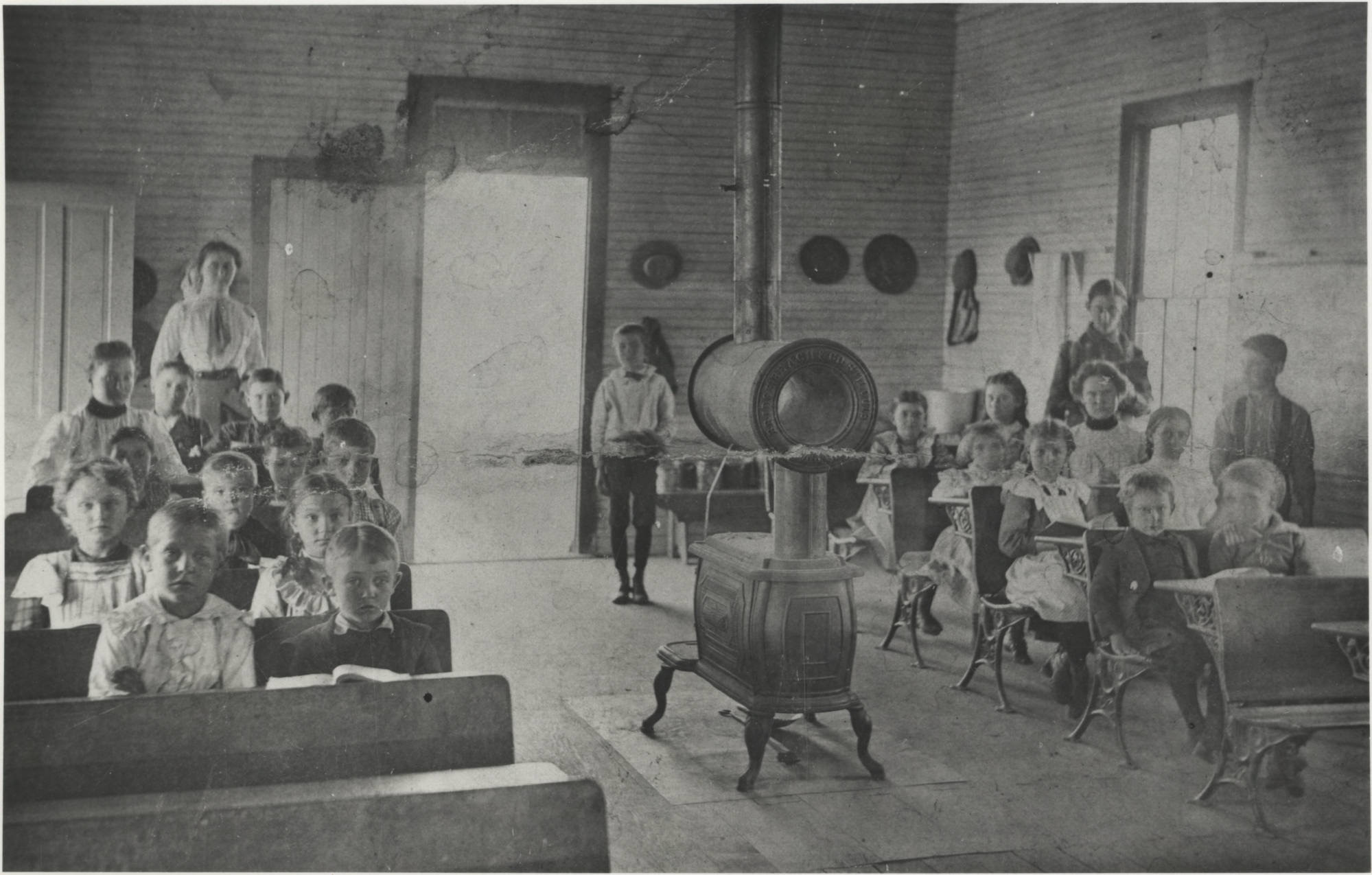
Inside the first Moon School

In the late 1800s, residents of Squaw Hill built a schoolhouse on land donated by William McLane, at the corner of Hall Road and Loleta Avenue. Known as the Moon School, it moved into a new two-room building in September 1906.

By June 1953, the school's enrollment had dropped to 15 students, with only one teacher for eight grades. The Moon school district was consolidated with Corning Union Elementary District during the following school year.

=== Population ===
Based on 1990 census data, a United States Department of Agriculture report found that the population of Squaw Hill "block group" was 2,028.

== Agriculture ==
In the 1920s, the area had orchards of olive trees, peach trees, and prune trees. Crops grown included alfalfa and corn. Livestock included milking cows and sheep. In 1932, ranchers in the area grew sorghum.

In 1969, the Red Bluff Daily News reported that Pioneer Nursery had 5.5 acres of pistachio seedlings in the Squaw Hill area, when pistachios were considered an up-and-coming nut in California.

== Telephone company ==
In 1909, ranchers in the area formed the independent Squaw Hill Telephone Company to ensure that they could reach the fire department in Corning in the event of emergencies, and speak to their neighbors without having to drive. There were 17 couples who originally formed the company, including Emil Staheli, treasurer, and his wife Helen. For the first 44 years, there were 16 members on a single line. One of the members was the Squaw Hill Ferry.

The first line was made by placing 2 by 4s on fence posts, and hooking one end to the company line into Corning. In 1953, company members voted to rebuild the line, creating two lines with eight parties on each. The new lines used heavy wire and glass insulators, as well as cedar poles, and hooked into the main telephone cable at the corner of the Moon schoolhouse. Pole climbing and troubleshooting were performed by the local owners themselves.

In 1969, company members reached an agreement with Pacific Telephone Company to take over their local phone service. At the time, the Squaw Hill Telephone Company was one of the few remaining companies of its kind. Over a 60-year period, 64 families had been members of the company.

== See also ==
- Nomi Lackee Indian Reservation
