= California Historical Landmarks in Tehama County =

This list includes properties and districts listed on the California Historical Landmark listing in Tehama County, California. Click the "Map of all coordinates" link to the right to view a Google map of all properties and districts with latitude and longitude coordinates in the table below.

Image		Landmark name	Location	City or town	Summary
First Tehama County Courthouse	183	First Tehama County Courthouse	2nd and D Sts. 40°01′35″N 122°07′17″W	Tehama	First courthouse in Red Bluff.
Home of Mrs. John Brown	117	Home of Mrs. John Brown	135 Main St. 40°10′21″N 122°13′50″W	Red Bluff	Home of abolitionist John Brown's wife.
Nomi Lackee Indian Reservation	357	Nomi Lackee Indian Reservation	Osborn Rd. 39°57′22″N 122°29′12″W	Flournoy	Was a 23,000 acres reservation with a fort.
William B. Ide Adobe	12	William B. Ide Adobe	William B. Ide Adobe State Historic Park; 40°11′50″N 122°13′34″W	Red Bluff	

== See also ==
- List of California Historical Landmarks
- National Register of Historic Places listings in Tehama County, California
