= Hydesville, California =

Hydesville
- census-designated place
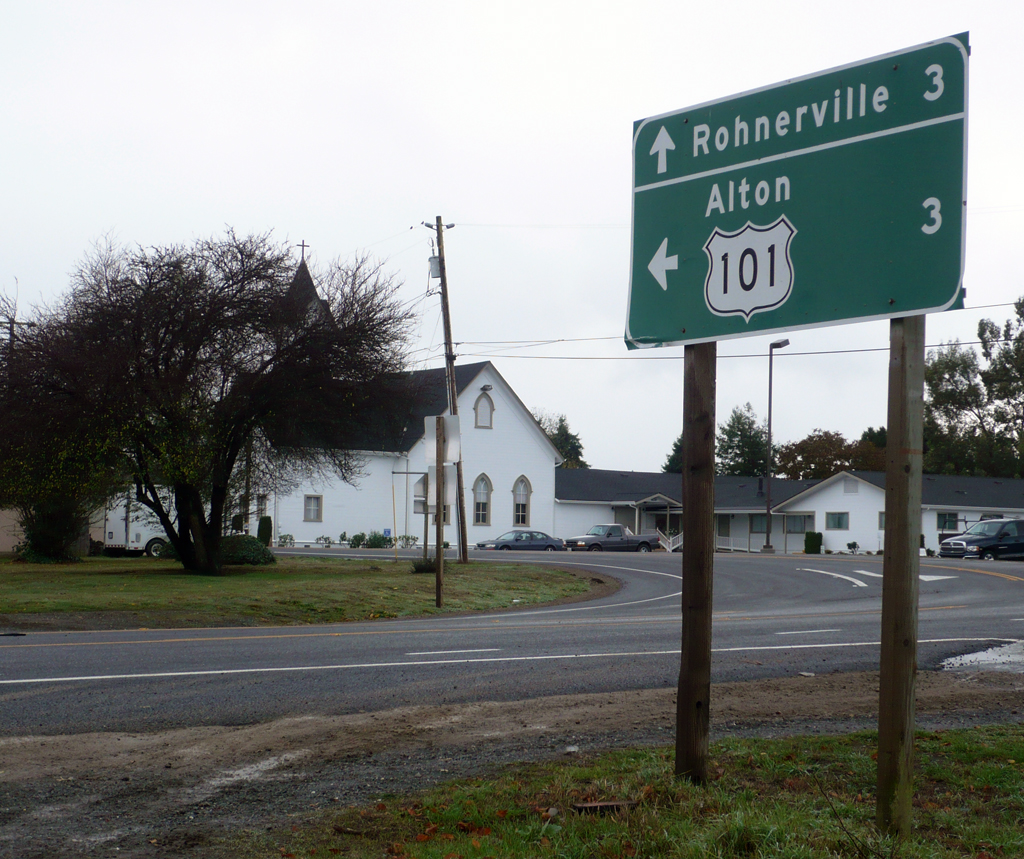

- Location in Humboldt County and the state of California
- Coordinates: 40°32′51″N 124°05′50″W
- Country: United States
- State: California
- County: Humboldt

Area
  - Total: 7.500 sq mi (19.424 km^{2})
  - Land: 7.500 sq mi (19.424 km^{2})
  - Water: 0 sq mi (0 km^{2}) 0%
- Elevation: 364 ft (111 m)

Population (2020)
  - Total: 1,244
  - Density: 165.9/sq mi (64.04/km^{2})
- Time zone: UTC-8 (Pacific (PST))
  - Summer (DST): UTC-7 (PDT)
- ZIP code: 95547
- Area code: 707
- FIPS code: 06-36126
- GNIS feature ID: 1658804

Hydesville is a census-designated place (CDP) in Humboldt County, California, United States. Hydesville is located 4.5 miles (7.2 km) southeast of Fortuna and 2.25 miles (3.6 km) southeast of Rohnerville, at an elevation of 364 feet (111 m). The population was 1,244 at the 2020 census, up from 1,237 at the 2010 census.

== Geography ==
According to the United States Census Bureau, the CDP has a total area of 7.5 square miles (19 km^{2}), all land.

== Demographics ==
Historical population
Census	Pop.	Note	%±
1990	1,131		—
2000	1,209		6.9%
2010	1,237		2.3%
2020	1,244		0.6%
U.S. Decennial Census; 1860–1870 1880-1890; 1900 1910 1920; 1930 1940 1950; 1960 1970 1980; 1990 2000 2010; 2020

Hydesville first appeared as a census designated place in the 1990 U.S. census.

=== Racial and ethnic composition ===
Hydesville CDP, California – Racial and ethnic composition Note: the US Census treats Hispanic/Latino as an ethnic category. This table excludes Latinos from the racial categories and assigns them to a separate category. Hispanics/Latinos may be of any race.
Race / Ethnicity (NH = Non-Hispanic)	Pop 2000	Pop 2010	Pop 2020	% 2000	% 2010	% 2020
White alone (NH)	1,069	1,082	1,031	88.42%	87.47%	82.88%
Black or African American alone (NH)	0	1	7	0.00%	0.08%	0.56%
Native American or Alaska Native alone (NH)	42	31	15	3.47%	2.51%	1.21%
Asian alone (NH)	2	6	4	0.17%	0.49%	0.32%
Native Hawaiian or Pacific Islander alone (NH)	0	0	0	0.00%	0.00%	0.00%
Other race alone (NH)	7	4	5	0.58%	0.32%	0.40%
Mixed race or Multiracial (NH)	31	42	86	2.56%	3.40%	6.91%
Hispanic or Latino (any race)	58	71	96	4.80%	5.74%	7.72%
Total	1,209	1,237	1,244	100.00%	100.00%	100.00%

=== 2020 census ===
As of the 2020 census, Hydesville had a population of 1,244 and a population density of 165.9 inhabitants per square mile (64.1/km^{2}). The census reported that 1,226 people (98.6% of the population) lived in households, 18 (1.4%) lived in non-institutionalized group quarters, and no one was institutionalized. 0.0% of residents lived in urban areas, while 100.0% lived in rural areas.

The racial makeup was 1,051 (84.5%) White, 7 (0.6%) African American, 19 (1.5%) Native American, 4 (0.3%) Asian, 0 (0.0%) Pacific Islander, 38 (3.1%) from other races, and 125 (10.0%) from two or more races. Hispanic or Latino of any race were 96 persons (7.7%).

There were 492 households, out of which 135 (27.4%) had children under the age of 18 living in them, 272 (55.3%) were married-couple households, 42 (8.5%) were cohabiting couple households, 98 (19.9%) had a female householder with no partner present, and 80 (16.3%) had a male householder with no partner present. 125 households (25.4%) were one person, and 62 (12.6%) were one person aged 65 or older. The average household size was 2.49, and there were 340 families (69.1% of all households).

The age distribution was 300 people (24.1%) under the age of 18, 62 people (5.0%) aged 18 to 24, 276 people (22.2%) aged 25 to 44, 310 people (24.9%) aged 45 to 64, and 296 people (23.8%) who were 65 years of age or older. The median age was 44.1 years. For every 100 females, there were 101.3 males, and for every 100 females age 18 and over, there were 96.7 males.

There were 519 housing units at an average density of 69.2 units per square mile (26.7 units/km^{2}), of which 492 (94.8%) were occupied. Of occupied units, 378 (76.8%) were owner-occupied and 114 (23.2%) were occupied by renters. Of all housing units, 5.2% were vacant. The homeowner vacancy rate was 0.8%, and the rental vacancy rate was 9.4%.

=== Income and poverty ===
In 2023, the US Census Bureau estimated that the median household income was $85,179, and the per capita income was $53,007. About 12.7% of families and 17.4% of the population were below the poverty line.

=== 2010 census ===
The 2010 United States census reported that Hydesville had a population of 1,237. The population density was 164.9 inhabitants per square mile (63.7/km^{2}). The racial makeup of Hydesville was 1,108 (89.6%) White, 4 (0.3%) African American, 33 (2.7%) Native American, 6 (0.5%) Asian, 0 (0.0%) Pacific Islander, 30 (2.4%) from other races, and 56 (4.5%) from two or more races. Hispanic or Latino of any race were 71 persons (5.7%).

The Census reported that 1,235 people (99.8% of the population) lived in households, 1 (0.1%) lived in non-institutionalized group quarters, and 1 (0.1%) were institutionalized.

There were 485 households, out of which 136 (28.0%) had children under the age of 18 living in them, 282 (58.1%) were opposite-sex married couples living together, 41 (8.5%) had a female householder with no husband present, 34 (7.0%) had a male householder with no wife present. There were 32 (6.6%) unmarried opposite-sex partnerships, and 9 (1.9%) same-sex married couples or partnerships. 102 households (21.0%) were made up of individuals, and 40 (8.2%) had someone living alone who was 65 years of age or older. The average household size was 2.55. There were 357 families (73.6% of all households); the average family size was 2.91.

The population age distribution is 262 people (21.2%) under the age of 18, 88 people (7.1%) aged 18 to 24, 250 people (20.2%) aged 25 to 44, 449 people (36.3%) aged 45 to 64, and 188 people (15.2%) who were 65 years of age or older. The median age was 46.2 years. For every 100 females, there were 102.8 males. For every 100 females age 18 and over, there were 102.7 males.

There were 514 housing units at an average density of 68.5 per square mile (26.4/km^{2}), of which 485 were occupied, of which 364 (75.1%) were owner-occupied, and 121 (24.9%) were occupied by renters. The homeowner vacancy rate was 1.9%; the rental vacancy rate was 3.2%. 948 people (76.6% of the population) lived in owner-occupied housing units and 287 people (23.2%) lived in rental housing units.

== History ==
The town was named for John Hyde, donor of the land on which the town sits.

One of the three nearly simultaneous assaults on members of the Wiyot people during the 1860 Wiyot massacre, when white settlers murdered 80 to 250 Wiyot, mostly women and children, took place in Hydesville on February 26, 1860.

Hydesville post office opened in 1861.

In 1879, there was a professional minor league baseball team in Hydesville, in the short-lived Humboldt County League. During 1910–1918, the town was temporarily called Goose Prairie before changing back to Hydesville.

== Government ==
In the state legislature, Hydesville is in the 2nd senatorial district, represented by Democrat Mike McGuire, and the 2nd Assembly district, represented by Democrat Chris Rogers.

Federally, Hydesville is in California's 2nd congressional district, represented by Democrat Jared Huffman.

The post office serves zip code 95547. The elementary school competes as the Hydesville Wildcats.
