= Rohnerville, California =

Unincorporated community in California, United States

Rohnerville
- Unincorporated community
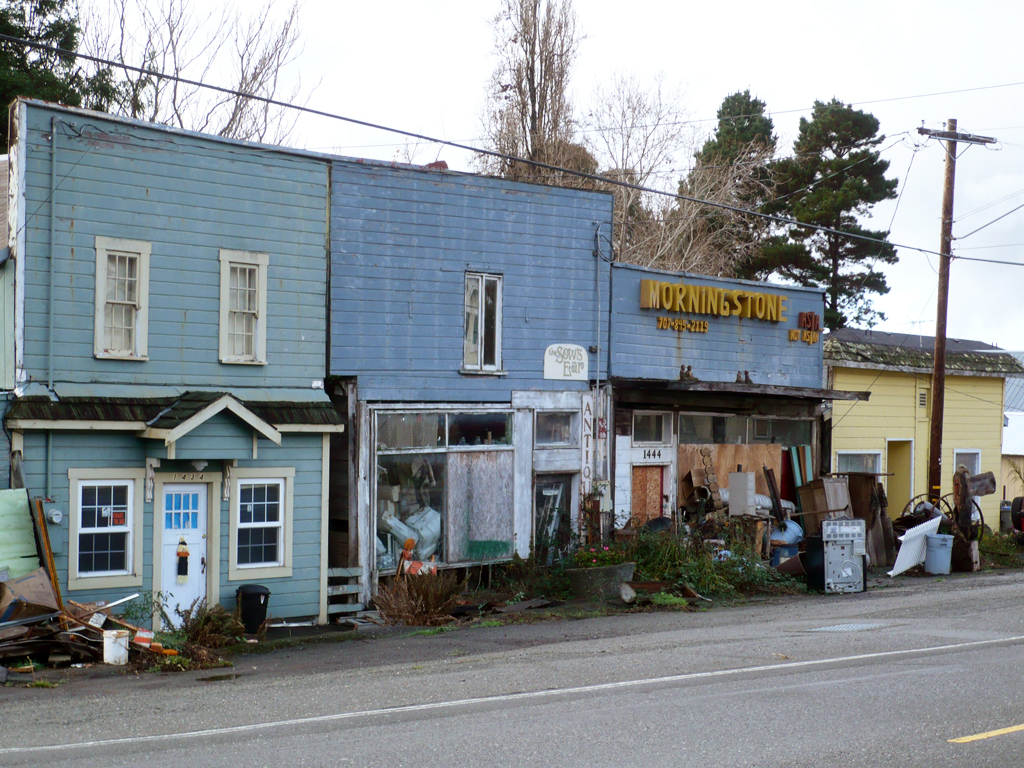
- Old Town Rohnerville

- Location in California Rohnerville (the United States)
- Coordinates: 40°34′01″N 124°08′08″W
- Country: United States
- State: California
- County: Humboldt
- Elevation: 200 ft (60 m)

Rohnerville (formerly Eel River) is an unincorporated community in Humboldt County, California, United States. It is located 2.25 miles (3.6 km) southeast of Fortuna and 2.25 miles (3.6 km) northwest of Hydesville, at an elevation of 197 feet (60 m).

The Eel River post office opened in 1857 and changed its name to Rohnerville in 1874 in honor of the town's founder, Henry Rohner.

Early residents included Mary Brown, widow of John Brown the abolitionist, and her daughters, who moved to Rohnerville from Red Bluff in Tehama County and lived in Rohnerville from 1870 until 1881, when she moved to Saratoga, California. (See John Brown's body#The family moves to California.)

The town is now part of Fortuna.

== Climate ==
This region experiences warm (but not hot) and dry summers, with no average monthly temperatures above 71.6 °F (22.0 °C). According to the Köppen climate classification system, Rohnerville has a warm-summer Mediterranean climate, abbreviated Csb on climate maps.

== See also ==
- Northwestern Pacific Railroad
- Rohnerville Airport
