= Nomi Lackee Indian Reservation =

Historical place in Tehama County, United States

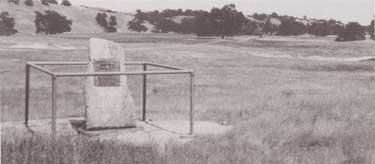
- Nomi Lackee Indian Reservation marker

- Location within California Location within the United States
- 39.956213°N 122.486563°W
- Location: Osborn Road, Flournoy, California.

History
- Built: 1854, 172 years ago

California Historical Landmark
- Designated: October 9, 1939
- Reference no.: 357

Nomi Lackee Indian Reservation is historical site built in 1854 in Flournoy, California in Tehama County, California. The site of the Nomi Lackee Indian Reservation is California Historical Landmark No. 357, listed on October 9, 1939. Nomi Lackee Indian Reservation was a Native American reservation from 1854 to 1866. The reservation was also used as a United States Army military fort with a population of 300 to 2,500. The Nomi Lackee Indian Reservation was 25,139 acres, in what is now Tehama County on Osborn Road. In 1866 the population moved to the Round Valley Reservation in Mendocino County, California and Trinity County, California. Round Valley, Mendocino County, California is California Historical Landmark No. 674.

On the Nomi Lackee Indian Reservation was the US Army's Nome Lackee Post, a fort, with 10-foot-high wall for protection. Around the fort was an adobe brick wall was two and half feet-thick. In the fort was the administration building, mess hall, a granary, and a warehouse. Outside the fort was an adobe Indian Agent building (Nome Lackee Indian Agency), a blacksmith shop, doctor's office, gristmill, barn, and stable. To help feed the population the post also had 600 fruit trees, 1,000 acres crops (Nome Farm), live stock and cattle. The fort was closed as the Native population was peaceful and there was no need of fort at the site. A marker is at the former site of the fort.

== See also ==
- California Historical Landmarks in Tehama County
