= Home of Mrs. John Brown =

Historical place in Tehama County, United States

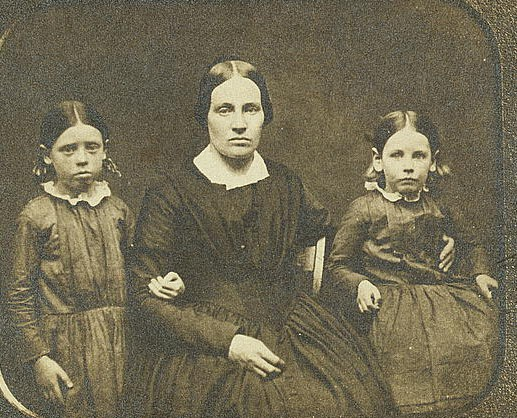
- Mrs. John Brown wife of John Brown

- Location within California Location within the United States
- 40.0263°N 122.121369°W
- Location: 135 Main Street, Red Bluff, California.

History
- Built: 1865, 161 years ago

Site notes
- Architect: Victorian house

California Historical Landmark
- Designated: March 29, 1933
- Reference no.: 117

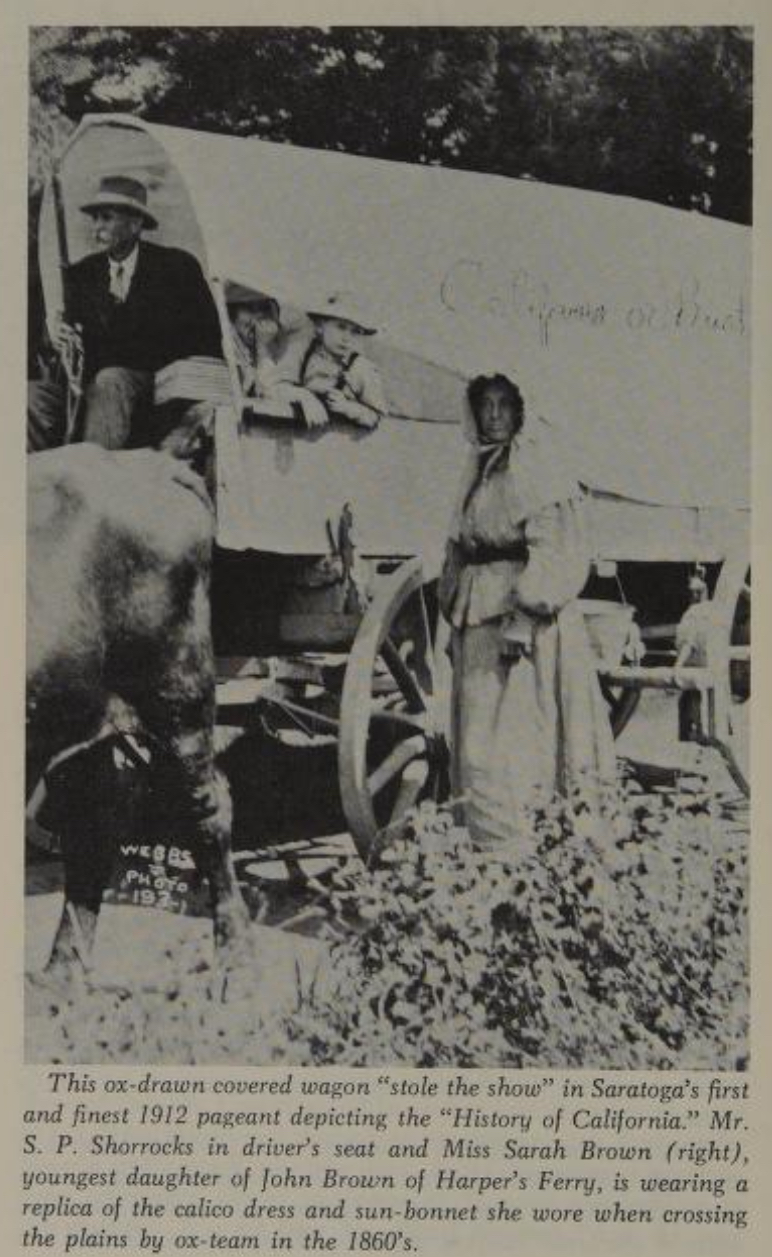
Sarah Brown in 1912, recreating the conditions of their trip to California. (Dress and covered wagon are replicas.)

The Home of Mrs. John Brown is a Victorian house built in 1865 at 135 Main St., Red Bluff, in Tehama County, California. The home that Mrs. John Brown (1816–1884) lived in is a California Historical Landmark No. 117 listed on March 29, 1933. At the time Mrs. John Brown was the widow of famous abolitionist John Brown (1800–1859).

John Brown was the leader of an anti-slavery raid on Harpers Ferry, Virginia in 1859. In Virginia v. John Brown he was found guilty and he was executed on December 2, 1859. Those that disliked slavery in America saw John Brown as hero and a martyr. Mrs. John Brown and her children Annie, Sarah, Ellen, and Salmon came to Red Bluff in the fall of 1864. Mary arrived poor and homeless; the community of Red Bluff helped her, and talked about getting her a house. The town had a meeting on April 17, 1865, to talk about what could be done. On June 5, 1865, a local request for donations was sent out in the newspaper. This news made Sacramento, where a public meeting was held on June 15, 1865. From this meeting the Governor of California at the time, Frederick Low, and the Reverend M. C. Briggs, a Methodist Pastor, became the head of the John Brown Cottage Fund. D. O. Mills founder of the D.O. Mills Bank was the treasurer of the fund. The state of California raised the funds for her house.

The John Brown Cottage Fund raised $450 (equivalent to $9,465 in 2025) for the lot and new house. With funds the lot was purchased and the small house built. Mary lived in the Red Bluff house from 1866 to 1870. In Red Bluff she worked as both a nurse and midwife.

Mrs. Brown lived in this house in Red Bluff until 1870 in a Oxen covered wagon. In 1870, Mrs. Brown and her children sold the house and moved to Rohnerville, California in Humboldt County. The home was later the house of Gus Schroder. The house was originally at southwest corner of Main and Willow Street and has been moved to its current spot a little south off the corner. There is no marker at the house.

== See also ==
- California Historical Landmarks in Tehama County
