= Watson Brown (abolitionist) =

American abolitionist, son of John Brown

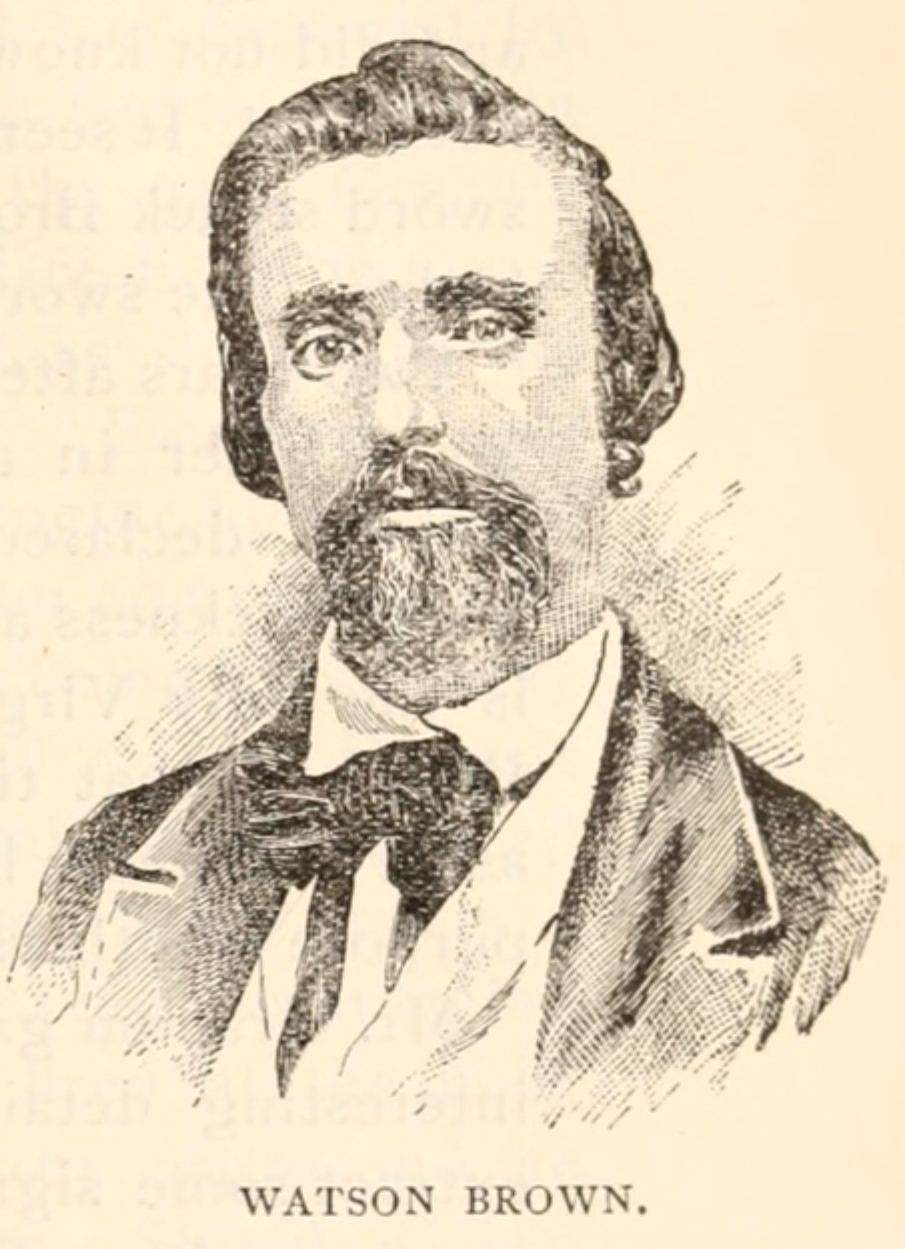
- Born: October 7, 1835; Franklin Mills, Ohio
- Died: October 19, 1859 (aged 24); Harpers Ferry, West Virginia
- Occupation: Farmer
- Known for: Killed during John Brown's raid on Harpers Ferry; mummified and made into museum exhibit by Confederates

Watson Brown (October 7, 1835 – October 19, 1859) was a son of the abolitionist John Brown and his second wife Mary Day Brown, born in Franklin Mills, Ohio (today Kent, Ohio). He was married to Isabell Thompson Brown, and they had a son Frederick W., who died of diphtheria at age 4, and is buried at what is now the John Brown Farm State Historic Site in North Elba, New York.

== His death at Harpers Ferry ==
Watson was the one Brown boy who did not go to Kansas in the 1850s, part of his father's efforts to prevent Kansas from becoming a slave state. In 1856 he wrote his mother from Iowa.

He participated in his father's famous raid on Harpers Ferry, Virginia (since 1863, West Virginia), sending letters to his wife Belle from the Kennedy farmhouse. He was killed during the fighting. The circumstances were that he emerged from the engine house at 10 a.m. on Monday the 17th, carrying a white flag, but was immediately shot, not by a soldier but by a townsperson. At 3 p.m. he was still able to fight. Lying on the ground and with no medical treatment, he lived on in great agony, his father preventing him from killing himself to end the pain, until about 3 a.m. on Wednesday the 19th, according to Edwin Coppock. According to his father, "our poor Watson lingered until Wednesday about noon of the 19th of October."

The following was written by Watson and found on the floor of the engine house:

Fight on, fight ever, you Hell Hown [sic] of the Lower Regions!. Your day has come. Lower your black flag, shoot your Dogs you Devils. Hell and furies! go in for Death.

== His body at Winchester Medical College ==
His body, one of the many victims lying in the road in Harpers Ferry, was taken by students and faculty of the Winchester Medical College, in Winchester, Virginia. However, instead of using it for dissection and anatomy study, which was the fate of the other three bodies they also helped themselves to, it was prepared as a medical specimen or exhibit. Using techniques that were innovative at the time, a doctor at the College, presumably its head and anatomy professor Hugh Holmes McGuire, stained the arteries, drained of blood, with red dye, treated the muscles so they resembled wood, and preserved the nerves with varnish. The skin, half of the skull, and the brain were removed. It became a teaching exhibit in the College's one-room museum. This took place almost immediately after his death (there was no refrigeration).

== An anti-abolitionist exhibit ==
From papers found in a pocket they found that he was a son of John Brown, but they never learned which one. Nevertheless, the body was used as a means of showing the pro-slavery, secessionist city and College's attitude toward abolitionists. The exhibit was labelled "John Brown's son—thus always with Abolitionists", an allusion to Virginia's motto, "Sic semper tyrannis", "Thus always to tyrants." The lips were "purposely distorted in disrespect."

The skin was used to make moccasins. Small pieces of the skin were held by doctors and others locally as souvenirs. Four of the finger joints on one hand and all the toes on one foot had also been taken by souvenir hunters. Teeth had been deliberately broken.

In retaliation for this insult to the great Union icon and to their cause, Union forces burned the College just before leaving Winchester. It never reopened.

== Rescue of the body by Jarvis Johnson ==
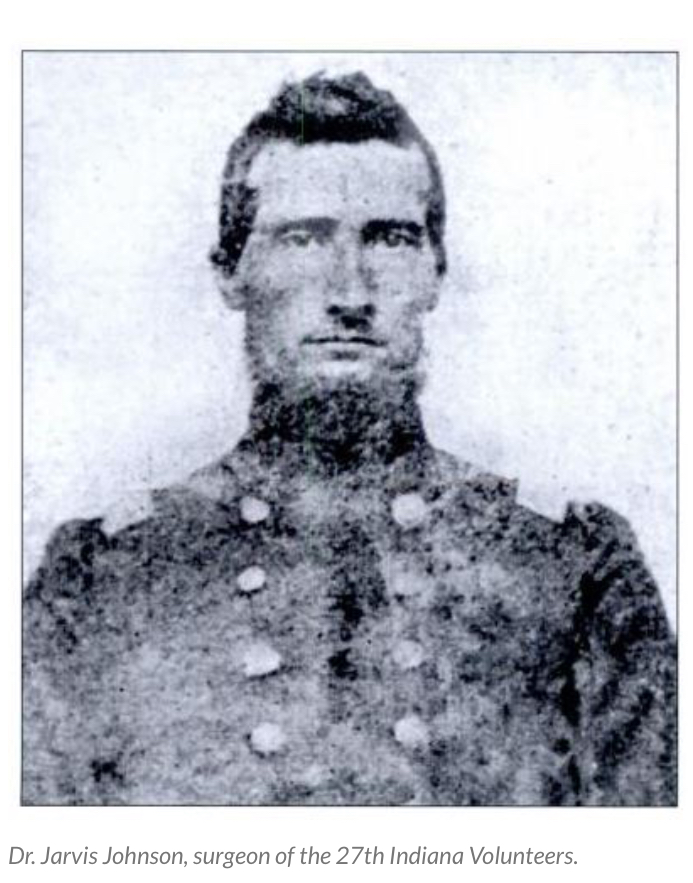
Jarvis J. Johnson

At the outbreak of the Civil War the College closed, as both students and professors were occupied in the war effort. (Hunter McGuire, Hugh's son and also a professor, was the personal physician of Stonewall Jackson.) The College was used as a hospital, although it was evacuated when Confederate troops withdrew in advance of the Union troops.

When Union troops under Gen. Nathaniel Banks entered Winchester in March 1862, Banks turned over management of the hospitals in the city to an Army doctor from Indiana, Jarvis J. Johnson. Johnson found the exhibited body, which he called "one of the most beautiful specimens he ever saw". "A number of prominent citizens of Winchester called upon me at the hospital, and each and all declared that it was the remains of a son of John Brown."

One of the professors of the said college [presumably Hugh McGuire] also called upon me in person, and demanded that I return the specimen. He then gave me all the details of the manner in which the body had been prepared, and said that he did it himself. He told me that after young Brown was killed at Harper's Ferry, that he had the body sent to Winchester, and that upon consultation with the other professors of the college, it was decided to prepare the body of young Brown that it might be preserved in the museum of the college as a specimen, and as an object of interest and note.

The professor strongly appealed to me in the name of my profession, and in the interest of the same, and as a friend of science to return to him the said body. ...He cited the fact that the sons of John Brown had been killed while engaged with their father in the attempt to overthrow Virginia's cherished institution of slavery, and hence Virginia was entitled to the body as an object of warning and curiosity.

In answer to the demand and appeals of the professor I said that the memory of John Brown and his sons, and their heroic battle at Harper's Ferry for the freedom of the slave, were held in too high esteem for me to leave the body upon the slave soil of Virginia. [Italics added.]

What to do with the body, how to rescue it from this dishonor, was a problem for Johnson. If it had been buried in Virginia, which Virginians did not want, it would have been dug up immediately by the doctor or his agent. In theory the body could have been sent to Watson's mother at her home in North Elba, New York, but he said he felt this would just add to her many sorrows. So he shipped it to his home in Indiana, and kept it there.

== Identification and burial of Watson's body ==
As reports on the Harpers Ferry raid began to appear, it was determined that this body had to be either Oliver or Watson Brown, John's two sons killed during the raid. But no one knew which.

Twenty-three years later, in 1882, Johnson read in a newspaper that John Brown's widow was visiting Chicago. Through an intermediary he wrote her, saying that he had the body of one of her sons and that he wanted to turn it over to her for burial. He emphasized that he was not selling the body and would not accept any reward or other compensation. This added to his credibility.

At Mrs. Brown's request, her stepson John Jr. traveled, with pictures, to the doctor's home in Martinsville, Indiana, and was the guest of the governor of Indiana for dinner. He continued to Martinsville accompanied by Indiana State Geologist John Collett, "a recognized authority on ethnological subjects" and an expert in phrenology. (John Jr. traveled for a time as a lecturer on phrenology; this may be how they knew each other.) From the pictures and the bullet hole, they both concluded the body was Watson and not Oliver. The body was shipped to Put-in-Bay, Ohio, to the home of John Jr., and was viewed with great curiosity. John Brown Jr. then had the remains shipped to North Elba for burial next to his father.

Mrs. Brown took Watson's body to their former home and her husband's tomb in North Elba, New York, the John Brown Farm, where a funeral was held. Owen and John Jr. were present, as was Franklin Sanborn. She buried him next to his father's grave in October 1882, 23 years after his death.

== The body of Oliver Brown ==
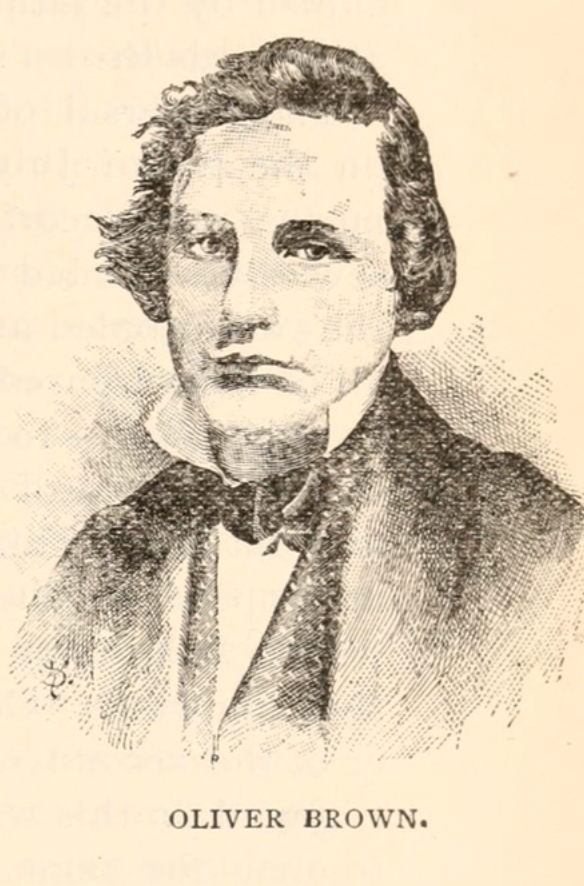
Oliver Brown

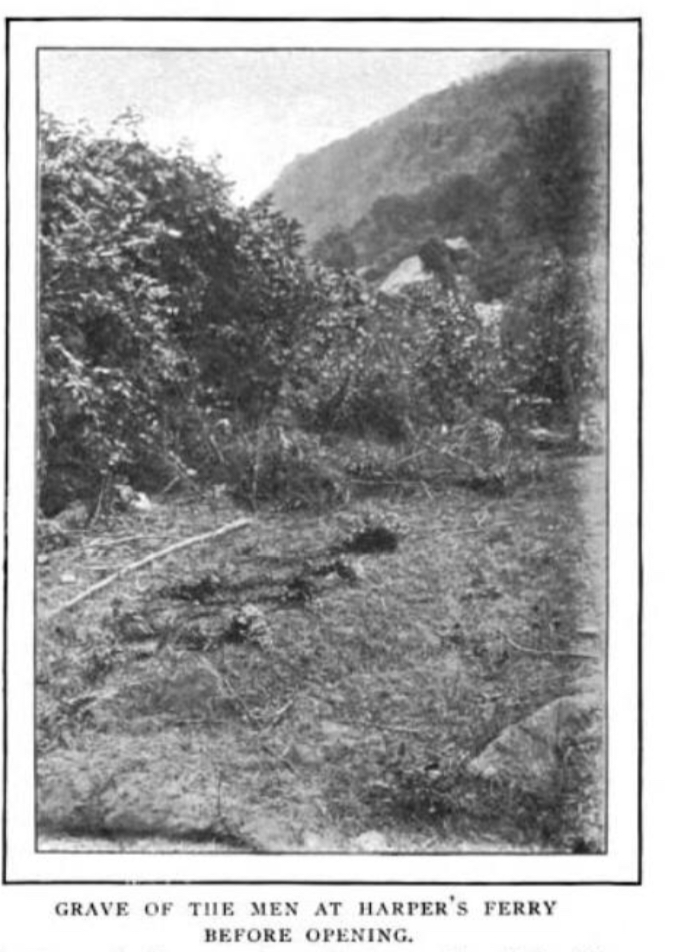
Original burial site of Oliver Brown and seven others killed at Harpers Ferry

Oliver Brown was called "a strange character" by a man who knew him, "the most original perhaps of them all", who had burned a pulpit when a church would not allow an abolitionist meeting to be held there. A source says that he "was esteemed by his mother as the most promising of her children."

Like Watson, Oliver Brown wrote his family from the Kennedy farm.

The body of Oliver Brown, and those of seven others who also died during the raid itself, were thrown in packing crates and buried in a pit in an obscure place (so it would be forgotten), without ceremony, clergy, or marker. They were briefly dug up at Governor Wise's request to permit Mary Brown to recover her son's decaying body (at that point it was not known which Brown it was), but she did not feel up to it, so they were reburied. Forty years later, in 1899, a scholar studying Brown located one of the two Black men who had been paid $5 each to bury the crates, and he led him to the spot; it was confirmed by "the memory of a number of older citizens who witnessed the burial". While the identities of those buried there were known, the remains could not be clearly distinguished. To avoid complications the bodies were surreptitiously spirited out of Virginia; the remains were put in an ordinary trunk, which was carried as luggage on a train. They were all reburied in a single handsome casket, donated by the town of North Elba, next to the graves of John and Watson Brown.

== See also ==
- John Brown's raid on Harpers Ferry
- John Brown's raiders
