= John Brown Jr. (abolitionist) =

Son of abolitionist John Brown (1821–1895)

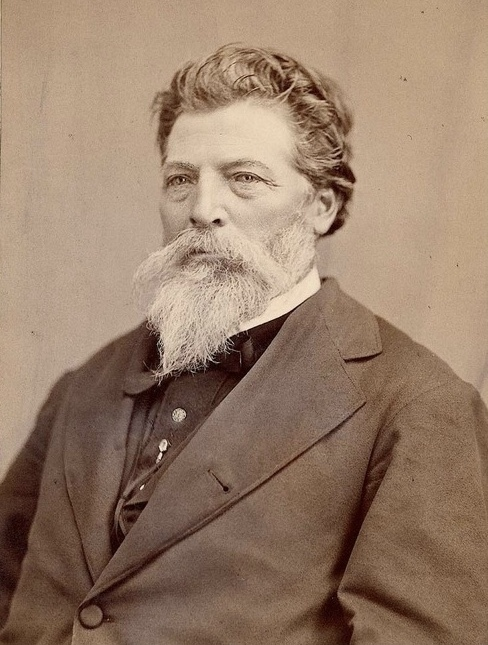
- Brown in 1894

Justice of the peace
- In office 1887–1887

Member of the Topeka Free-State Legislature
- In office March 4, 1856 – March 15, 1856

Personal details
- Born: July 25, 1821 Hudson, Ohio, U.S.
- Died: May 5, 1895 (aged 73) Put-in-Bay, Ohio, U.S.
- Spouse: Wealthy Hotchkiss (m. 1847)
- Relations: Owen Brown (grandfather); Owen Brown (brother); Watson (half-brother)
- Children: 2
- Parents: John Brown (father); Dianthe Lusk (mother)
- Education: Grand River Institute

Military service
- Allegiance: United States of America
- Years of service: 1861–1862
- Rank: Captain
- Unit: Jennison's Jayhawkers (7th Kansas Volunteer Cavalry)
- Commands: Company K
- Battles/wars: American Civil War

John Brown Jr. (July 25, 1821 – May 3, 1895) was an American farmer and soldier who was the eldest son of the abolitionist John Brown. Although he did not participate in his father's raid on Harpers Ferry, Virginia, he served as his intelligence agent and liaison. He was the captain of Company K of the 7th Kansas Volunteer Cavalry from 1861 until his resignation in 1862. After his resignation, he raised fruit until his death.

== Early life ==
Brown was born in Hudson, Ohio, to John Brown and his first wife, Dianthe Lusk Brown. His mother died when he was 11. In 1841 he tried teaching in a country school, but left it after one year, finding it frustrating and the children "snotty". In spring 1842 he enrolled at the Grand River Institute in Austinburg, Ohio. In July 1847 he married Wealthy Hotchkiss (1829–1911), who had also studied at the Grand River Institute. The couple settled in Springfield, Massachusetts, and had two children.

== Kansas ==
John Jr. moved with four of his brothers to Kansas Territory in spring 1855. While his brothers Frederick, Owen, and Salmon traveled by land, John Jr., his brother Jason, and their families traveled by boat, across the state of Missouri on the Missouri River. John Jr. described the trip as "a horrid business in a low stage of water which is a considerable portion of the year." Most of the passengers and crew were pro-slavery, and the captain deliberately left the two brothers' parties behind at a stop in Waverly, Missouri.

He was elected to the territorial legislature—the Topeka Legislature—in 1856.

John Jr. did not join his father and brothers in the Pottawatomie Massacre of May, 1856. However, he was captured by Henry Clay Pate, a border ruffian and commander of a pro-slavery militia, in connection with the murders. He was turned over to federal authority, Captain Thomas J. Wood. He was beaten by the soldiers and suffered a mental breakdown. His father, John Brown, plotted a rescue. His troops overtook pro-slavery men in the Battle of Black Jack near Palmyra on June 2, 1856. The elder Brown captured Pate and his men, provisions, horses, mules, and equipment. He agreed to release the prisoners in exchange for his sons.

A pro-slavery court in Lecompton charged John Jr. with high treason because he was a free-state politician. He was finally released from prison in September. Shortly after this, John Jr. left Kansas with his father. His father took his son's heavy chains and padlocks first to Concord to show to "Emerson and his friends", and then he held them up at antislavery meetings in different places.

== Raid on Harpers Ferry ==
John Jr. did not participate in his father's raid on Harpers Ferry, Virginia (since 1863, West Virginia). Kansapedia says that when the time came to make a decision on participation, "Brown, who was suffering from mental illness, experienced more anxiety." However, he knew all the details and was part of the process of preparing for the raid.

John Brown sent John Jr. on a journey throughout the state of Pennsylvania, wanting him to find men "of the right stripe", willing to join John Brown's raiders. The areas that John Jr. was ordered to visit, specifically, were Gettysburg, Bedford, Chambersburg, and Uniontown. John Jr. also spent time visiting Massachusetts, New York, and Canada, trying to enlist black supporters. Neither of these missions produced the desired results, and the "army" attacking the Arsenal was merely twenty-two men.

In the early summer of 1859 John travelled around what is today Ontario, Canada (Hamilton, St. Catharines, Chatham, London, Buxton, and Windsor), seeking support from Canadian negroes for his father's project. He found little support.

John Jr. acted as his father's liaison for the raid in Virginia. In 1858, John Brown sent John Jr. to Virginia. This mission was to survey the area surrounding Harper's Ferry.

Because of tensions between John Brown and other members of the plans and cause, John Brown appointed John Jr. as the intelligence agent and liaison. This meant that John Jr. would be the go-between for John Brown and other members. This provided safety for John Brown and secrecy.

John Jr. received word from his father to move the "tools" for the raid. The letter told John Jr. to do this "with perfect quiet" and to move only the tools, "not the other stuff", to a safe place where only Jr. and "the keeper" would know where they were. This cryptic message was received and Jr. travelled to Conneaut, Ohio, where the weapons had been secretly shipped, and moved them several miles south to a farm in Cherry Valley Township, Ohio.

When his brother Owen escaped capture, he took safe refuge with John Jr. at this home in northeast Ohio.

In early 1860, the U.S. Senate created a Select Committee to report on the invasion of Harper's Ferry. James M. Mason, head of the committee, submitted a resolution to compel John Jr. and two others to testify. A deputy of the Senate's Sergeant-at-Arms was sent to arrest the individuals—according to the report, Brown was then living in Ashtabula County, Ohio—and bring them to Washington. The deputy reported that Brown could not be arrested without the employment of armed force. In the summer "an armed party of twelve persons" attempted unsuccessfully to carry him off.

== Civil War and Jennison's Jayhawkers ==
In the summer of 1860, John Jr. was an agent of the "Haytian Bureau of Emigration", working under his father's former associate and biographer James Redpath. Brown served as the agent of emigration for the British North American Provinces between 1860 and 1861.

In July 1861, Brown decided to recruit a company of soldiers that would travel to Kansas and enlist with Kansas volunteer forces then operating in Missouri under the auspices of Kansas Senator James H. Lane. His intention was to enlist "abolitionists of the intense sort" and muster them under Colonel James Montgomery, one of Lane's three Lieutenants. In August he wrote to Gerrit Smith from Jefferson, Ashtabula County, Ohio, returning to him the land he had been given in North Elba. John Brown's "Sharpshooters" garnered significant press attention as they traveled from Ohio to Kansas. However, on its arrival, the company had only signed 66 men. On November 9, 1861, while Brown was still recruiting in Michigan, the company elected to join Colonel Charles R. Jennison's First Kansas Cavalry, later designated the Kansas Seventh Volunteer Cavalry, and known in Missouri as Jennison's Jayhawkers. Upon his own arrival in December, Brown was mustered in as the captain of Company K of the Kansas Seventh. Brown served as captain of the company until May 1862, when he resigned because of his rheumatoid arthritis. But according to John Jr., “Before our regiment left Missouri more than two thousand slaves were by us restored to the possession of themselves, were ‘Jayhawked’ into freedom." He was succeeded as captain of the company by his second lieutenant, George H. Hoyt, who had been one of his father's lawyers following the Harpers Ferry attack.

== Post-war ==
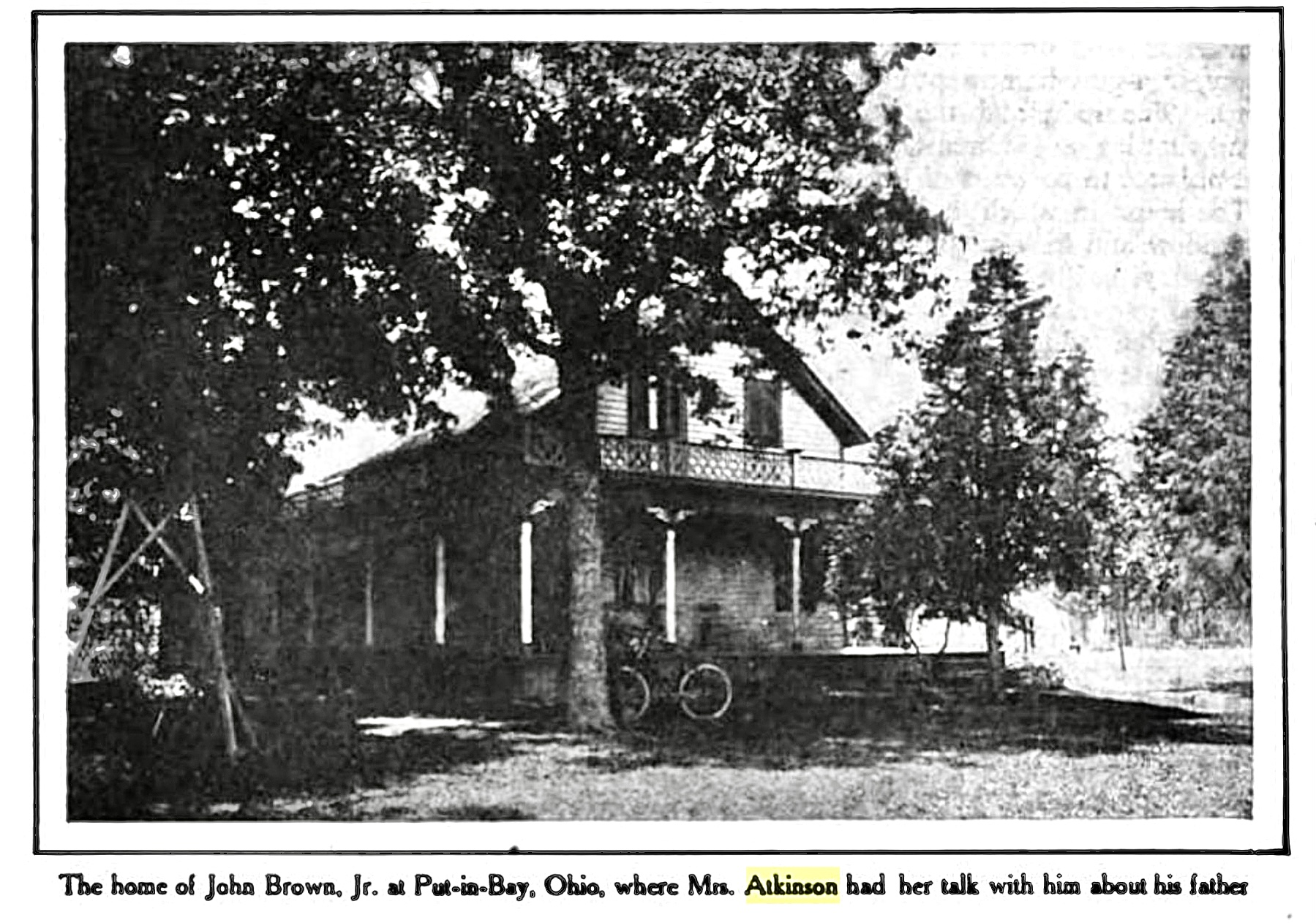
John Brown Junior's house in Put-in-Bay, Ohio

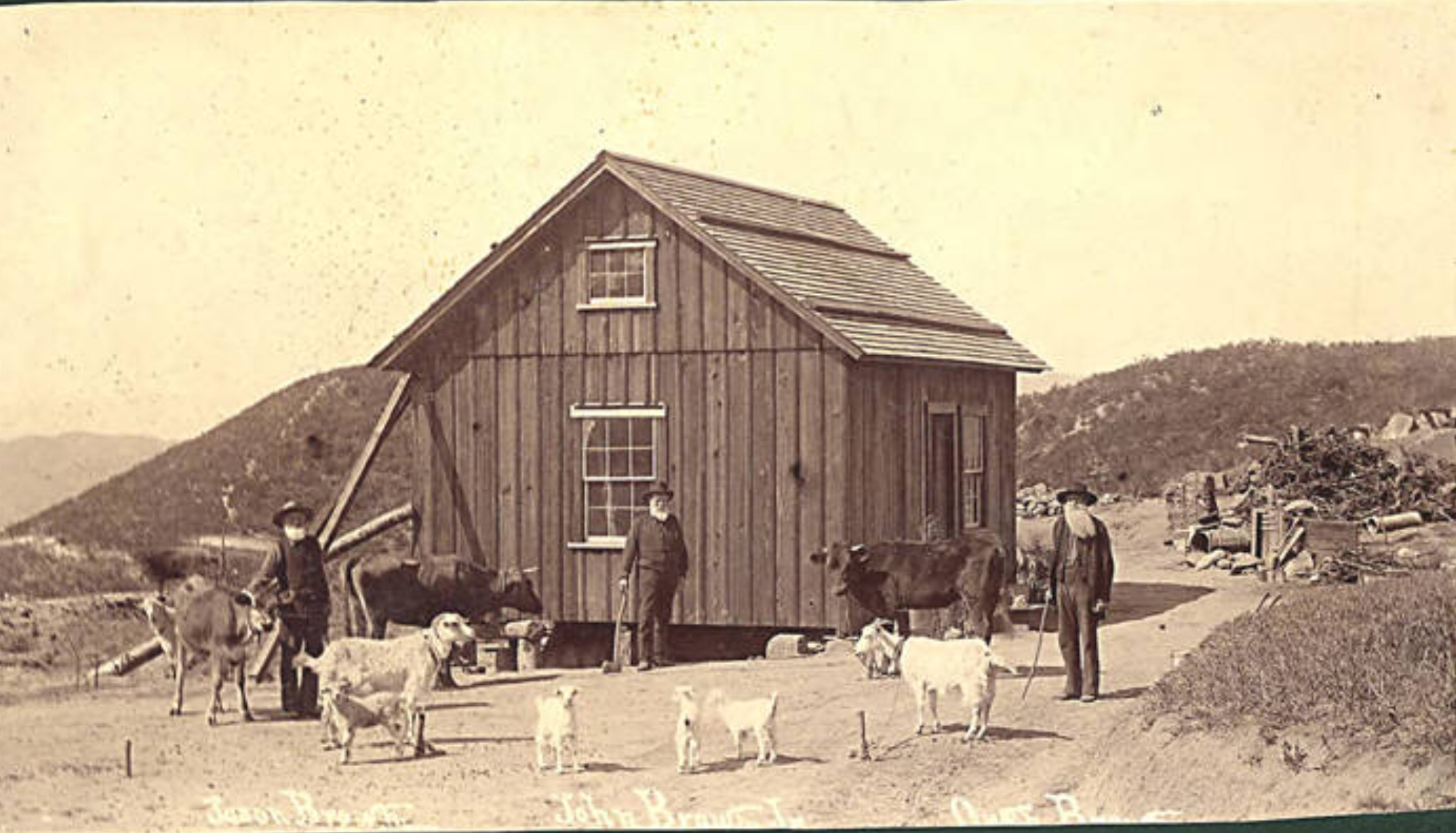
Left to right, Jason Brown, visitor John Jr., and Owen Brown, with their livestock. 1888? Near Pasadena, California.

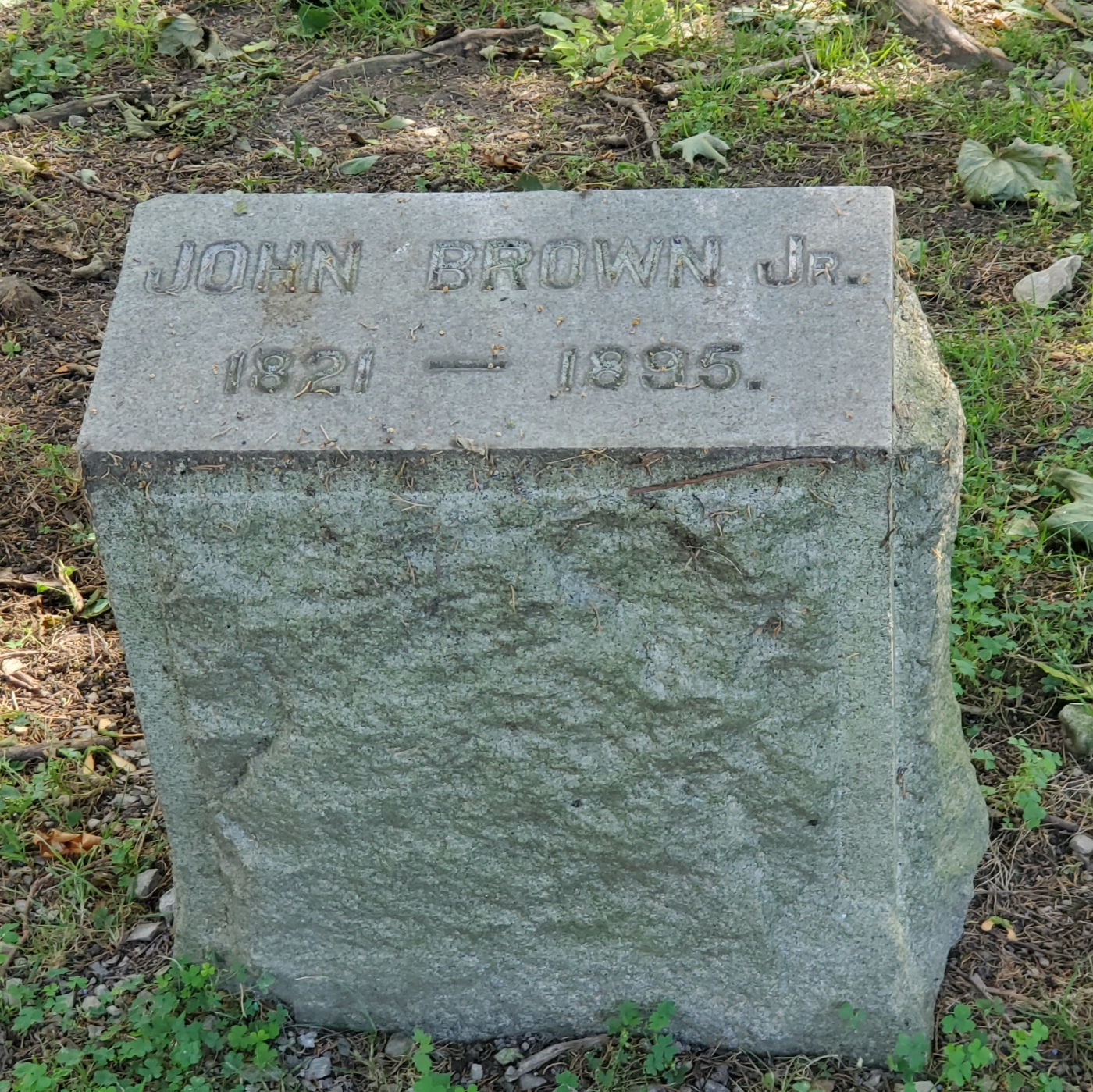
Grave of Brown in Put-in-Bay, Ohio

Following his resignation, in 1862 Brown purchased 10 acres (4.0 ha) on the south shore of South Bass Island at Put-in-Bay, Ohio, at that time sparsely populated. He and his brother Owen appear on an 1863 list of people in Put-in-Bay subject to Civil War Draft Registration. He remained there until his death, supporting himself by raising fruit. An obituary said that on a plot of 7 acres (2.8 ha) he raised "grapes for the Detroit market", and "no doubt it would have pleased his father that he never sold grapes for wine-making."

His sister Ruth and her husband Henry Thompson also lived for nineteen years at Put-in-Bay.

He became a socialist later in life. He "traveled for a time as a lecturer on phrenology".

In 1882 "Mr. Brown enjoys a standing and consideration among his neighbors that may be envied"; he was one of the community's leading citizens. That year he travelled to Martinsville, Indiana, to identify the body of his brother Watson (which had been at Winchester Medical College). He was the guest of the Governor of Indiana for dinner.

In 1883 he penned a lengthy reply to an attack upon his father's actions in Kansas, especially at the Pottawatomie massacre. Kansas Senator John James Ingalls also published a reply.

In 1887 he was a justice of the peace. In 1893 he and Wealthy attended the Chicago World's Fair as guests of the state of Kansas. He remained at Put-in-Bay until his death on May 3, 1895, living a life described as "quiet, retired, but happy." In contrast with his brother Owen, he "delights to tell the tragic story of his father's life to intimate acquaintances". He received a Masonic funeral, and thousands attended; it was described as the largest funeral ever held in Put-in-Bay. He is buried in Crown Hill Cemetery there.

== Personality ==
Brown was described by a Kansas acquaintance as "a man of education, and of more than common abilities. Strictly honest and conscientious." "His family and himself are beloved and sympathized with by his neighbors of all parties; and well he may be; for he is one of the finest specimens of men, physically and intellectually. ...He is a man who would be distinguished anywhere for his active, energetic temperament and fearless manner. Socially he is amiable, warm hearted and affectionate."

Brown's visitor about 1871 described him as a "quiet, genial, warm-hearted farmer, amateur geologist, and land surveyor"; a later one as "sunny, cheery-voiced", with "fine manners and an easy address".

== In popular culture ==
He is portrayed by Dennis Weaver in the 1955 American historical drama film Seven Angry Men.

In The Good Lord Bird, a 2020 Showtime Limited Series based on the 2013 novel of the same name, he is played by Nick Eversman.

Wealthy and her family are characters in the novel John Brown's Women.

== Archival material ==
Papers of John Brown Jr. are held by the Rutherford B. Hayes Presidential Center, Fremont, Ohio, and the Ohio Historical Society, Columbus, Ohio. His 1861–63 correspondence with his wife Wealthy (162 pages) is at the Kansas Historical Society, Topeka, Kansas. Several pages in various letters are written in numerical code, which he left a key to, and have been transcribed. A few other letters of John Jr. are also available there.

== Published writing ==
- Brown, John Jr. (December 1909). Atkinson, Eleanor (ed.). "The Soul of John Brown. Recollections of the Great Abolitionist by his Son". American Magazine. Vol. 68, no. 6. pp. 633–643.

== Notes ==
=== Sources ===
- Ables, Jules (1971). Man On Fire: John Brown and the Cause of Liberty.
- Fox, Simeon M. (1902). Story of the Seventh Kansas. Topeka: Kansas State Historical Society.
- Hoyt, Bill (2012). Good Hater: George Henry Hoyt's War on Slavery. Garland, KS: Bill Hoyt.
- Oates, Stephen B. (1970). To Purge This Land with Blood. New York: Harper & Rowe.
- Sanborn, Franklin, ed. (1891). The Life and Letters of John Brown.
- Warch, Richard; Fanton, Jonathan, eds. (1973). Great Lives Observed: John Brown.
