= Flournoy, California =

Flournoy
- census-designated place
- Location of Flournoy in Tehama County, California.

- Position in California.
- Coordinates: 39°55′38″N 122°26′37″W
- Country: United States
- State: California
- County: Tehama

Area
  - Total: 5.855 sq mi (15.165 km^{2})
  - Land: 5.855 sq mi (15.165 km^{2})
  - Water: 0 sq mi (0 km^{2}) 0%
- Elevation: 594 ft (181 m)

Population (2020)
  - Total: 117
  - Density: 20.0/sq mi (7.72/km^{2})
- Time zone: UTC-8 (Pacific (PST))
  - Summer (DST): UTC-7 (PDT)
- ZIP Code: 96029
- GNIS feature ID: 2628732

Flournoy is a census-designated place (CDP) in Tehama County, California, United States. Flournoy sits at an elevation of 594 feet (181 m). Flournoy is located in the south-western part of the county, approximately halfway between the city of Corning and the town of Paskenta, located on Thomes Creek. The zip code is 96029. The 2020 United States census reported Flournoy's population was 117.

== History ==
A post office was established at Flournoy in 1908, and remained in operation until 1966. The community has the name of George H. Flournoy, a local rancher and Civil War veteran.

Flournoy was home to one of the last one-room schoolhouses in Northern California. The school, which opened in 1921, was given a state grant in 2001 to expand. The enrollment at the time was 34 students. The one-room school had been built in 1974, replacing an earlier structure, and was said to be "the most modern structure in tiny Flournoy" in 1991.

== Geography ==
According to the United States Census Bureau, the CDP covers an area of 5.9 square miles (15 km^{2}), all land.

=== Climate ===
This region experiences warm (but not hot) and dry summers, with no average monthly temperatures above 71.6 °F. According to the Köppen Climate Classification system, Flournoy has a warm-summer Mediterranean climate, abbreviated "Csb" on climate maps.

== Demographics ==
Historical population
Census	Pop.	Note	%±
2010	101		—
2020	117		15.8%
U.S. Decennial Census; 1860–1870 1880-1890; 1900 1910 1920; 1930 1940 1950; 1960 1970 1980; 1990 2000 2010

Flournoy first appeared as a census designated place in the 2010 U.S. census.

The 2020 United States census reported that Flournoy had a population of 117. The population density was 20.0 inhabitants per square mile (7.7/km^{2}). The racial makeup of Flournoy was 70 (59.8%) White, 1 (0.9%) African American, 6 (5.1%) Native American, 3 (2.6%) Asian, 3 (2.6%) Pacific Islander, 24 (20.5%) from other races, and 10 (8.5%) from two or more races. Hispanic or Latino of any race were 22 persons (18.8%).

The whole population lived in households. There were 46 households, out of which 13 (28.3%) had children under the age of 18 living in them, 35 (76.1%) were married-couple households, 0 (0.0%) were cohabiting couple households, 5 (10.9%) had a female householder with no partner present, and 6 (13.0%) had a male householder with no partner present. 6 households (13.0%) were one person, and 4 (8.7%) were one person aged 65 or older. The average household size was 2.54. There were 40 families (87.0% of all households).

The age distribution was 28 people (23.9%) under the age of 18, 13 people (11.1%) aged 18 to 24, 31 people (26.5%) aged 25 to 44, 24 people (20.5%) aged 45 to 64, and 21 people (17.9%) who were 65 years of age or older. The median age was 39.8 years. There were 66 males and 51 females.

There were 46 housing units at an average density of 7.9 units per square mile (3.1 units/km^{2}), which were all occupied, 42 (91.3%) by homeowners, and 4 (8.7%) by renters.
