= National Register of Historic Places listings in Winchester, Virginia =

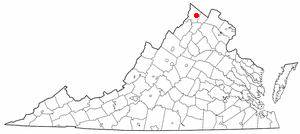
Location of Winchester in Virginia

This is a list of the National Register of Historic Places listings in Winchester, Virginia.

This is intended to be a complete list of the properties and districts on the National Register of Historic Places in the independent city of Winchester, Virginia, United States. The locations of National Register properties and districts for which the latitude and longitude coordinates are included below, may be seen in an online map.

There are 23 properties and districts listed on the National Register in the city, including 2 National Historic Landmarks.

This National Park Service list is complete through NPS recent listings posted June 20, 2025.

== Current listings ==
	Name on the Register	Image	Date listed	Location	Description
1	Abram's Delight	Abram's Delight	April 11, 1973 (#73002230)	Parkview St. and Rouss Spring Rd. 39°10′10″N 78°09′38″W	Oldest house in Winchester, built by Simon Taylor in 1754, for Isaac Hollingsworth, the son of Abraham Hollingsworth, who arrived in 1728.
2	Patsy Cline House	Patsy Cline House	November 8, 2005 (#05001230)	608 S. Kent St. 39°10′41″N 78°09′52″W	
3	Douglas School	Douglas School	May 26, 2000 (#00000558)	598 N. Kent St. 39°11′33″N 78°09′30″W	Built in 1927 as a "separate but equal" school for African American students but converted to a community center in 1966 after desegregation; may have been named for Frederick Douglass, despite the spelling difference.
4	Fair Mount	Fair Mount	January 16, 2004 (#03001431)	311 Fairmont Ave. 39°11′19″N 78°10′07″W	Built in 1809 by Lewis Barnett for local merchant Joseph Tidball; remodeled in 1929 in Colonial Revival Style.
5	Fort Loudoun Site	Fort Loudoun Site	June 26, 2014 (#13000650)	419 N. Loudoun St. 39°11′21″N 78°09′50″W	Archaeological site of fort erected under George Washington's supervision.
6	Frederick County Courthouse	Frederick County Courthouse	July 5, 2001 (#01000690)	20 N. Loudoun St. 39°11′04″N 78°09′54″W	
7	Glen Burnie	Glen Burnie	September 10, 1979 (#79003305)	801 Amherst St. 39°11′14″N 78°10′42″W	Built in 1794 by Robert Wood, son of James and Mary Wood, who founded Frederick Town (later Winchester) in 1744.
8	Handley Library	Handley Library	November 12, 1969 (#69000364)	Northwestern corner of Braddock and Piccadilly Sts. 39°11′13″N 78°09′59″W	Funded by Scranton, Pennsylvania, coal baron, Judge John Handley, and built by New York architects J. Stewart Barney and Henry Otis Chapman, it is "perhaps Virginia's purest expression of the regal and florid Beaux Arts classicism." It opened in August 1913.
9	John Handley High School	John Handley High School	August 14, 1998 (#98001070)	425 Handley Boulevard; 39°10′40″N 78°10′34″W	
10	Hawthorne and Old Town Spring	Hawthorne and Old Town Spring	June 5, 2013 (#13000364)	610 and 730 Amherst St. 39°11′19″N 78°10′34″W	Late Georgian- to Federal-style stone house built in 1811, a spring house built in 1816, and a spring.
11	Hexagon House	Hexagon House	September 10, 1987 (#87001550)	530 Amherst St. 39°11′16″N 78°10′30″W	Completed in 1874 by architect Brice Leatherman for James W. Burgess in a style designed to open up interior space and let in more natural light. Even rarer than octagon houses built on similar principles.
12	Thomas J. Jackson Headquarters	Thomas J. Jackson Headquarters	May 28, 1967 (#67000027)	415 N. Braddock St. 39°11′22″N 78°09′57″W	
13	Adam Kurtz House	Adam Kurtz House	May 17, 1976 (#76002233)	Northeastern corner of Braddock and Cork Sts. 39°10′57″N 78°10′04″W	The house served as George Washington's headquarters while he was supervising the construction of Fort Loudoun in 1755-1756.
14	Daniel Morgan House	Daniel Morgan House	February 5, 2013 (#12001274)	226 Amherst St. 39°11′10″N 78°10′09″W	
15	Mount Hebron Cemetery and Gatehouse	Mount Hebron Cemetery and Gatehouse	March 20, 2009 (#09000163)	305 E. Boscawen St. 39°10′57″N 78°09′35″W	Established in 1844 on two older churchyards. Expanded in 1866 to include Stonewall Cemetery for 2,576 Confederate war dead. Iron fence added in 1891 and limestone gatehouse for superintendent added in 1902.
16	Old Stone Church	Old Stone Church	August 18, 1977 (#77001538)	304 E. Piccadilly St. 39°11′08″N 78°09′35″W	
17	C. L. Robinson Ice and Cold Storage Corporation	C. L. Robinson Ice and Cold Storage Corporation	June 6, 2022 (#100007794)	536-580 North Cameron St. 39°11′30″N 78°09′40″W	Built in stages between 1916 and 1981 and was known as the Zeropak Corporation from 1976 until its closure in 1997.
18	Triangle Diner	Triangle Diner	March 31, 2010 (#10000148)	27 W. Gerrard St. 39°10′37″N 78°10′11″W	
19	Virginia Apple Storage Warehouse	Virginia Apple Storage Warehouse	September 7, 2022 (#100008136)	1955 Valley Ave. 39°09′57″N 78°10′53″W	
20	The George Washington Hotel	The George Washington Hotel	June 24, 2010 (#10000383)	103 E. Piccadilly St. 39°11′08″N 78°09′47″W	
21	Winchester Coca-Cola Bottling Works	Winchester Coca-Cola Bottling Works	September 12, 2008 (#08000895)	1720 Valley Ave. 39°10′14″N 78°10′38″W	
22	Winchester Historic District	Winchester Historic District	March 4, 1980 (#80004318)	U.S. Routes 11, 17/50, and 522; also 120 and 126 N. Kent St.; also the 300-400 blocks of N. Cameron St., 12 Clark St., 110 E. Fairfax La. and 145 N. Baker St.; also Amherst, Boscawen, Gerrard, Pall Mall, and Stewart Sts. 39°11′02″N 78°10′00″W	Second, third, and fourth sets of boundaries represent boundary increases of February 20, 2003, September 12, 2008, and January 5, 2016
23	Winchester National Cemetery	Winchester National Cemetery	February 26, 1996 (#96000032)	401 National Ave. 39°11′03″N 78°09′25″W	

== See also ==
- List of National Historic Landmarks in Virginia
- National Register of Historic Places listings in Virginia
- National Register of Historic Places listings in Frederick County, Virginia
