= Mary Greenhow Lee =

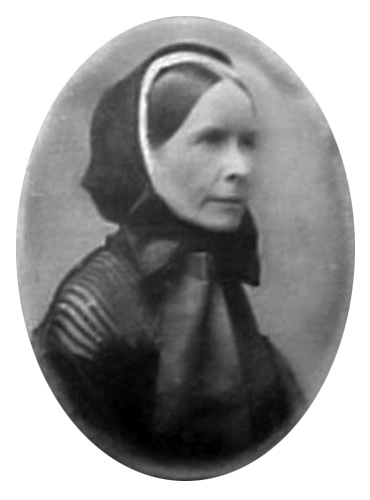
- Born: September 9, 1819; Richmond, Virginia
- Died: May 25, 1907 (aged 87); Baltimore, Maryland
- Known for: Diarist during the Civil War
- Father: Robert Greenhow

Mary Greenhow Lee (September 9, 1819–May 25, 1907) was an American diarist from Virginia. During the Civil War, Lee was a Confederate activist who kept a journal of events occurring in Winchester. According to the Virginia Department of Historic Resources (VDHR), Lee's writings "survives as one of the most informative records of daily life in Civil War Virginia."

== Early life ==
Lee was born September 9, 1819, in Richmond, Virginia to a wealthy socialite family. Her father was businessman Robert Greenhow, a former mayor of Richmond and member of the Virginia General Assembly, and his second wife, Mary Lorraine Charlton Greenhow of Yorktown. Greenhow owned a mercantile firm as well as land throughout the city and surrounding Henrico County. Lee's childhood home was a large octagonal two-story structure near the State Capitol built by former Secretary of State and Virginia governor Edmund Randolph. At least a dozen slaves were forced to assist running their home.

Lee had two siblings. James Washington Greenhow, a brother two years her senior, grew up to become a lawyer. Robert Greenhow Jr., twenty-one years her senior, was her step-brother. Robert worked at the State Department during Andrew Jackson's presidency and Lee would spend time in Washington, D.C., with him and his wife, Rose O'Neal Greenhow. Rose and Lee had similar outgoing personalities and became close friends. Lee would accompany Rose to social events in Washington including tea with former First Lady Dolley Madison and an event where Lee flirted with President Martin Van Buren's son. In 1843, Lee moved to Winchester after marrying Hugh Holmes Lee, a lawyer and distant cousin. He died October 10, 1856, but his two unmarried sisters, Antoniette and Laura, and four nephew and nieces from a deceased sister continued living with Lee, along with five slaves.

== Civil War era ==
During the Civil War, Lee kept a thorough journal of events in Winchester. According to Lee's biographer, Sheila R. Phipps, "historians learned not only what civilian life was like during the war but also minute details of troop movements and casualty numbers." Several battles took place in Winchester and the surrounding area. Between these battles the city was occupied by Union troops several times. When Union troops arrived during the first occupation, Lee wrote in her diary "All is over and we are prisoners in our own homes." Lee assisted with caring for and feeding wounded Confederate soldiers at a war hospital on Cameron Street. Even though she despised the Union troops, Lee would care for them as well if they needed assistance at the hospital. Although she didn't have much to spare, Lee would give the wounded homemade soup and bread. As the war progressed, Lee ran out of staple items such as firewood. She would sometimes skip days in her journal because her hands were too cold to write.

Lee despised the northerners, shunning them at all costs, and "did anything to irritate the Union." The Union soldiers nicknamed Lee and the women of Winchester "she-devils" because of their attitudes. In February 1865, Union general Philip Sheridan banished Lee from Winchester for constantly snubbing Union officers. She never returned even after the war concluded.

== Later years ==
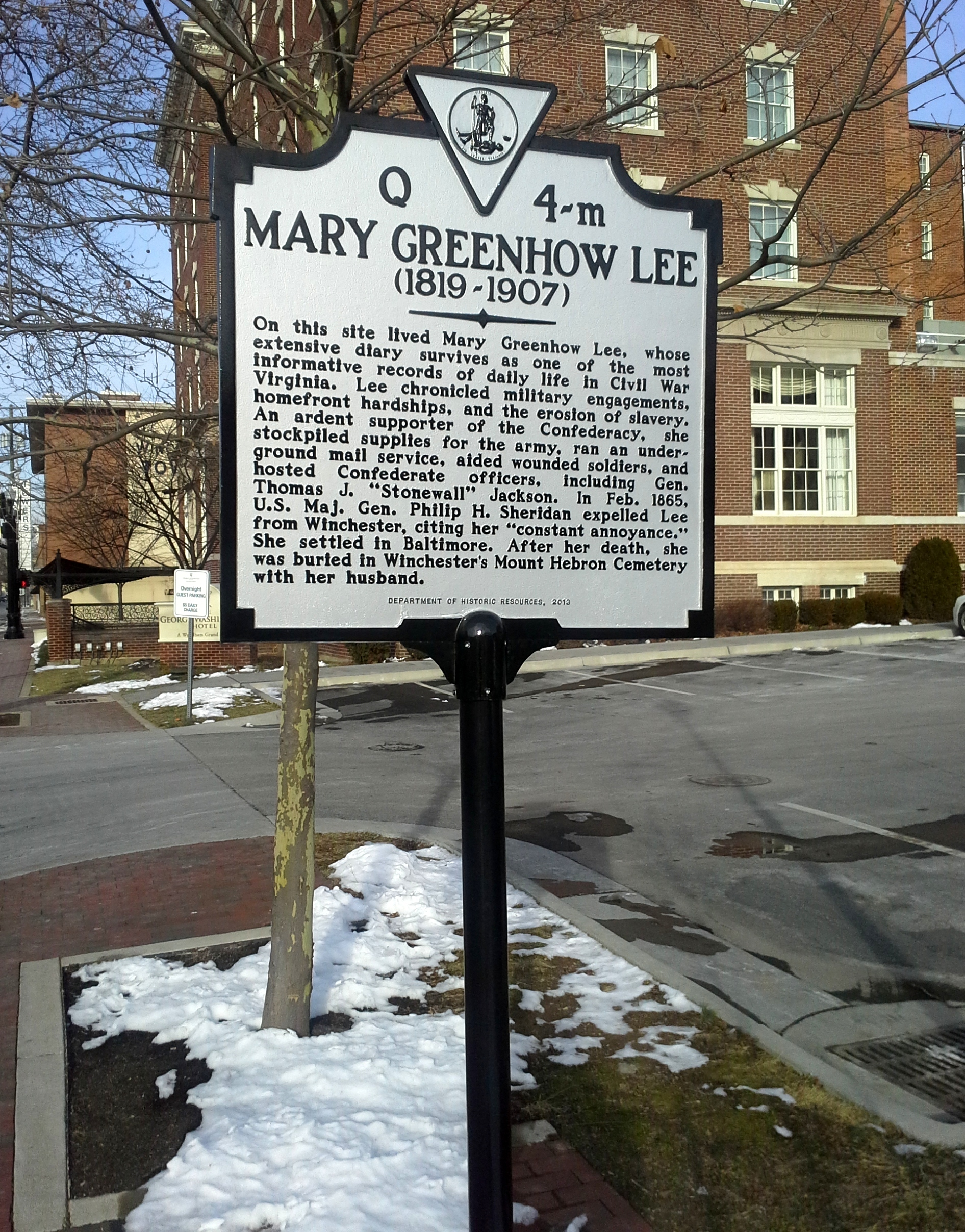
Historical marker in Winchester noting the site of Lee's former house.

After leaving Winchester, Lee and her family spent time in Staunton, Virginia, before settling in Baltimore, Maryland, where she operated boardinghouses to support herself and her family. Lee was active in an organization whose mission was to build schools in the South. She was also an officer in the local chapter of the United Daughters of the Confederacy. Lee died of renal failure on May 25, 1907. Following a memorial service in Baltimore, her body was taken to Winchester where she was buried in Mount Hebron Cemetery.

== Legacy ==
In 2011, one of Lee's journals was published, titled The Civil War Journal of Mary Greenhow Lee. It was transcribed and edited by Eloise C. Strader, a former president of the Winchester-Frederick County Historical Society. In July 2013, the VDHR approved the placement of a historical marker at the site of Lee's house, now demolished. The following November the marker was installed at 132 N. Cameron Street, next to The George Washington Hotel. A dedication ceremony was hosted by the Winchester-Frederick County Historical Society, which paid for the marker, with speeches made by the organization's president and the chairman of the VDHR. The historical marker states:

Mary Greenhow Lee, who lived in this house, is best known for the extensive diary she kept to record daily life in Winchester during the Civil War. An ardent supporter of the Confederacy, she provided assistance to wounded Confederates throughout the war and funneled supplies to the army. On 23 Feb. 1865, Union Maj. Gen. Philip H. Sheridan banished Lee from his lines because of her "constant annoyance." Lee left her home in Winchester and departed the Shenandoah Valley. After the Civil War she settled in Baltimore and operated a boardinghouse.

Lee's original Civil War journal is housed in the archives of Winchester's Handley Library. Another journal she wrote while staying with her brother in Washington, D.C., is housed at the Maryland Historical Society's offices in Baltimore.

== Publications ==
- The Civil War Journal of Mary Greenhow Lee, Eloise C. Strader (editor), Winchester-Frederick County Historical Society, Winchester, 2011. ISBN 9780923198435
