= Fort Loudoun (Virginia) =

Archaeological site in Virginia, United States

- Fort Loudoun Site
- U.S. National Register of Historic Places
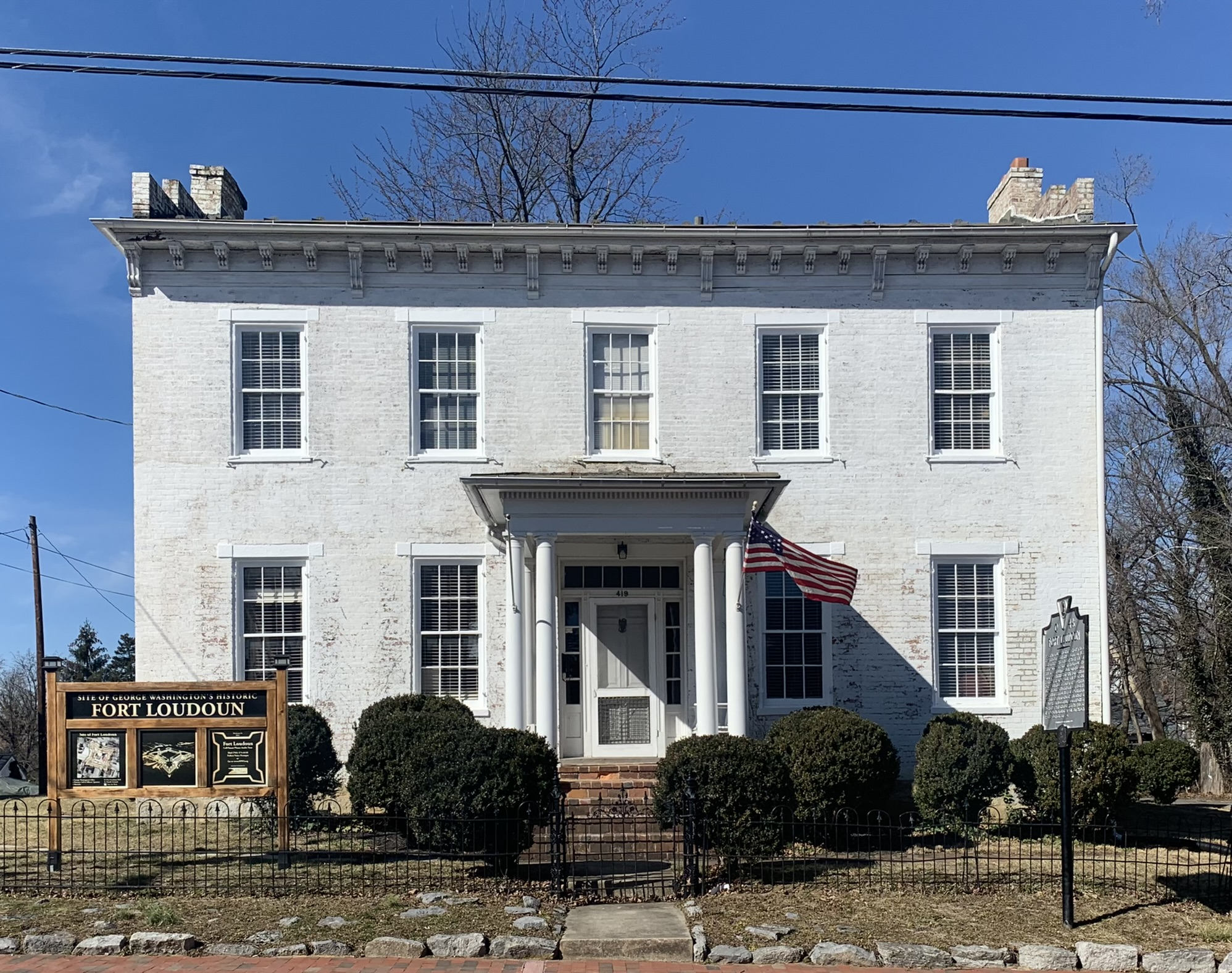
- Building on the fort site, February 2022

- Location within Virginia
- Location: 419 North Loudoun Street, Winchester, Virginia
- Coordinates: 39°11′21″N 78°9′50″W
- Area: Less than one acre
- Built: 1756–1757
- NRHP reference No.: 13000650
- Added to NRHP: June 26, 2014

Fort Loudoun was a historic fortification of the French and Indian War, located in what is now Winchester, Virginia. The fort was built between 1756 and 1758 under the supervision of George Washington, then a colonel in the Virginia Regiment. It was named for John Campbell, 4th Earl of Loudoun, who commanded the British forces in North America for a time during the war. Washington and his militia regiment were headquartered at the fort for two years. The fort was a roughly square bastioned earthworks, whose extent spread across where North Loudoun Street runs.

The property at 419 North Loudoun encompasses the historic heart of the fort, including a well dating to the fort's construction, and a portion of its northwest bastion. This area has been listed on the National Register of Historic Places. This property is now owned by the non-profit French and Indian War Foundation.

== See also ==
- Adam Kurtz House, Washington's headquarters while the fort was under construction, now a museum
- National Register of Historic Places listings in Winchester, Virginia
