= Abram's Delight =

Historic house in Virginia, US

- U.S. National Register of Historic Places
- Virginia Landmarks Register
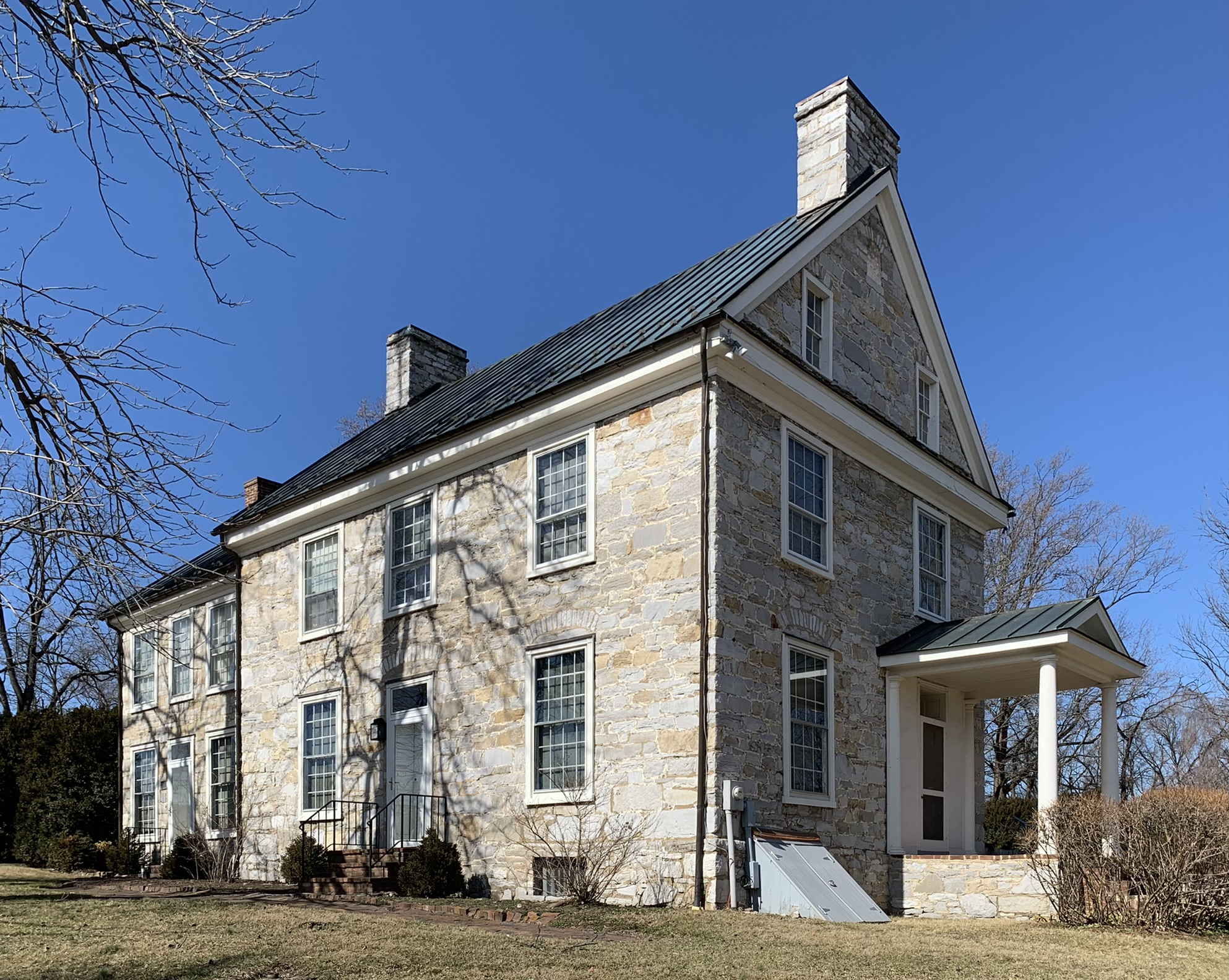
- Abram's Delight, February 2022

- Location within Virginia Location within the United States
- Location: 1340 S. Pleasant Valley Road Winchester, Virginia
- Coordinates: 39°10′9″N 78°9′39″W
- Area: 9 acres (3.6 ha)
- Built: 1754
- Built by: Simon Taylor
- Architectural style: Colonial vernacular
- NRHP reference No.: 73002230
- VLR No.: 138-0029

Significant dates
- Added to NRHP: April 11, 1973
- Designated VLR: November 9, 1972

Abram's Delight is a historic home located in Winchester, Virginia. Built in 1754, it is the oldest house in the city. It was owned by the Hollingsworth family for almost 200 years and is typical of the Shenandoah Valley architecture of the Scotch-Irish settlers. The property was added to the Virginia Landmarks Register (VLR) in 1972 and the National Register of Historic Places (NRHP) in 1973. Abram's Delight currently serves as a historic house museum.

== History ==
In 1728, Abraham Hollingsworth (born 1686), grandson of Valentine Hollingsworth, a Quaker immigrant from Ireland, arrived in the Shenandoah Valley and settled in present-day Winchester. He received a land grant of 582 acres (236 ha) around 1732 from Alexander Ross and Morgan Bryan, though he had to later renegotiate the grant with Lord Fairfax, who owned all the land between the Potomac and Rappahannock Rivers. Some historians believe Hollingsworth was also required to pay local Shawnee members a cow, a calf, and a piece of red cloth for the land. Hollingsworth, considered the founder of Winchester, described his land a "delight to behold." He built a log cabin next to a natural spring and just west of where the current house is located. Although the cabin no longer stands, the cabin's hand-dug well is still visible. Historians believe a wooden stockade once surrounded his home and that he began construction of the present house before his death in 1748. His widow, Ann Robinson (born around 1690), inherited the property but died the following year. Their second son, Isaac (1722–1759), a Quaker minister, inherited the property and made plans for a house that could also serve as a Quaker meeting place. Simon Taylor was chosen to build the home. He had recently completed construction of Springdale for Colonel John Hite, now the oldest house in Frederick County, and the two homes share similar stonework. Quakers held meetings in the Hollingsworth house with men sitting in the parlor and women in the dining room.

Isaac's son, Jonah Hollingsworth (1755–1801), later inherited the property. He and his wife, Hannah (1755–1836), had thirteen children and needed more living space. Around 1800, they added a west wing to the house and used stone closely resembling that of the original portion. In 1830, one of their sons, David (1789–1859), a wealthy businessman and community leader, took possession of the home. He made many improvements to the house and surrounding land, most notably the construction of a lake on the south side of the property. He built a summer house on one of the islands in the lake. David's three children inherited the property in 1863, two years after the Civil War began. During the war, many properties in Winchester and the surrounding area suffered, including the Hollingsworth home. Most of the property's trees were felled, the livestock was taken, and the farmland was left untended. The three children, none of whom ever married, continued living in the house until the youngest, Annie (1844–1930), was the last one remaining. In the 1910s, Annie made arrangements with two cousins that they could take ownership of the house if they would care for her in her old age. She moved out of the home, taking only her clothing, and the building sat unoccupied for almost thirty years.

In 1943, the city of Winchester purchased the home and surrounding 35 acres (14 ha). The city wanted to preserve the oldest house in Winchester and to take advantage of the water supply. The remaining belongings in the home, including many antiques dating from the 17th century and paintings by Annie's older sister, Mary, were sold at auction in 1945. The Winchester-Frederick County Historical Society worked for nine years on restoration of the house with Irvan O'Connell overseeing the overall project and Mary Boxley overseeing the interior work. In 1961, the house was opened as a museum. A log cabin, built in 1780 and similar to the one built by Abraham, was moved to the property in 1967. Abram's Delight was added to the VLR on November 9, 1972, and the NRHP on April 11, 1973. The property, which is reportedly haunted by several ghosts, is available for tours each day from April–October. During the Christmas season, Abram's Delight is available for tours during the annual Candlelight Tour and Open House. In addition to the house and log cabin, there is a small perennial garden and old gristmill that now serves as a gift shop and exhibit space.

== Architecture ==
Abram's Delight is considered an "excellent example of a substantial eighteenth century Valley farmhouse" and the central hall two-over-two plan is a classic example of the early settlers' architecture. The exterior of the house is made of random rubble limestone and rests on a stone foundation. Slate covers the pitched roof. The original portion is three bays wide and measures 39 feet (12 m). The wing added in 1800 is also three bays wide and measures 20 feet (6.1 m) long. Both sections of the home are two-stories, though the wing is not as tall in deference to the original portion. There are three interior-end chimneys, one on the end of the wing and one on each end of the original portion. There are five doorways, two on the north side, two on the south side, and one on the east side.

== See also ==
- List of museums in Virginia
- National Register of Historic Places listings in Winchester, Virginia
