= Adam Kurtz House =

Historic house in Virginia, United States

- U.S. National Register of Historic Places
- U.S. Historic district – Contributing property
- Virginia Landmarks Register
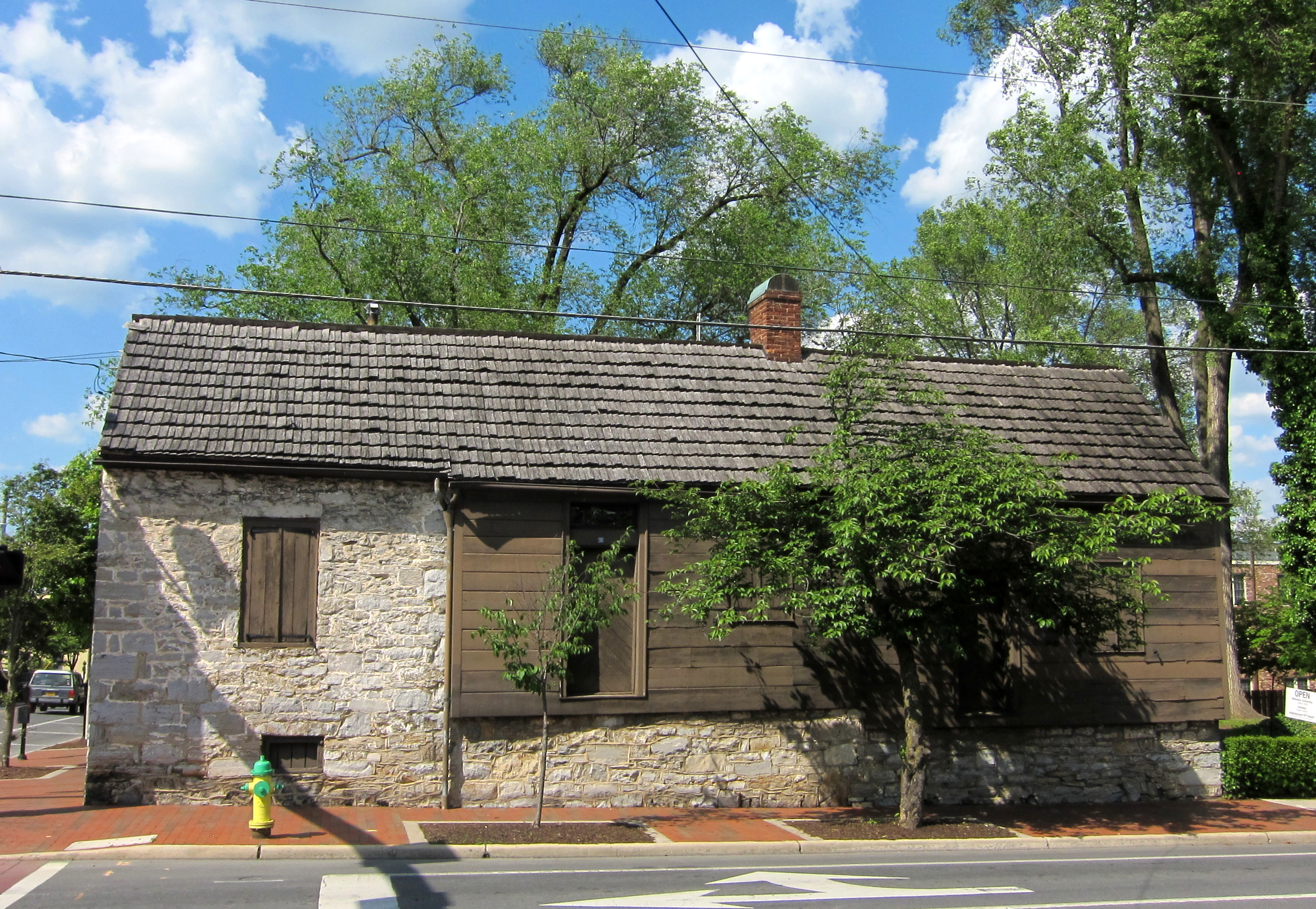
- Adam Kurtz House, May 2016

- Location within Virginia Location within the United States
- Location: NE corner of Braddock and Cork Sts., Winchester, Virginia
- Coordinates: 39°10′56″N 78°10′5″W
- Area: less than one acre
- Built: c. 1757
- Part of: Winchester Historic District (ID80004318)
- NRHP reference No.: 76002233
- VLR No.: 138-0025

Significant dates
- Added to NRHP: May 17, 1976
- Designated CP: March 4, 1980
- Designated VLR: December 16, 1975

Adam Kurtz House, also known as Washington's Headquarters, is a historic home located at Winchester, Virginia. It was built about 1755, and is of hewn-log construction. It consists of three rooms, with the westernmost room having two of its three exterior walls of stone construction. It sits on a rubble limestone foundation.

The house served as George Washington's headquarters while he was supervising the construction of Fort Loudoun from the fall of 1755 until he moved into the fort in December 1756.

It was added to the National Register of Historic Places in 1976. It is located in the Winchester Historic District.

== See also ==
- National Register of Historic Places listings in Winchester, Virginia
