= Hexagon House =

Historic house in Virginia, United States

- U.S. National Register of Historic Places
- Virginia Landmarks Register
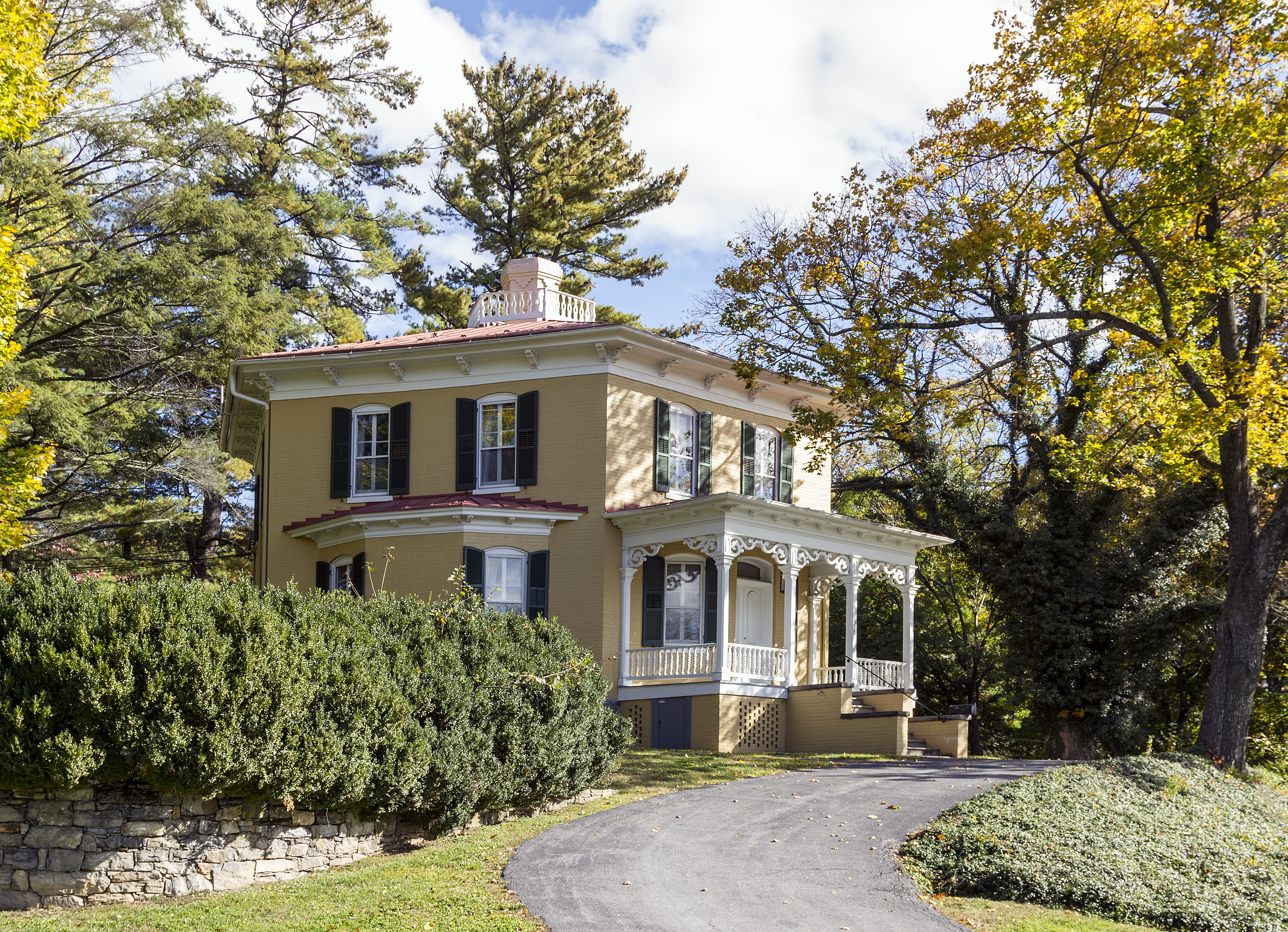
- Hexagon House, 2012

- Location within Virginia Location within the United States
- Location: 530 Amherst St., Winchester, Virginia
- Coordinates: 39°11′15″N 78°10′32″W
- Area: 1 acre (0.40 ha)
- Built: 1871-1873
- Architect: Leathers, B.
- Architectural style: Hexagon House
- NRHP reference No.: 87001550
- VLR No.: 138-0034

Significant dates
- Added to NRHP: September 10, 1987
- Designated VLR: April 21, 1987

Hexagon House is a historic home in Winchester, Virginia built between 1871 and 1873 and is a two-story, hexagon floor-plan, brick dwelling, with semi-hexagonal ground-floor projections and an ornate three-bay veranda-style porch on the principal façade. It has a central chimney and is topped by dark red, low-pitched roofs extending to substantial white cornicing.

The house was designed by architect Brice Leatherman for James W. Burgess in a style designed to open up interior space and let in more natural light, and was completed in 1873. Its hexagonal elements are even rarer than octagon houses built on similar principles.

It was added to the National Register of Historic Places in 1987.

== See also ==
- National Register of Historic Places listings in Winchester, Virginia
