= Old Stone Church (Winchester, Virginia) =

Historic church in Virginia, United States

- U.S. National Register of Historic Places
- Virginia Landmarks Register
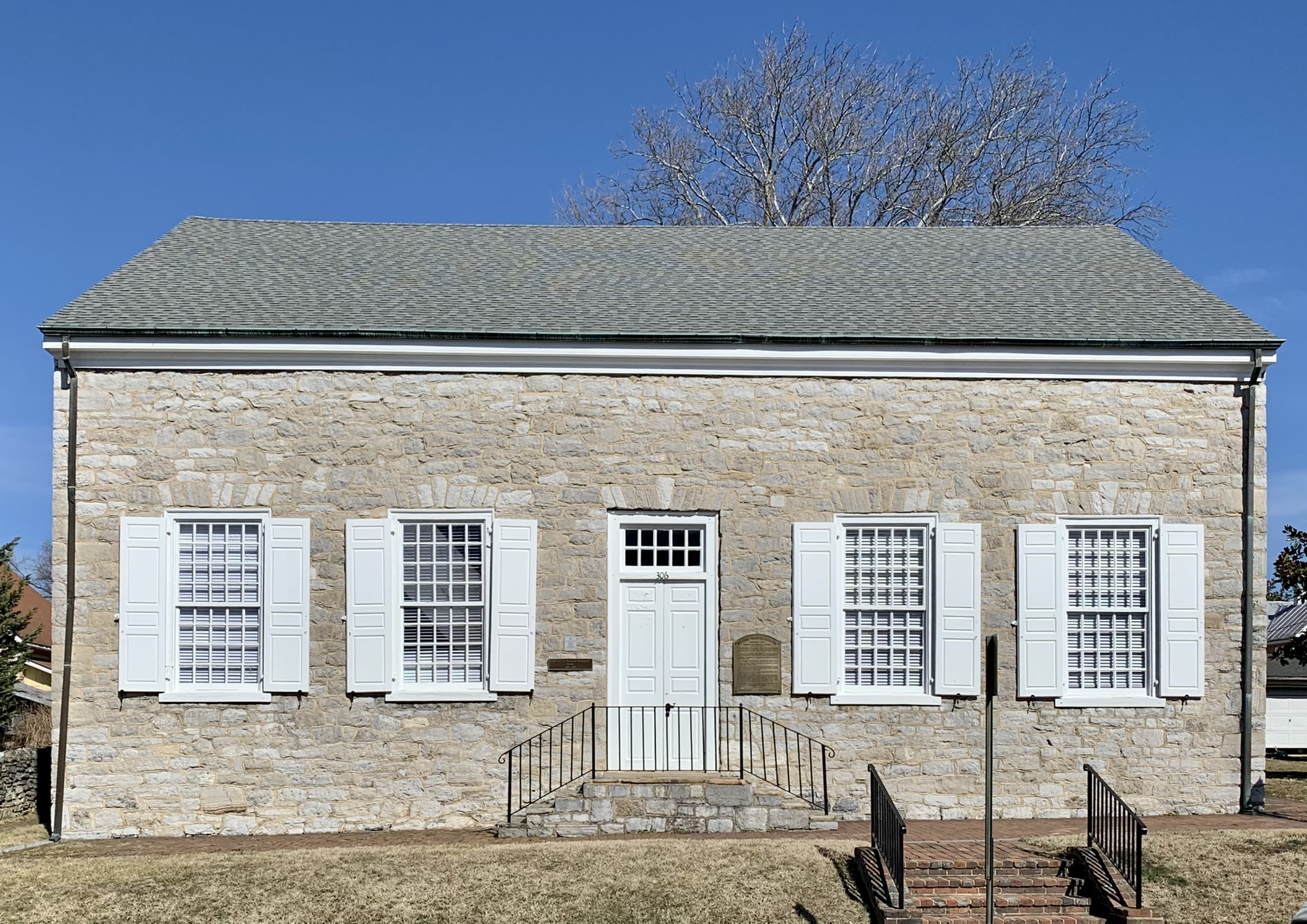
- Old Stone Church, February 2022

- Location within Virginia Location within the United States
- Location: 304 E. Piccadilly St., Winchester, Virginia
- Coordinates: 39°11′6″N 78°9′38″W
- Area: less than one acre
- Built: 1788
- NRHP reference No.: 77001538
- VLR No.: 138-0019

Significant dates
- Added to NRHP: August 18, 1977
- Designated VLR: December 21, 1976

Old Stone Church (also known as the Presbyterian Meeting House) is a historic church at 304 E. Piccadilly Street in Winchester, Virginia.

The church meeting house was constructed in 1788. Upon its completion, local Presbyterians began worshipping in the building. In 1800, the Winchester Presbytery officially established the congregation as the "Presbyterian Church in Winchester." The first pastor was the Rev. Dr. William Hill. Hill was the pastor of Daniel Morgan, and gave his funeral sermon.

The church building was added to the National Register of Historic Places in 1977.
