= Handley Library =

- U.S. National Register of Historic Places
- U.S. Historic district – Contributing property
- Virginia Landmarks Register
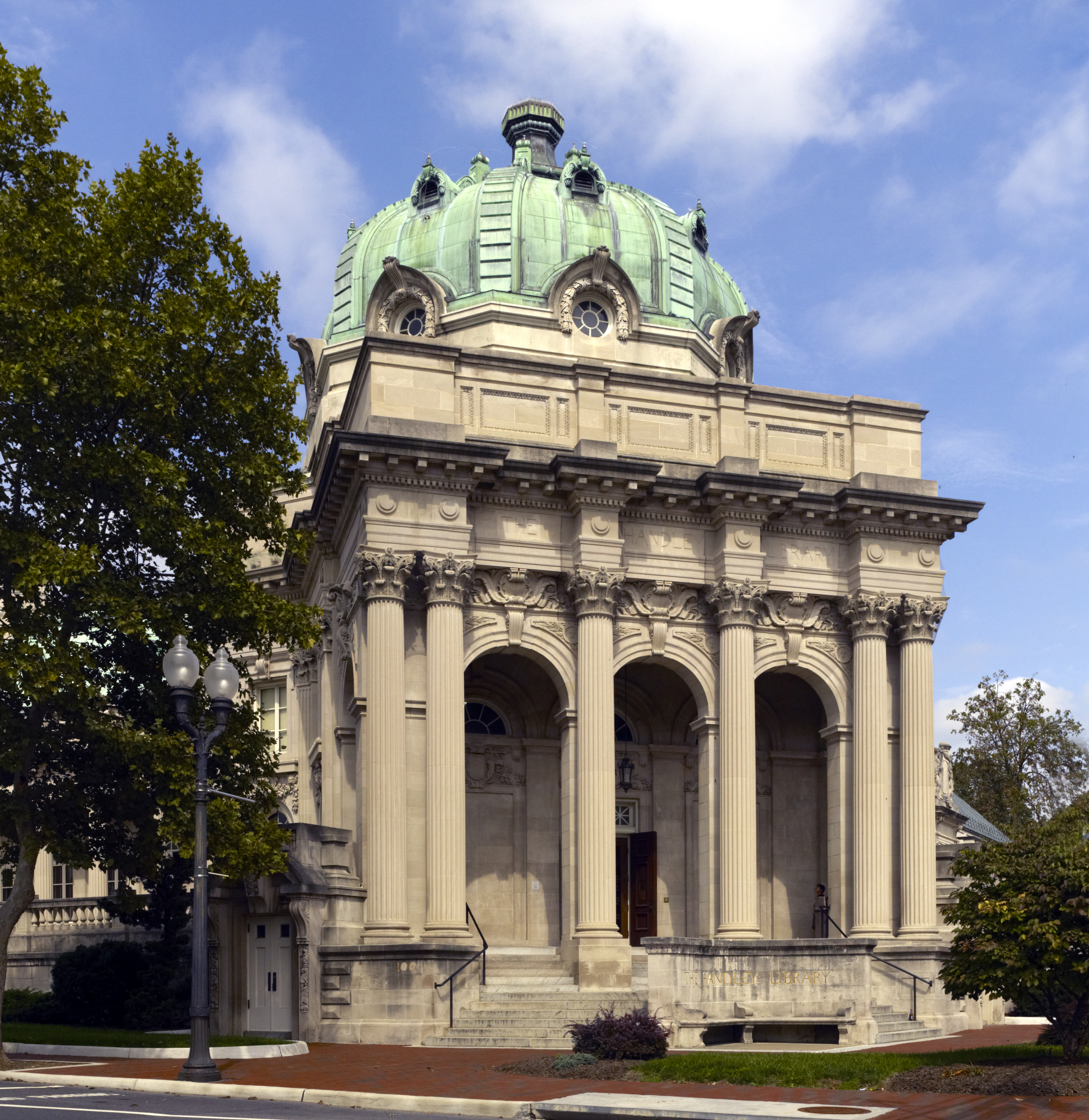
- Handley Library, September 2011

- Location within Virginia Location within the United States
- Location: 100 West Piccadilly Street Winchester, Virginia
- Coordinates: 39°11′12″N 78°10′0″W
- Area: less than one acre
- Built: 1913
- Architect: John Stewart Barney; Henry Otis Chapman
- Architectural style: Beaux Arts
- NRHP reference No.: 69000364
- VLR No.: 138-0028

Significant dates
- Added to NRHP: November 12, 1969
- Designated VLR: September 9, 1969

Handley Library is a historic library building located at 100 West Piccadilly Street in Winchester, Virginia, United States. Completed in 1913, construction of the Beaux-Arts style building was funded by a wealthy Pennsylvania businessman. The building serves as the main branch for Winchester's library system, the Handley Regional Library System. It was listed on the National Register of Historic Places (NRHP) and Virginia Landmarks Register (VLR) in 1969.

== History ==
Judge John Handley (1835–1895), an Irish-American coal magnate and lawyer from Scranton, Pennsylvania, visited Winchester several times and admired the city for its Scotch-Irish heritage. In his will, he left $250,000 for the city to erect a library "for the free use of the people of the city of Winchester" and schools for the poor. Construction of the library, designed by New York architects Barney and Chapman, was not begun until 1908. The cornerstone ceremony on May 26 was preceded by a large parade. The building's fireproof construction and facilities were considered advanced at the time of completion. The total cost of construction and furnishings was $233,230. The library opened on August 21, 1913, and originally featured a 300-seat lecture hall, study rooms and conference areas. C. Vernon Eddy was Handley's first librarian, serving in that position until 1960. Originally only white patrons were allowed to visit the library; in December 1953 city officials began allowing all residents to use the facility, regardless of race.

The library was listed on the VLR on September 9, 1969, and the NRHP on November 12, 1969. It is also designated a contributing property to the Winchester Historic District, listed on the NRHP in 1980. Architectural firm Smithey and Boynton of Roanoke designed an addition that was completed in 1979. Their work resulted in a first honor award from the American Institute of Architects. Dennis Kowal Architects of Somerville, New Jersey prepared a full historic preservation plan in 1997 and oversaw the comprehensive restoration and rehabilitation in 1999. In 2001, Dennis Kowal was awarded the Lucille Lozier Award by Preservation of Historic Winchester, Inc. for the "outstanding restoration" of the Handley Regional Library.

== Architecture ==
The Handley Library is "perhaps Virginia's purest expression of the regal and florid Beaux-Arts classicism." It was designed to resemble an open book, with the dome representing the spine and the wings representing the covers. The limestone building consists of an octagonal base and a central dome. A three-arched entrance faces the intersection of Braddock and Piccadilly Streets. Two wings flank the dome and feature single-pitched roofs with dormer lights, balustrades and Ionic colonnades. Heavy stone reliefs of figures and fruit flank several windows and doors.

== See also ==
- National Register of Historic Places listings in Winchester, Virginia
