= Winchester, Virginia =

Independent city in Virginia, United States

- Independent city
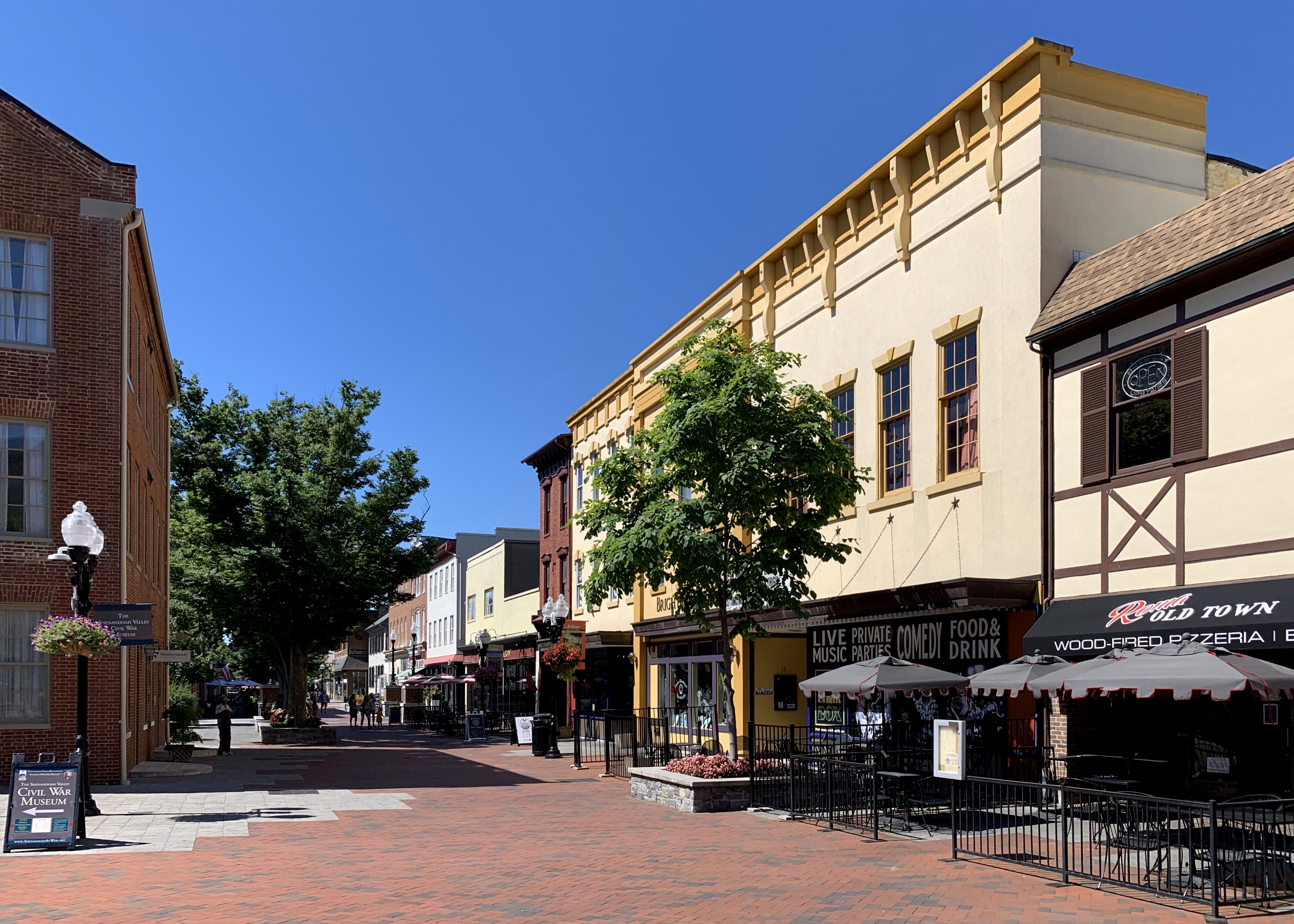
- Loudoun Street Mall in Winchester in July 2020

- Flag Seal

- Location of Winchester in Virginia

- Location of Winchester in Shenandoah Valley Winchester (Northern Virginia) Winchester (Virginia) Winchester (the United States)
- Coordinates: 39°11′N 78°10′W
- Country: United States
- State: Virginia
- County: None (Independent city)
- Founded: 1744
- Named for: Winchester, England

Government
  - Mayor: Les Veach (R)

Area
  - Total: 9.21 sq mi (23.86 km^{2})
  - Land: 9.19 sq mi (23.81 km^{2})
  - Water: 0.019 sq mi (0.05 km^{2})
- Elevation: 725 ft (221 m)

Population (2020)
  - Total: 28,120
  - Estimate (2025): 28,272 ▲
  - Density: 3,059/sq mi (1,181/km^{2})
- Time zone: UTC−5 (EST)
  - Summer (DST): UTC−4 (EDT)
- ZIP Code: 22601
- Area code: 540
- FIPS code: 51-86720
- GNIS feature ID: 1498552
- Website: winchesterva.gov

Winchester is the northernmost independent city in the Commonwealth of Virginia, United States. It is the county seat of Frederick County, although the two are separate jurisdictions. As of 2020 United States census, the city's population was 28,120. It is the principal city of the Winchester metropolitan area with a population of just over 145,000 extending into West Virginia, which is a part of the Washington–Baltimore combined statistical area. Winchester is home to Shenandoah University and the Museum of the Shenandoah Valley.

== History ==
The settlement of Winchester began as early as 1729, when Quakers such as Abraham Hollingsworth migrated up (south) the Great Valley along the long-traveled Indian Path (later called the Great Wagon Road by the colonists) from Pennsylvania. He and others began to homestead on old Shawnee campgrounds. Tradition holds that the Quakers purchased several tracts on Apple-pie Ridge from the natives, who did not disturb those settlements. The first German settler appears to have been Jost Hite in 1732, who brought ten other families, including some Scots-Irish. Though Virginia was an Anglican colony, Governor William Gooch had a tolerant policy on religion. The availability of land grants brought in many religious families, who were often given 50-acre (200,000 m^{2}) plots through the sponsorship of fellow-religious grant purchasers and speculators. As a result, the Winchester area became home to some of the oldest Presbyterian, Quaker, Lutheran and Anglican churches in the valley. The first Lutheran worship was established by Rev. John Casper Stoever Jr. and Alexander Ross established Hopewell Meeting for the Quakers. By 1736, Scots-Irish built the Opequon Presbyterian Church in Kernstown.

A legal fight erupted in 1735 when Thomas Fairfax, Sixth Lord Fairfax came to Virginia to claim his land grant. It included "all the land in Virginia between the Rappahannock and the Potomac rivers", an old grant from King Charles II which overlapped and included Frederick County. It took some time for land titles to be cleared among early settlers.

By 1738, these settlements became known as Frederick Town. The county of Frederick was carved out of Orange County. The first government was created, consisting of a County Court as well as the Anglican Frederick Parish (for purposes of tax collection). Colonel James Wood, an immigrant from Winchester, England, was the first court clerk and had been a surveyor for Orange County, Virginia. He contracted for his own home Glen Burnie homestead around 1737, and it may have been used for early government business. Wood laid out 26 half-acre (2,000 m^{2}) lots in 1744. The County Court held its first session on November 11, 1743, where James Wood served until 1760. Lord Fairfax, understanding that possession is 9/10ths of the law, built a home here (in present-day Clarke County) in 1748.

In February 1752, the Virginia House of Burgesses granted the fourth city charter in Virginia to 'Winchester' as Frederick Town was renamed after Colonel Wood's birthplace in England. In 1754, Abraham Hollingsworth built the local residence called Abram's Delight, which served as the first local Quaker meeting house. George Washington spent a good portion of his young life in Winchester helping survey the Fairfax land grant for Thomas Fairfax, Sixth Lord Fairfax, as well as performing surveying work for Colonel Wood. In 1758 Wood added 158 lots to the west side of town. In 1759 Thomas Lord Fairfax contributed 173 more lots to the south and east.

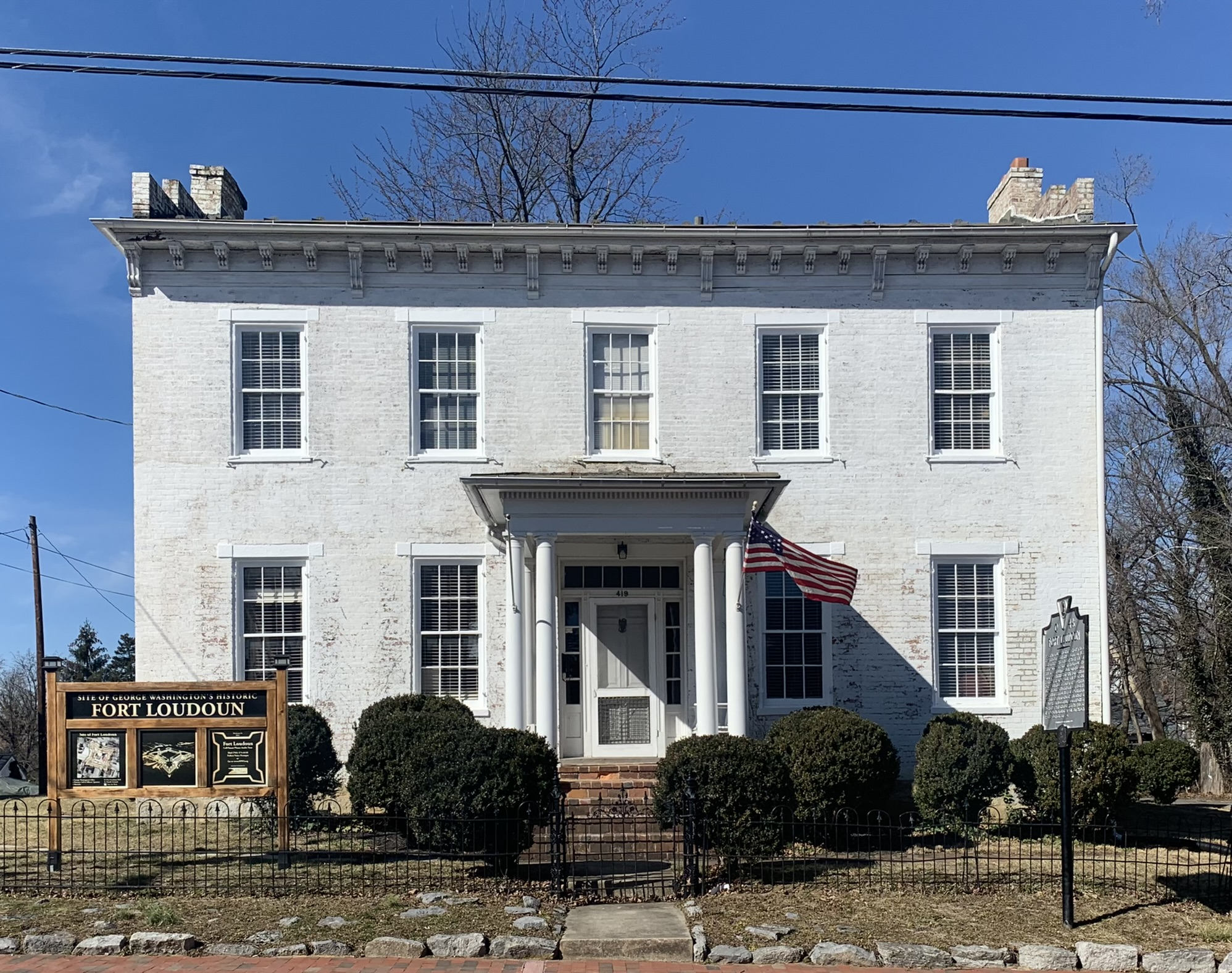
House at the site of Fort Loudoun. The fort was built between 1756 and 1758 under the supervision of George Washington.

General Edward Braddock's expeditionary march to Fort Duquesne crossed through this area in 1755 on the way to Fort Cumberland. Knowing the area well from work as a surveyor, George Washington accompanied General Braddock as his aide-de-camp. Resident Daniel Morgan joined Braddock's Army as a wagoner on its march to Pennsylvania. In 1756, on land granted by James Wood, Colonel George Washington designed and began constructing Fort Loudoun, which ultimately covered 0.955 acres (3,860 m^{2}) in present-day downtown Winchester on North Loudoun Street. Fort Loudoun was occupied and manned with guns until the start of the American Revolutionary War.

During this era, a jail was built in Winchester. It occasionally held Quakers from many parts of Virginia who protested the French and Indian War and refused to pay taxes to the Anglican parish. While their cousins in Pennsylvania dominated politics there, Virginia was an Anglican colony and did not tolerate pacifism well. The strong Quaker tradition of pacifism against strong Virginia support for this war and the next, led to long-term stifling of the Quaker population. Winchester became a gateway to Quaker settlements further west; by the mid-19th century, the Quaker population was a small minority here.

During the war in 1758, at the age of 26, Colonel George Washington was elected to represent Frederick County to the House of Burgesses. Daniel Morgan later served as a ranger protecting the borderlands of Virginia against Indian raids, returning to Winchester in 1759. Following the war, from 1763 to 1774 Daniel Morgan served in Captain Ashby's company and defended Virginia against Pontiac's Rebellion and Shawnee Indians in the Ohio valley (that part now in West Virginia).

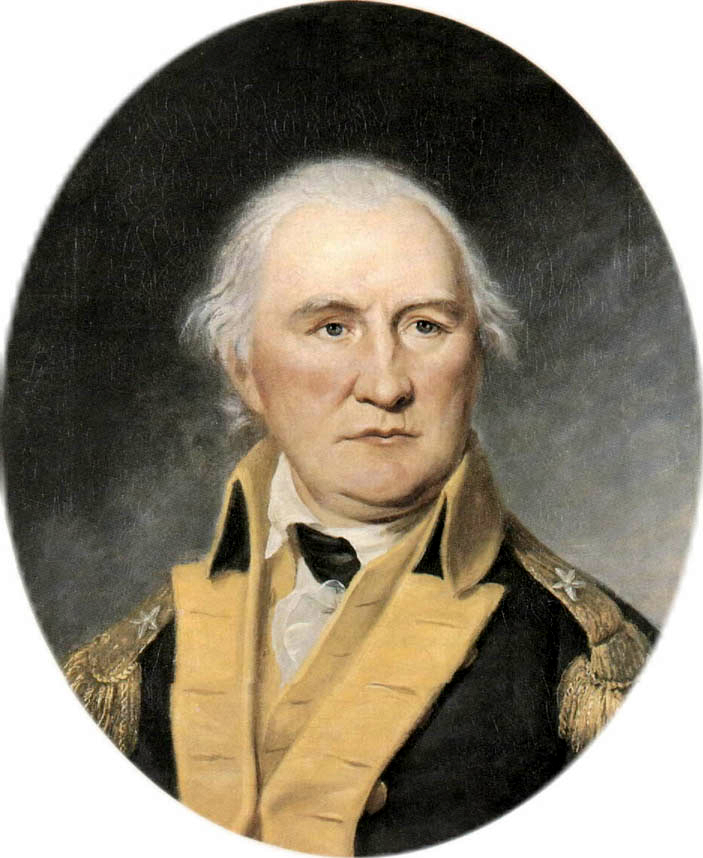
Colonel Daniel Morgan

During the American Revolutionary War, the Virginia House of Burgesses chose local resident and French and Indian War veteran Daniel Morgan to raise a company of militia to support General George Washington's efforts during the Siege of Boston. He led the 96 men of "Morgan's Sharpshooters" from Winchester on July 14, 1775, and marched to Boston in 21 days. Morgan, Wood, and others also performed duties in holding captured prisoners of war, particularly Hessian soldiers. Hessian soldiers were known to walk to the high ridge north and west of town, where they could purchase and eat apple pies made by the Quakers. The ridge became affectionately known as Apple Pie Ridge. The Ridge Road built before 1751 leading north from town was renamed Apple Pie Ridge Road. The local farmers found booming business in feeding the Virginia Militia and fledgling volunteer American army.

Following the war, the town's first newspapers, The Gazette and The Centinel, were established. Daniel Morgan continued his public service, being elected to one term in the U.S. House of Representatives (1797–1799).

=== 19th century ===
==== American Civil War ====
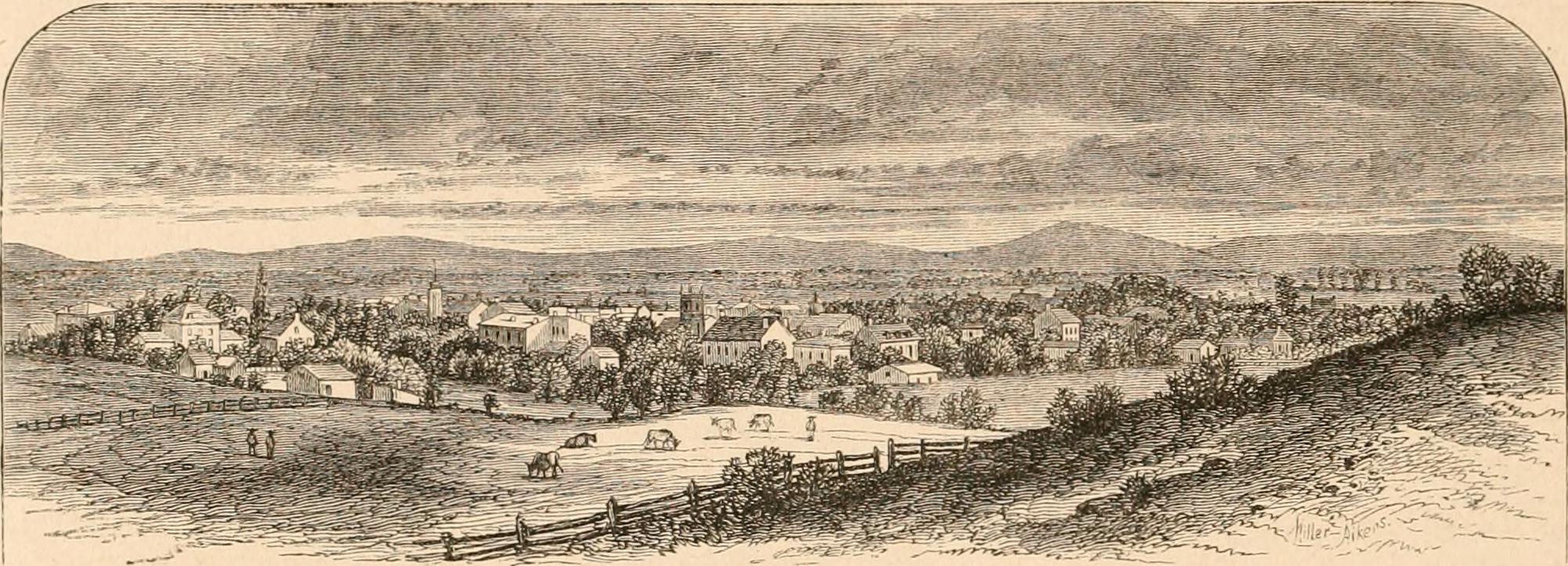
Winchester, c. 1875

Winchester and the surrounding area were the site of numerous battles during the American Civil War, as the Confederate and Union armies strove to control that portion of the Shenandoah Valley. Seven major battlefields are in the original Frederick County:

Within the city of Winchester:

- The First Battle of Kernstown, March 23, 1862
- The First Battle of Winchester, May 25, 1862
- The Second Battle of Winchester, June 13–15, 1863
- The Second Battle of Kernstown, July 24, 1864
- The Third Battle of Winchester, September 19, 1864

Near the city of Winchester:

- The Battle of Cool Spring at Snicker's Gap, July 17–18, 1864
- The Battle of Berryville, September 3–4, 1864
- The Battle of Belle Grove (or Cedar Creek), October 19, 1864

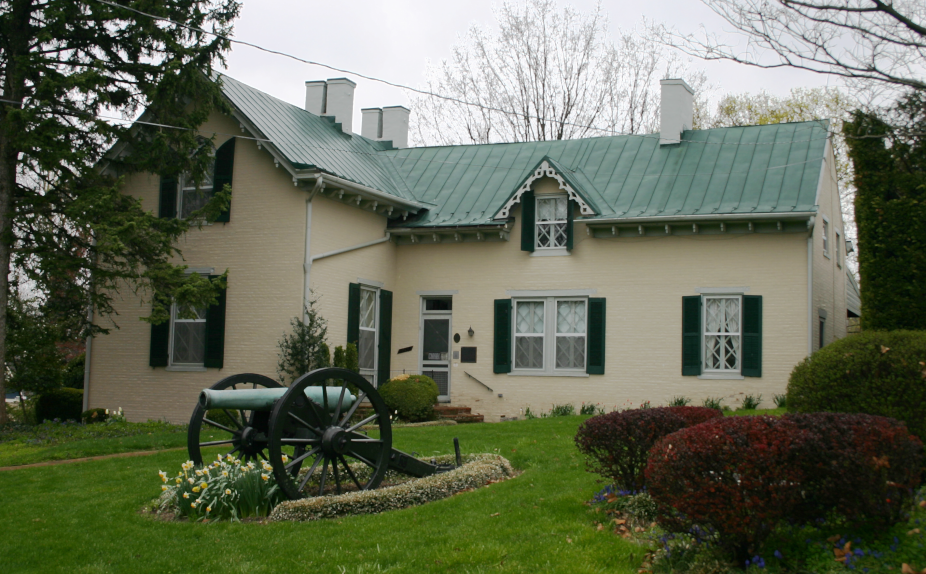
Stonewall Jackson's Headquarters Museum.

Winchester was a key strategic position for the Confederate States Army during the war. It was an important operational objective in Gen Joseph E. Johnston's and Col Thomas J. "Stonewall" Jackson's defense of the Shenandoah Valley in 1861, Jackson's Valley Campaign of 1862, the Gettysburg campaign of 1863, and the Valley Campaigns of 1864. Including minor cavalry raids and patrols, and occasional reconnaissances, historians claim that Winchester changed hands as many as 72 times and 13 times in one day. Battles raged along Main Street at points in the war. Union General Sheridan and Stonewall Jackson located their headquarters just one block apart at times.

At the north end of the lower Shenandoah Valley, Winchester was a base of operations for major Confederate invasions into the Northern United States. At times the attacks threatened the capital of Washington, D.C. The town served as a central point for troops conducting major raids against the Baltimore and Ohio Railroad, Chesapeake and Ohio Canal, and turnpike and telegraph paths along those routes and the Potomac River Valley. For instance, in 1861, Stonewall Jackson removed 56 locomotives and over 300 railroad cars, along with miles of track, from the B&O Railroad. His attack closed down the B&O's main line for ten months. Much of the effort to transport this equipment by horse and carriage centered in Winchester.

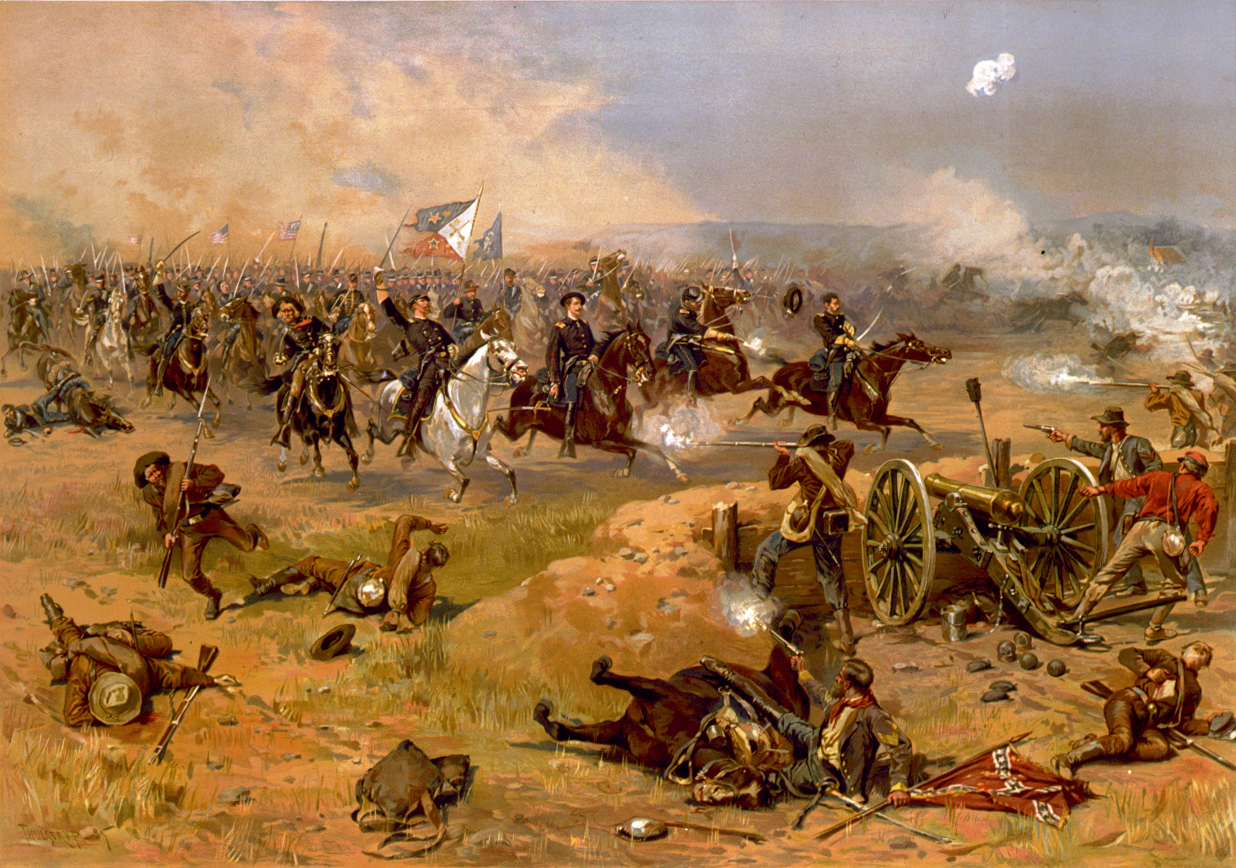
Final charge at the Third Battle of Winchester, depicted by Thure de Thulstrup, c. 1886.

During the war, Winchester was occupied by the Union Army for four major periods: by Major General Nathaniel Banks (March ? May 12 to 25, 1862, and June 4 to September 2, 1862), Major General Robert Milroy (December 24, 1862, to June 15, 1863), Major General Philip Sheridan (September 19, 1864, to February 27, 1865), and Major General Winfield Scott Hancock (February 27, 1865, to June 27, 1865). Major General Sheridan raided up the valley from Winchester, where his forces destroyed "2,000 barns filled with grain and implements, not to mention other outbuildings, 70 mills filled with wheat and flour" and "numerous head of livestock," to lessen the area's ability to supply the Confederates.

Numerous local men served with the Confederate Army, mostly as troops. Hunter McGuire was Chief Surgeon of the Second "Jackson's" Corps of the Army of Northern Virginia. He laid the foundations for the future Geneva conventions regarding the treatment of medical doctors during warfare. Winchester served as a major center for Confederate medical operations, particularly after the Battle of Sharpsburg in 1862 and the Battle of Gettysburg in 1863. Among those who took part in battles at Winchester were future U.S. presidents McKinley and Hayes, both as officers in the Union IX Corps.

The United States assigned military presence to Winchester and other parts of the South during Reconstruction after the war. Winchester was part of the First Military District, commanded by Major General John Schofield. This period lasted until January 26, 1870.

=== 20th century ===
Winchester was the first city south of the Potomac River to install electric light. In 1917 the Winchester and Western Railroad connected Winchester with Rock Enon Springs, moving both vacationers and supplies to the resort that is now Camp Rock Enon with far greater speed. Winchester is the location of the bi-annual N-SSA national competition, keeping the tradition of Civil War era firearms alive. A three-block section of downtown Loudoun Street was closed to vehicular traffic in the 1970s and is a popular pedestrian area featuring many boutiques and cafés. The street was repaved with brick and landscaped in 2013. Apple Blossom Mall opened in 1982.

In 1983, a tire dump in the area containing over seven million tires burned for nine months, polluting nearby areas with lead and arsenic. The location was cleaned up as a Superfund project between 1983 and 2002.

Winchester has been designated as a Tree City USA by the Arbor Day Foundation for over three decades.

== Geography ==
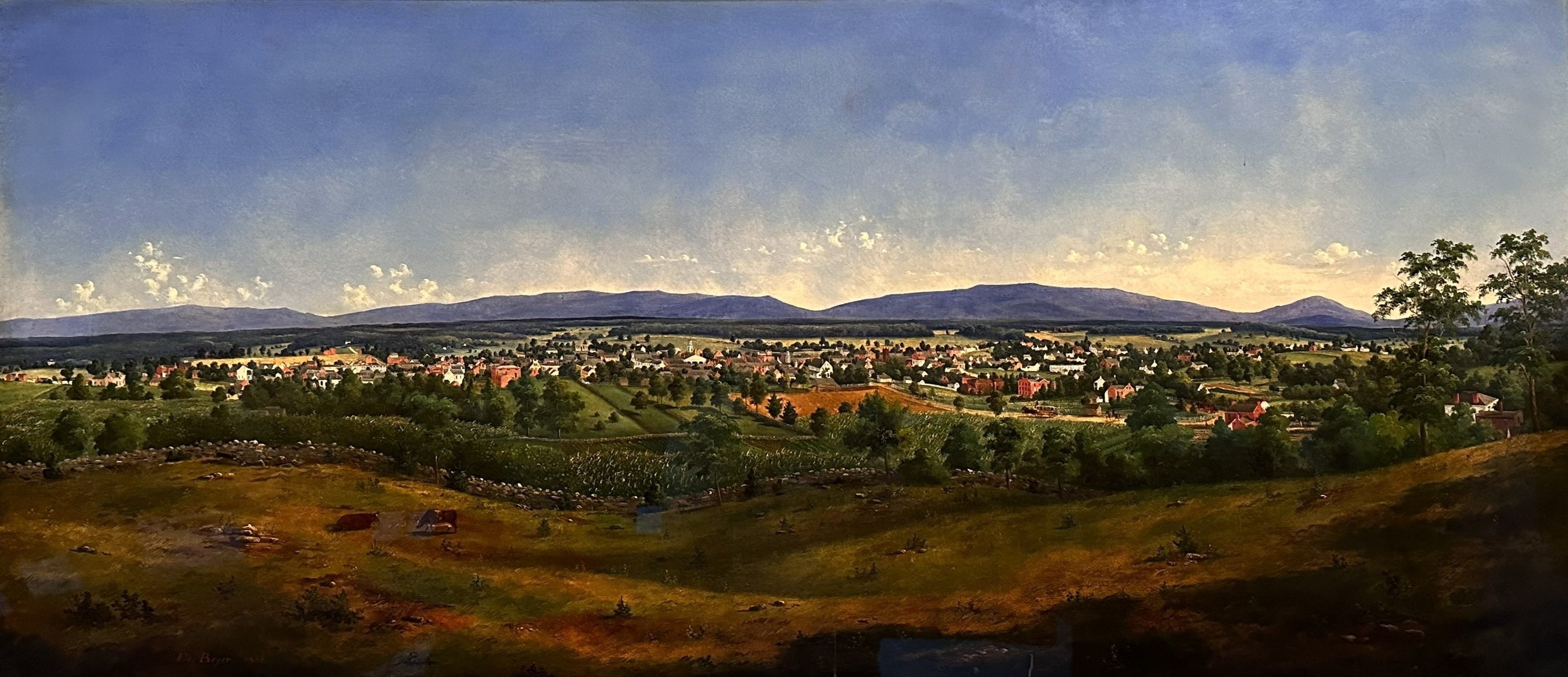
An 1856 oil painting of Winchester by Edward Beyer

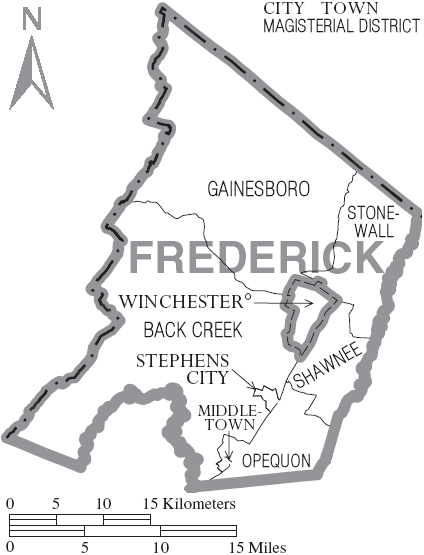
Map of Winchester, Virginia, and the surrounding Frederick County (Winchester is independent of the county but is the county seat).

Winchester is located at 39°10′41″N 78°10′01″W.

According to the United States Census Bureau, the city has a total area of 9.3 square miles (24 km^{2}), virtually all land.

It is in the Shenandoah Valley, located between the Blue Ridge Mountains and the Allegheny Mountains, and is 15 miles north-northeast of the northern peak of Massanutten Mountain. I-81 passes through the city, along with US 50, US 522, US 17, which ends in the city, and SR 7, which also ends in the city. The city is approximately 75 miles (121 km) to the west of Washington, D.C., 24 miles (39 km) south of Martinsburg, West Virginia, 25 miles (40 km) north of Front Royal, 118 miles (190 km) south of Harrisburg, Pennsylvania and 180 miles (290 km) north of Roanoke.

=== Climate ===
The climate in this area is characterized by hot, humid summers and generally mild to cool winters. According to the Köppen Climate Classification system, Winchester has depending on which isotherm is used, either a humid continental climate or a humid subtropical climate, abbreviated "Cfa" on climate maps. The hardiness zone is 6b/7a.

Climate data for Winchester, Virginia (1991–2020 normals, extremes 1912–present)
Month	Jan	Feb	Mar	Apr	May	Jun	Jul	Aug	Sep	Oct	Nov	Dec	Year
Record high °F (°C)	80 (27)	81 (27)	89 (32)	98 (37)	98 (37)	104 (40)	107 (42)	107 (42)	103 (39)	99 (37)	85 (29)	80 (27)	107 (42)
Mean daily maximum °F (°C)	42.1 (5.6)	45.4 (7.4)	53.4 (11.9)	65.6 (18.7)	74.2 (23.4)	82.6 (28.1)	87.1 (30.6)	85.5 (29.7)	78.7 (25.9)	67.4 (19.7)	56.0 (13.3)	45.7 (7.6)	65.3 (18.5)
Daily mean °F (°C)	31.6 (−0.2)	34.0 (1.1)	41.1 (5.1)	52.0 (11.1)	61.6 (16.4)	70.3 (21.3)	75.0 (23.9)	73.2 (22.9)	66.1 (18.9)	54.4 (12.4)	44.0 (6.7)	35.4 (1.9)	53.2 (11.8)
Mean daily minimum °F (°C)	21.2 (−6.0)	22.7 (−5.2)	28.8 (−1.8)	38.4 (3.6)	48.9 (9.4)	58.0 (14.4)	62.8 (17.1)	60.9 (16.1)	53.5 (11.9)	41.4 (5.2)	32.0 (0.0)	25.1 (−3.8)	41.1 (5.1)
Record low °F (°C)	−18 (−28)	−16 (−27)	−6 (−21)	12 (−11)	28 (−2)	36 (2)	42 (6)	36 (2)	30 (−1)	16 (−9)	4 (−16)	−6 (−21)	−18 (−28)
Average precipitation inches (mm)	2.48 (63)	2.23 (57)	3.43 (87)	3.22 (82)	3.94 (100)	4.04 (103)	3.82 (97)	3.66 (93)	4.39 (112)	3.05 (77)	2.89 (73)	2.81 (71)	39.96 (1,015)
Average precipitation days (≥ 0.01 in)	8.8	7.9	9.8	12.6	13.5	12.1	11.8	10.8	10.1	9.2	7.6	8.6	122.8
Source: NOAA

== Demographics ==
=== Racial and ethnic composition ===
Winchester city, Virginia – Racial and ethnic composition Note: the US Census treats Hispanic/Latino as an ethnic category. This table excludes Latinos from the racial categories and assigns them to a separate category. Hispanics/Latinos may be of any race.
Race / Ethnicity (NH = Non-Hispanic)	Pop 1980	Pop 1990	Pop 2000	Pop 2010	Pop 2020	% 1980	% 1990	% 2000	% 2010	% 2020
White alone (NH)	18,174	19,297	18,724	18,085	17,623	89.89%	87.93%	79.39%	69.02%	62.67%
Black or African American alone (NH)	1,788	2,190	2,454	2,783	2,800	8.84%	9.98%	10.40%	10.62%	9.96%
Native American or Alaska Native alone (NH)	13	26	48	37	66	0.06%	0.12%	0.20%	0.14%	0.23%
Asian alone (NH)	99	208	374	599	700	0.49%	0.95%	1.59%	2.29%	2.49%
Native Hawaiian or Pacific Islander alone (NH)	x	x	8	3	14	x	x	0.03%	0.01%	0.05%
Other race alone (NH)	29	7	36	57	135	0.14%	0.03%	0.15%	0.22%	0.48%
Mixed race or Multiracial (NH)	x	x	414	598	1,288	x	x	1.76%	2.28%	4.58%
Hispanic or Latino (any race)	114	219	1,527	4,041	5,494	0.56%	1.00%	6.47%	15.42%	19.54%
Total	20,217	21,947	23,585	26,203	28,120	100.00%	100.00%	100.00%	100.00%	100.00%

=== 2020 census ===
Historical population
Census	Pop.	Note	%±
1840	3,454		—
1850	3,857		11.7%
1860	4,392		13.9%
1870	4,477		1.9%
1880	4,958		10.7%
1890	5,196		4.8%
1900	5,161		−0.7%
1910	5,864		13.6%
1920	6,883		17.4%
1930	10,855		57.7%
1940	12,095		11.4%
1950	13,841		14.4%
1960	15,110		9.2%
1970	14,643		−3.1%
1980	20,217		38.1%
1990	21,947		8.6%
2000	23,585		7.5%
2010	26,203		11.1%
2020	28,120		7.3%
U.S. Decennial Census; 1790-1960 1900–1990; 1990-2000 2010 2020

As of the 2020 census, Winchester had a population of 28,120, and the median age was 36.7 years. 20.9% of residents were under the age of 18 and 16.7% of residents were 65 years of age or older; for every 100 females there were 97.1 males, and for every 100 females age 18 and over there were 94.5 males age 18 and over.

As of the 2020 census, 100.0% of residents lived in urban areas, while 0.0% lived in rural areas.

There were 11,404 households in Winchester, of which 28.0% had children under the age of 18 living in them. Of all households, 36.3% were married-couple households, 22.9% were households with a male householder and no spouse or partner present, and 31.8% were households with a female householder and no spouse or partner present. About 34.4% of all households were made up of individuals and 13.3% had someone living alone who was 65 years of age or older.

There were 12,372 housing units, of which 7.8% were vacant. The homeowner vacancy rate was 2.0% and the rental vacancy rate was 5.7%.

Racial composition as of the 2020 census
Race	Number	Percent
White	18,336	65.2%
Black or African American	2,865	10.2%
American Indian and Alaska Native	255	0.9%
Asian	711	2.5%
Native Hawaiian and Other Pacific Islander	16	0.1%
Some other race	3,536	12.6%
Two or more races	2,401	8.5%
Hispanic or Latino (of any race)	5,494	19.5%

== Economy ==
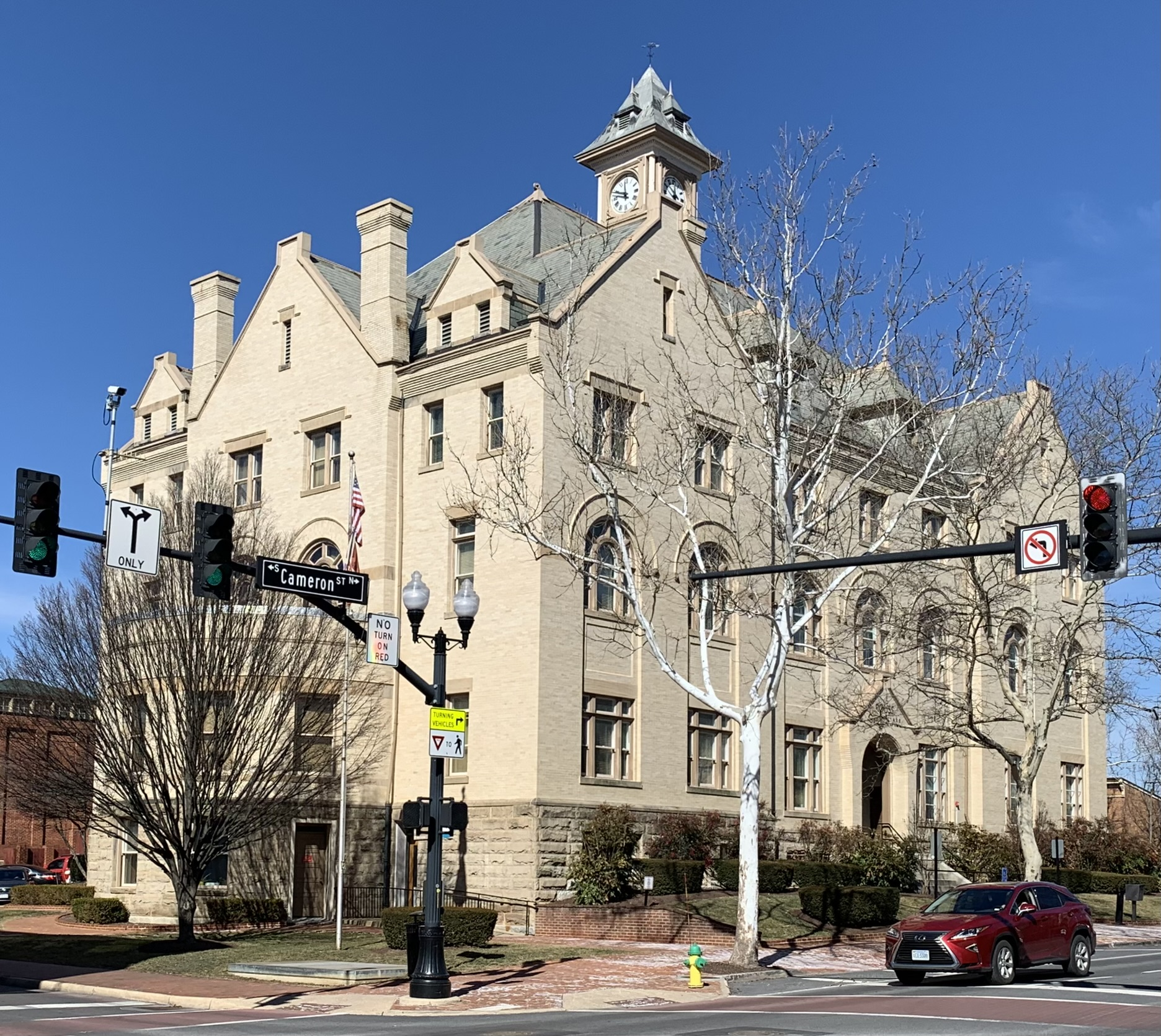
Winchester City Hall, February 2022

Companies based in Winchester include American Woodmark, Trex, and Rubbermaid Commercial Products. Federal agencies with operations in Winchester include the Federal Emergency Management Agency, the Federal Bureau of Investigation, and the United States Army Corps of Engineers.

According to the City's 2024 Comprehensive Annual Financial Report, the top employers in the city are:

#	Employer	# of Employees
1	Valley Health	1,000 and over
2	Walmart	1,000 and over
3	Frederick County, Virginia	1,000 and over
4	City of Winchester	500–999
5	Rubbermaid	500–999
6	Federal Bureau of Investigation	500–999
7	Winchester Public Schools (Virginia)	500–999
8	Shenandoah University	500–999
9	United States Department of Defense	250–499
10	Blue Ridge Hospice	250–499

=== Record manufacturing ===
Winchester was home to Capitol Records' East Coast Pressing Plant. Capitol Records Distribution Corporation announced in 1968 the purchasing of land in Winchester, Va for a new record processing plant. Along with this plant they built several houses, bought a few small businesses and later built a tape production plant. The Winchester plant began construction in 1968 and production in 1969. The plant initially had a workforce of 250 people. This plant complemented the other existing manufacturing facilities of Capitol Records in Scranton, Pennsylvania, Jacksonville, Florida and Los Angeles, California. In 1969 Capitol Records' Pressing Plant in Scranton began phasing out its vinyl manufacturing in favor of the new Winchester plant. Records pressed here include Talking Heads' Remain in Light, Dead Boys' Young, Loud and Snotty, and Yoko Ono's Fly. Capitol Records announced in late 1987 that it would end tape duplicating production in the US, in favor of offshore manufacturing, including in Winchester by early 1988, putting more than 500 employees out of work when they closed the Winchester plant.

== Arts and culture ==
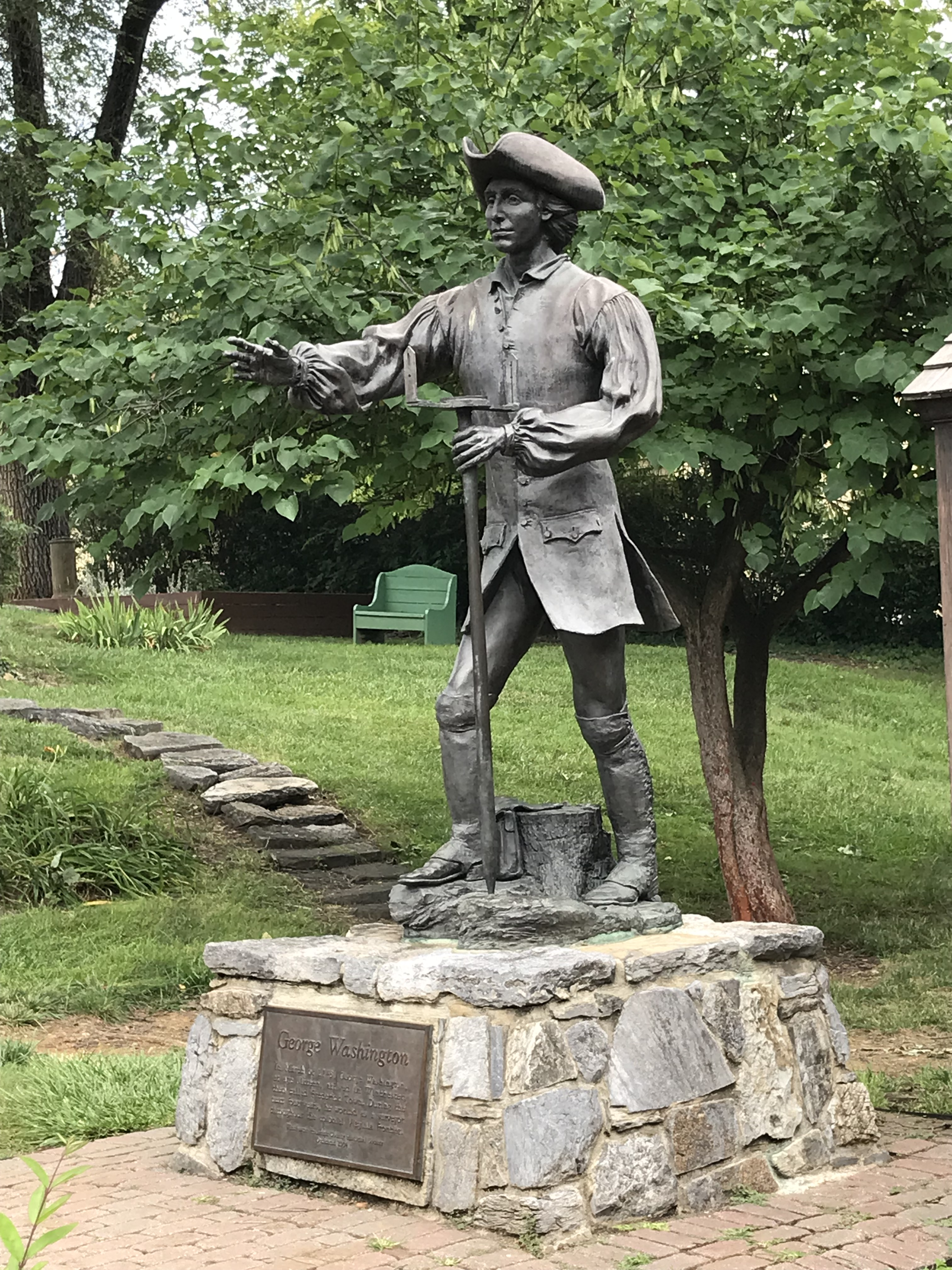
Statue of George Washington at George Washington's Office Museum.

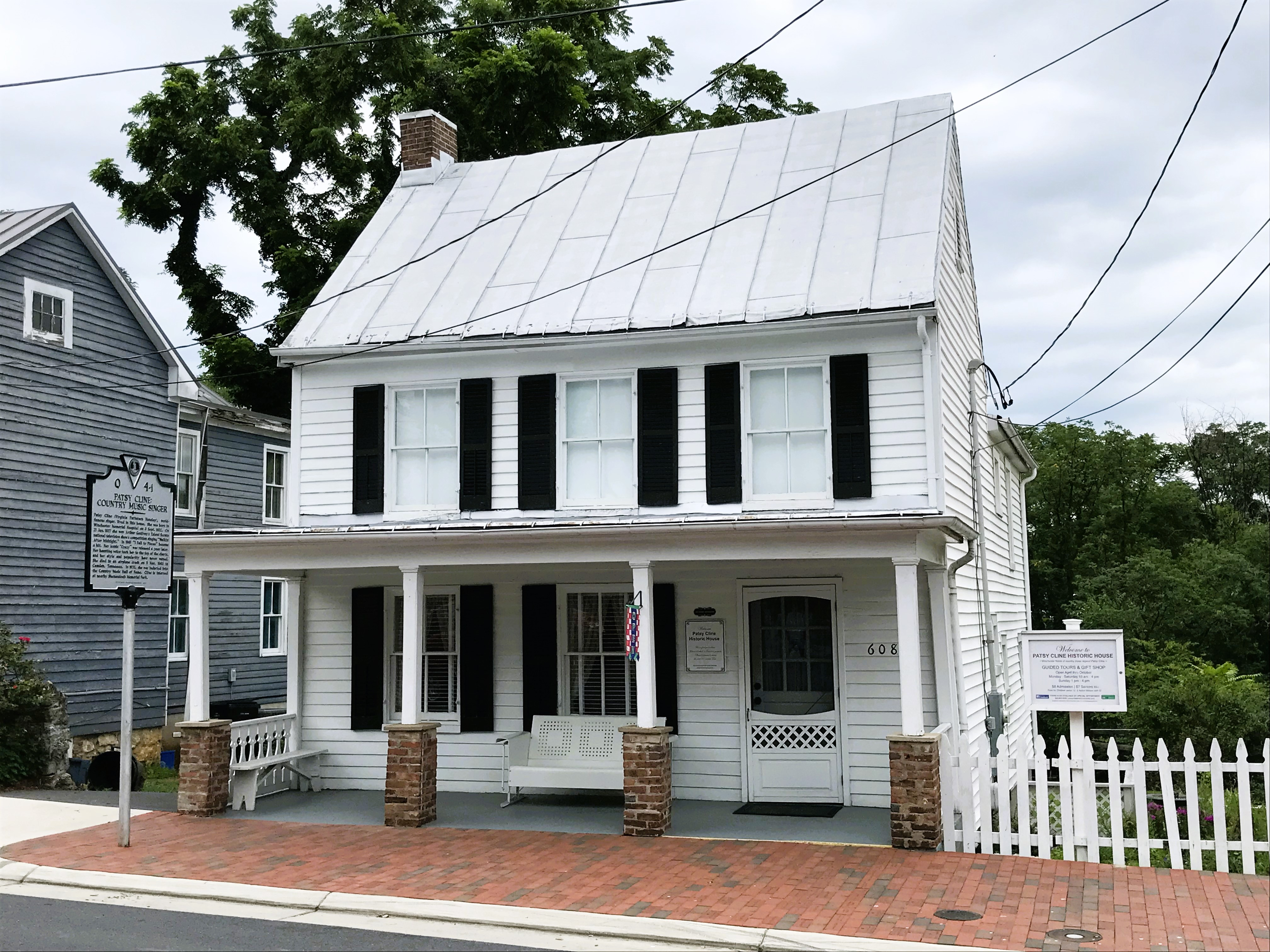
Patsy Cline House, home of country music star Patsy Cline from 1948 to 1953.

=== Historic sites ===
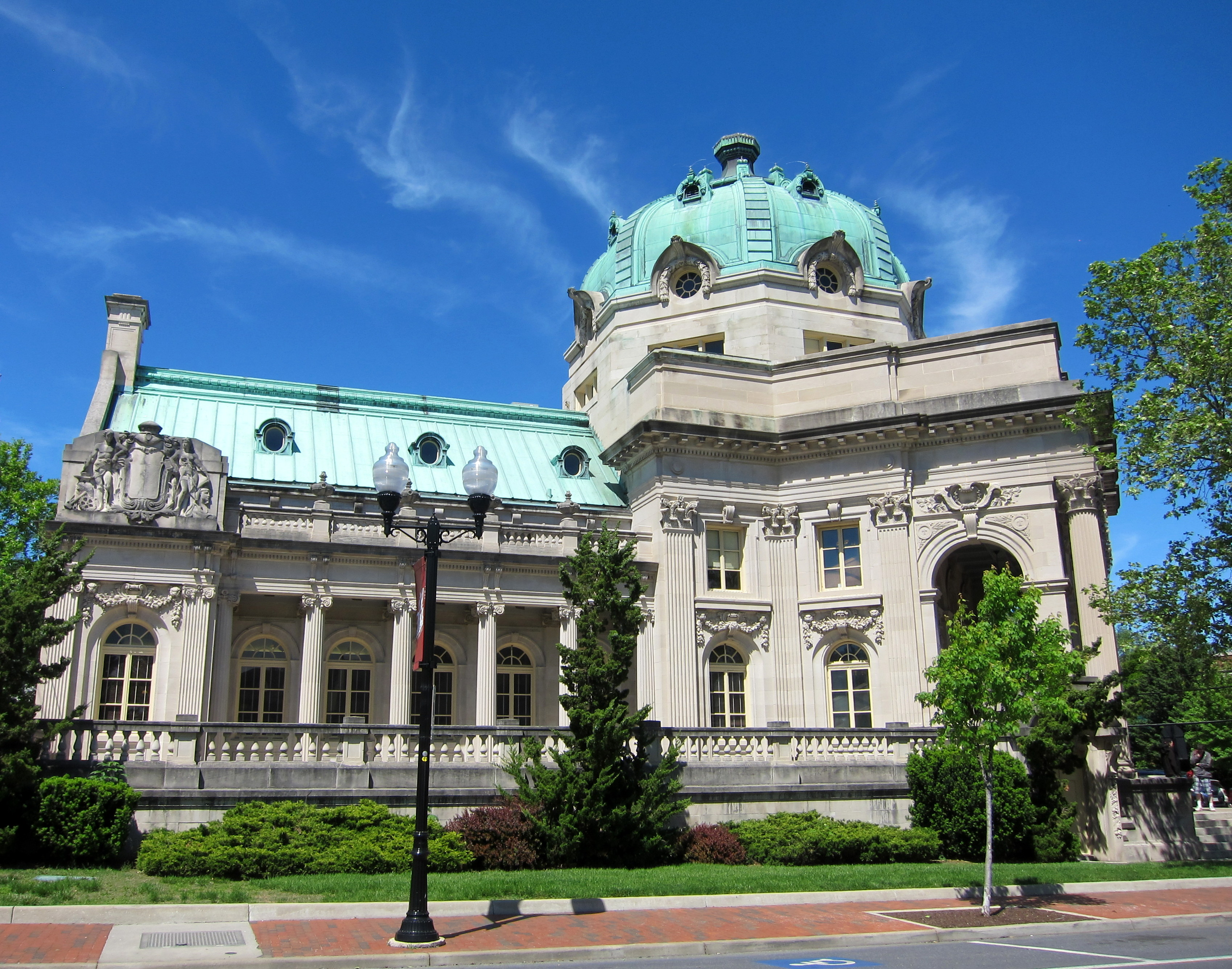
Handley Library.

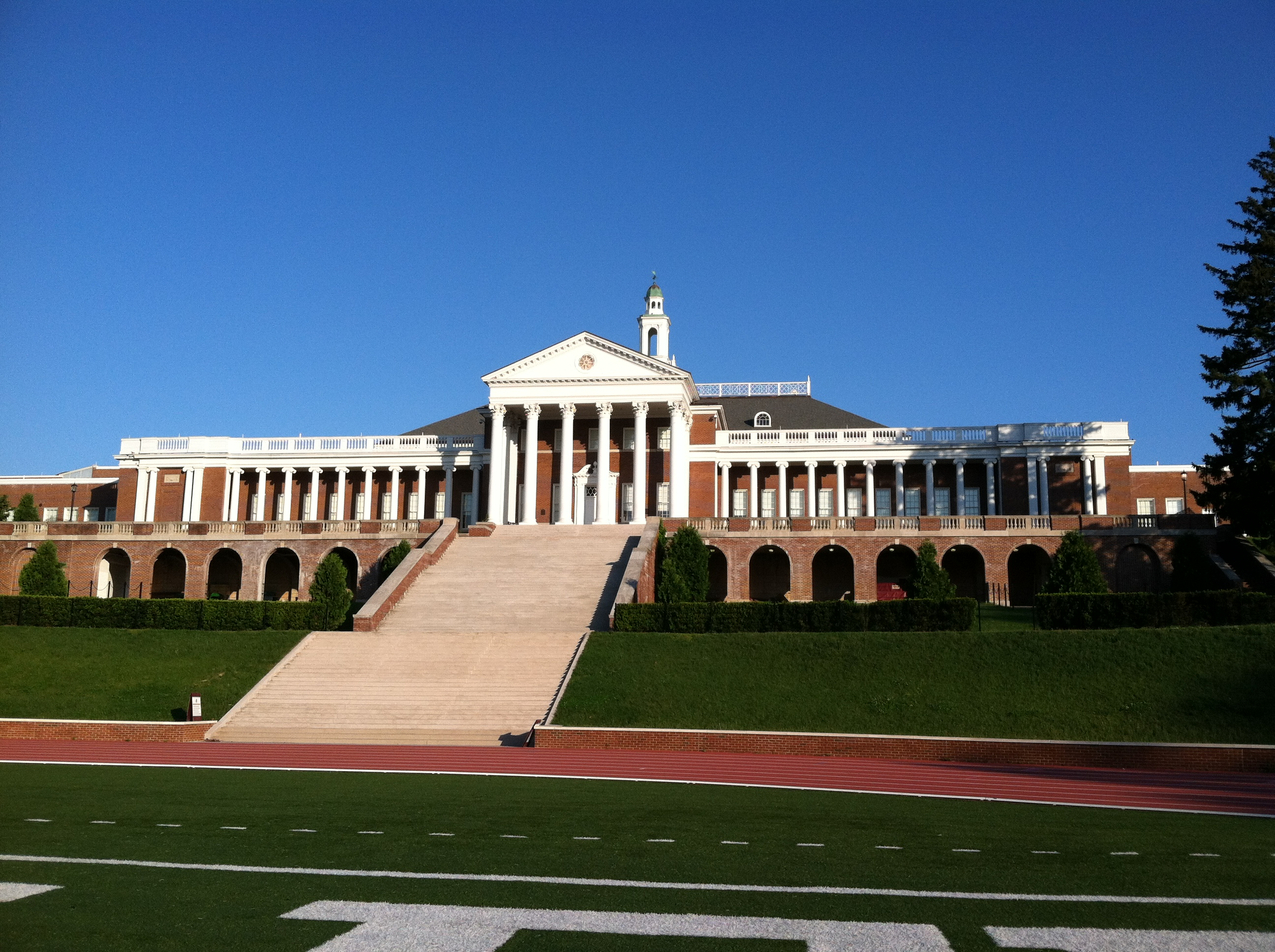
John Handley High School.

Site	Year built	Address	Listed
Abram's Delight	1754	Parkview Street & Rouss Spring Road	1973
Douglas School	1927	598 North Kent Street	2000
Fair Mount	19th century	311 Fairmont Avenue	2004
Glen Burnie	1794	901 Amherst Street	1979
Handley Library	1913	Braddock & Piccadilly Streets	1969
John Handley High School	1920s	425 Handley Boulevard	1998
Hawthorne and Old Town Spring	1811	610 and 730 Amherst Street	2013
Hexagon House	1870s	530 Amherst Street	1987
Stonewall Jackson's Headquarters Museum	mid-19th century	415 North Braddock Street	1967
Adam Kurtz House	1757	Braddock & Cork Streets	1976
Old Stone Church (Winchester, Virginia)	1788	304 East Piccadilly Street	1977
Triangle Diner	1948	27 West Gerrard Street	2010
Winchester Historic District	1750–1930	US 522, US 11 & US 50/US 17	1980
Winchester Historic District (Boundary Increase)		120 & 126 North Kent Street	2003
Winchester National Cemetery	1860s	401 National Avenue	1996
George Washington's Office Museum	by 1748	32 West Cork Street	1975
Patsy Cline Historic House	1880	608 S. Kent St.	2005
Mount Hebron Cemetery and Stonewall Confederate Cemetery	1844	305 E. Boscawen Street	2008
The George Washington Hotel	1924	103 E Piccadilly Street	2010

=== Shenandoah Apple Blossom Festival ===
Winchester is the location of the annual Shenandoah Apple Blossom Festival, which has existed since 1924. It is usually held during the first weekend in May. The festival includes a carnival, firework show, parades, several dances and parties, and a coronation where the Apple Blossom Queen is crowned. Local school systems and many businesses close the Friday of Apple Blossom weekend.

Winchester has more than 20 different "artistic" apples that are made of various materials including wood, rubber pipe, plaster, and paint. These apples were created in 2005 by occupants of the city and were placed at a specific location at the artists' request after being auctioned off. For example, a bright red apple with a large stethoscope attached to it was placed beside a much-used entrance to the Winchester Medical Center.

== Sports ==
Winchester is home to the Winchester Royals, which is part of the Valley Baseball League, a National Collegiate Athletic Association-sanctioned collegiate summer baseball league in the Shenandoah Valley of Virginia.

Shenandoah University is located in Winchester and has numerous male and female sports in the Old Dominion Athletic Conference. Winchester is also home to the Winchester Speedway, a 3/8-mile clay oval track, which plays host to a number of touring series, such as the World of Outlaws Late Model Series, and the Lucas Oil Late Model Dirt Series.

== Government and politics ==
Winchester had long favored Republican candidates through the second half of the 20th Century. However, in 2008 the city swung strongly into the Democratic column to support Barack Obama. Even though Obama lost ground in 2012 and only carried the city by 148 votes, it has nevertheless stayed Democratic-leaning ever since. In 2020, Joe Biden won the city with the highest percentage for a Democrat since 1936.

United States presidential election results for Winchester, Virginia
Year	Republican		Democratic		Third party(ies)	
Year	No.	%	No.	%	No.	%
1880	392	41.35%	556	58.65%	0	0.00%
1884	551	53.86%	472	46.14%	0	0.00%
1888	540	51.82%	488	46.83%	14	1.34%
1892	468	43.66%	579	54.01%	25	2.33%
1896	447	45.33%	490	49.70%	49	4.97%
1900	423	41.19%	593	57.74%	11	1.07%
1904	146	26.40%	394	71.25%	13	2.35%
1908	266	35.75%	449	60.35%	29	3.90%
1912	141	20.83%	447	66.03%	89	13.15%
1916	196	28.65%	468	68.42%	20	2.92%
1920	540	41.54%	736	56.62%	24	1.85%
1924	420	33.39%	820	65.18%	18	1.43%
1928	1,168	59.53%	794	40.47%	0	0.00%
1932	698	36.54%	1,179	61.73%	33	1.73%
1936	743	40.14%	1,096	59.21%	12	0.65%
1940	945	45.72%	1,114	53.89%	8	0.39%
1944	1,095	52.09%	1,000	47.57%	7	0.33%
1948	1,272	49.96%	894	35.11%	380	14.93%
1952	2,375	69.20%	1,055	30.74%	2	0.06%
1956	2,375	69.46%	945	27.64%	99	2.90%
1960	2,326	65.61%	1,203	33.94%	16	0.45%
1964	2,180	49.13%	2,254	50.80%	3	0.07%
1968	2,695	55.76%	1,360	28.14%	778	16.10%
1972	4,647	75.55%	1,418	23.05%	86	1.40%
1976	4,075	62.85%	2,346	36.18%	63	0.97%
1980	4,240	64.02%	2,006	30.29%	377	5.69%
1984	5,055	70.68%	2,064	28.86%	33	0.46%
1988	4,497	65.53%	2,300	33.52%	65	0.95%
1992	3,833	49.77%	2,768	35.94%	1,100	14.28%
1996	3,681	50.97%	3,027	41.91%	514	7.12%
2000	4,314	54.70%	3,318	42.07%	254	3.22%
2004	5,283	56.55%	3,967	42.46%	93	1.00%
2008	4,725	46.66%	5,268	52.02%	133	1.31%
2012	4,946	48.04%	5,094	49.48%	256	2.49%
2016	4,790	44.90%	5,164	48.41%	713	6.68%
2020	5,221	43.13%	6,610	54.60%	275	2.27%
2024	5,252	44.16%	6,407	53.87%	235	1.98%

=== City council ===
Winchester's follows a Council-Manager form of government. It is governed by the Common Council, an elected body within a ward system. The city is composed of four wards, each with 2 councilmen, with the city's mayor serving as the ninth representative and leader of the council. While the council began as a 13-member board, it transitioned from 13 to 9, beginning in 2006 and ending in 2008.

- Mayor: Les Veach (R)
- Ward 1: Chip Newcom (D), Richard Bell (D)
- Ward 2: Emily Windle (R), Terry Sloane (I)
- Ward 3: Kim Herbstritt (D), Corey Sullivan (R)
- Ward 4: Kathy Tagnesi (R), John Fox (R)

== Education ==
Winchester Public Schools operates public schools, including John Handley High School.

== Transportation ==
=== Highways ===
The most prominent highway serving Winchester is Interstate 81, with Winchester located roughly halfway between its northernmost and southernmost ends. I-81 extends northeast to southwest, beginning on the New York side of the Thousands Island National Park in Ontario. From here, the highway continues through upstate New York into northeastern Pennsylvania, where it passes through central and southern Pennsylvania into western Maryland. From here, it passes through a small portion of eastern West Virginia, all of Virginia, from Winchester, Virginia's northernmost city, through central and southern Virginia. After Virginia, the highway finally passes through the short border with eastern Tennessee. The highway terminates shortly after this.

Other highways passing through Winchester include U.S. Route 11, U.S. Route 17, U.S. Route 50 and U.S. Route 522. These four highways follow city streets through downtown Winchester, with U.S. Route 17 coming to its northern terminus. Virginia State Route 7 also serves Winchester, terminating in downtown. Virginia State Route 37 bypasses the city to the west.

=== Public transportation ===
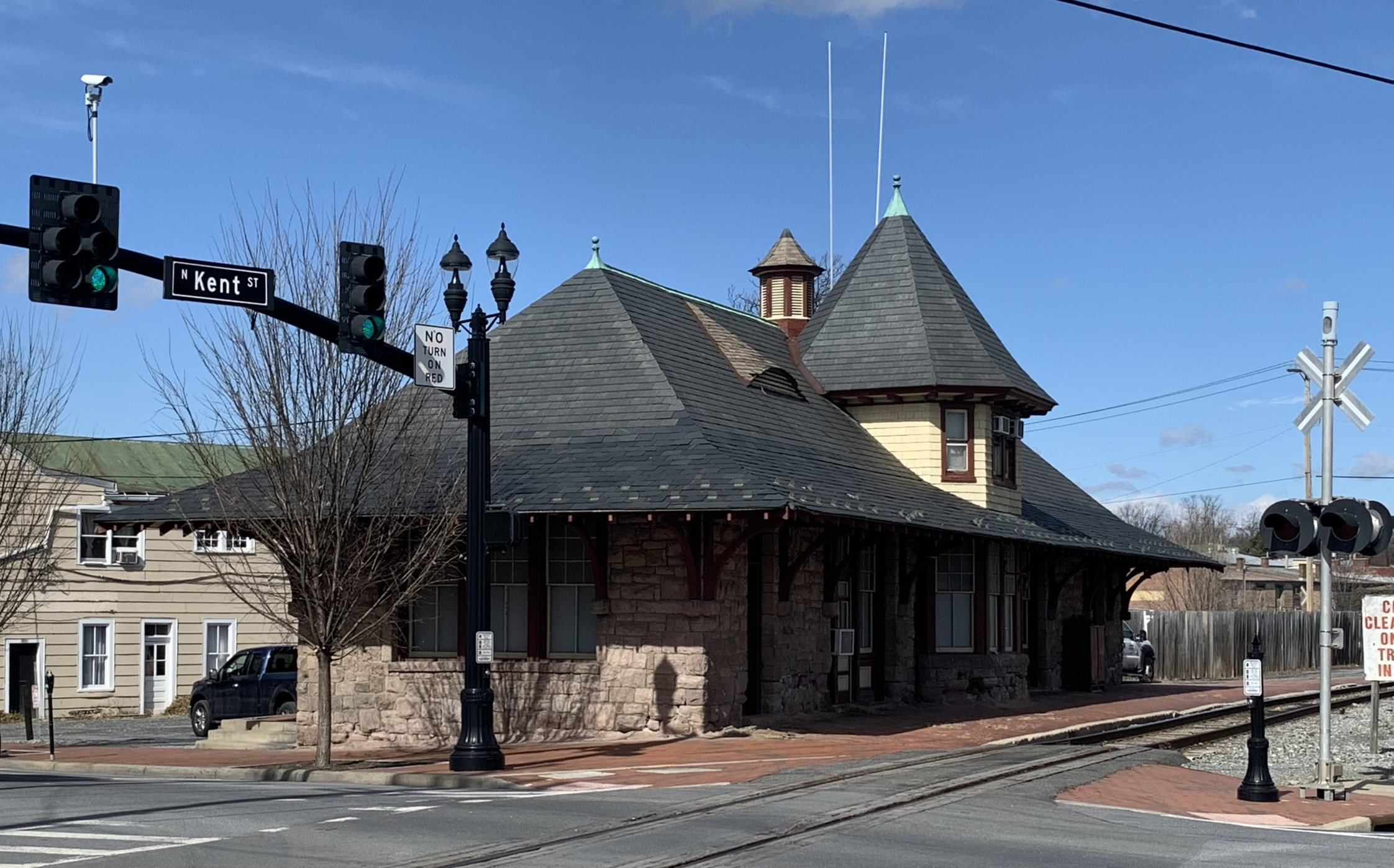
Winchester and Western Railroad station

Winchester Transit operates on-demand transit and two fixed bus routes in the city of Winchester.

The Potomac Valley Transit Authority also serves Winchester, including to the Trex complex.

=== Airports ===
Winchester Regional Airport provides general aviation and air taxi service to the area.

== Notable people ==
=== 18th century ===
- John H. Aulick (1787–1873), United States Navy officer and veteran of the War of 1812
- Briscoe Baldwin (1789–1852), Virginia delegate and member of the Constitutional Convention
- Rebecca Boone (1739–1813), pioneer and wife of frontiersman Daniel Boone
- Jane Frazier (1735–1815), frontier woman
- Daniel Morgan (1735–1802), major general of Virginia militia in Revolutionary War; buried at Mount Hebron cemetery
- Presley Neville (1756–1818), general, Revolutionary War aide-de-camp to the Marquis de Lafayette and Chief Burgess of the Borough of Pittsburgh
- Francis White (–1826), U.S. Representative
- James Wood (1741–1813), brigadier general, Governor of Virginia, son of Winchester's founder

=== 19th century ===
- Robert T. Barton (1842–1917), Virginia Delegate, Mayor of Winchester and Confederate veteran of the American Civil War
- Frances Courtenay Baylor (1848–1920), American novelist
- Rear Admiral Richard E. Byrd (1888–1957), pioneering polar explorer
- John Snyder Carlile (1817–1878), U.S. Senator, instrumental in the creation of West Virginia*U.S. Solicitor General
- Charles Magill Conrad (1804–1878), Secretary of War under President Millard Fillmore
- Holmes Conrad (1840–1915), United States Assistant Attorney General and Solicitor General of the United States under President Grover Cleveland and Confederate cavalry Major in the American Civil War
- James William Denver (1817–1892), briefly a Brigadier General in the Union Army during the American Civil War, and for whom the city of Denver, Colorado, was named
- Helen H. Gardener (1853–1925), rationalist orator and novelist
- Frederick W. M. Holliday (1828–1899), colonel of 33rd Virginia Regiment, Provisional Army of the Confederate States, member of the Confederate Congress during the American Civil War and the Governor of Virginia from 1878 to 1882.
- George Hay Lee (1808–1873), United States judge
- Mary Greenhow Lee (1819–1907), diarist during the Civil War.
- James M. Mason, U.S. Senator
- Cornelia Peake McDonald (1822–1909), diarist during the Civil War
- Hunter McGuire, M.D. (1835–1900), Chief Surgeon of the Second "Jackson's" Corps of the Army of Northern Virginia. President of the American Medical Association.
- Admiral Louis M. Nulton (1869–1954), superintendent of the U.S. Naval Academy (1925–1928) and Commander Battle Fleet (1929–1930).
- Sara Winifred Brown (1868–1948), African American professor and doctor of gynecology. Founded the National Association of University Women, and was the first woman to serve as an alumni trustee of Howard University.
- Spot Poles (1887–1962), accomplished baseball player in the precursor to the Negro leagues
- James Innes Randolph (1837–1887), Confederate Army officer, lawyer, and poet
- Heyward Shepherd (†1859), Black baggage porter on the Baltimore and Ohio Railroad, first person killed during John Brown's raid on Harpers Ferry. There is a monument to him in Harpers Ferry.
- John Randolph Tucker (1823–1897), U.S. Representative from Virginia
- Josiah T. Walls (1842–1905), first African-American U.S. congressman from Florida
- Charles Franklin Moss (1878–1961), photographer and artist

=== 20th century ===
- Anne Tucker McGuire (1913–1988) was an American-born actress who appeared largely in British films and television
- Joe Bageant (1946–2011), writer and journalist
- Brian Benben (1956–), actor
- Harry F. Byrd Jr. (1914–2013), politician and U.S. Senator
- Lang Campbell (1981–), professional football quarterback
- Patsy Cline (1932–1963), country/pop vocalist and music icon, born in Winchester, interred at Shenandoah Memorial Park.
- Doug Creek (1969–2024), professional baseball player
- Claude Dallas (1950–), self-styled mountain man convicted of voluntary manslaughter in the deaths of two game wardens in Idaho.
- Penny DeHaven (1948–2014), country music singer
- John Gilkerson (1985–), professional soccer player
- Erick Green (1991–), professional basketball player
- Jack Holt (1888–1951), actor
- John Kirby (1908–1952), jazz musician
- Mark McFarland (1978–), NASCAR driver
- Devon McTavish (1984–), professional soccer player with D.C. United
- J. Kenneth Robinson (1916–1990), U.S. Representative
- Rick Santorum (1958–), presidential candidate, former U.S. senator
- Henry H. Whiting (1923–2012), Justice of the Supreme Court of Virginia
- Emma Howard Wight (1863–1935), author
- James "Clayster" Eubanks (1992–), professional Call of Duty player

== Sister cities ==
- Ambato, Ecuador
- Winchester, United Kingdom

Winchester's first sister city, Winchester, England, is where the Virginia town gets its name. During the Eisenhower administration, Winchester also formalized a sister city relationship with Ambato, Ecuador.

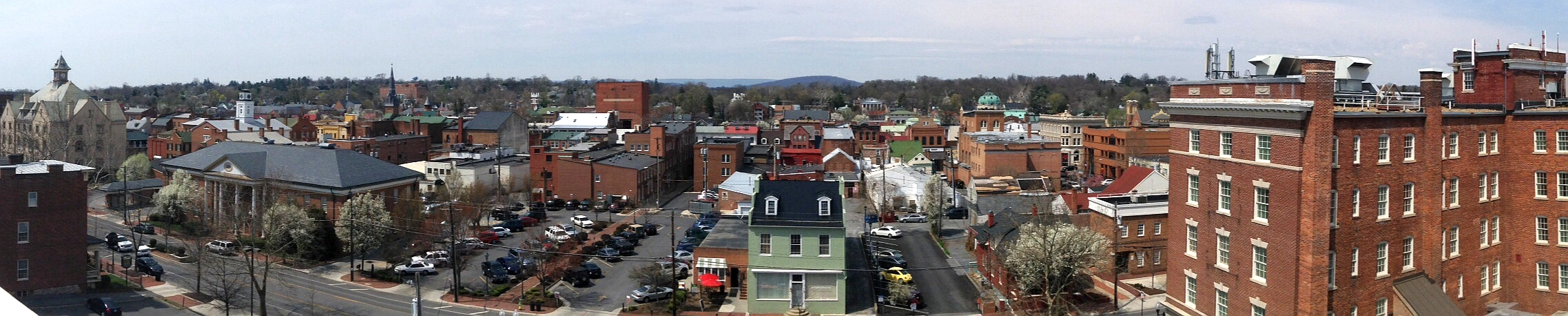
A panoramic view of old town Winchester
