= Winchester Historic District (Winchester, Virginia) =

Historic district in Virginia, United States

- U.S. National Register of Historic Places
- U.S. Historic district
- Virginia Landmarks Register
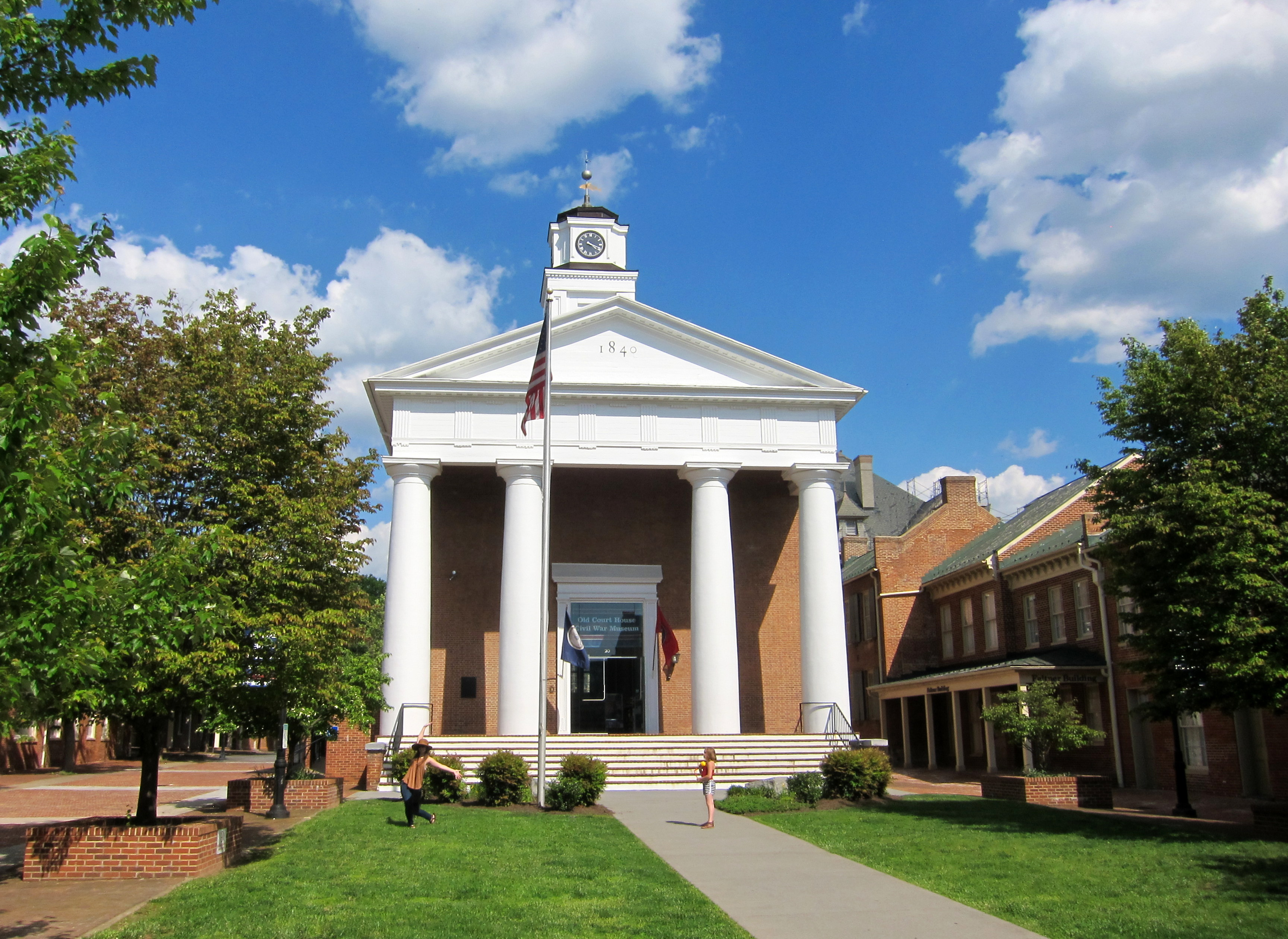
- Old Courthouse, May 2016

- Location within Virginia Location within the United States
- Location: U.S. 522, U.S. 11 and U.S. 50/17; 120 and 126 N. Kend St.; 300-400 blocks of N. Cameron St., 12 Clark St., 110 E. Fairfax La. and 145 N. Baker St., Winchester, Virginia
- Coordinates: 39°11′2″N 78°10′00″W
- Area: 236.5 acres (95.7 ha)
- Built: c. 1750
- Architect: Multiple
- Architectural style: Late 19th And 20th Century Revivals, Mid 19th Century Revival, Late Victorian, Italianate, Early Commercial
- NRHP reference No.: 80004318 (original); 03000054 (increase 1); 08000874 (increase 2); 15000963 (increase 3)
- VLR No.: 138-0042

Significant dates
- Added to NRHP: March 4, 1980
- Boundary increases: February 20, 2003; September 12, 2008; January 5, 2016
- Designated VLR: April 17, 1979, December 4, 2002, June 19, 2008

The Winchester Historic District is a national historic district located at Winchester, Virginia. The district encompasses 1,116 contributing buildings in Winchester. The buildings represent a variety of popular architectural styles including Late Victorian and Italianate. They include residential, commercial, governmental, industrial, and institutional buildings dating from the 18th to mid-20th centuries. Notable buildings include the A.M.E Church (1878), Masonic Lodge and Gray and Eddy Building, First Presbyterian Church (1841, 1883), Farmers and Merchants Bank (1902), Frederick County Courthouse (1840), Grace Lutheran Church (1841, 1875), Friendship Fire Hall (1892), John Kerr School (1883, 1908), City Hall (1900), Lewis Jones Knitting Mill (1895), Tidball Residence (c. 1835), William F. Hottle Residence (c. 1880), McGuire Residence (c. 1820), and Robert Long House (c. 1930). Located in the district are the separately listed Thomas J. Jackson Headquarters, Fair Mount, Handley Library, Adam Kurtz House, and Daniel Morgan House.

It was listed on the National Register of Historic Places in 1980, with boundary increases in 2003, 2008, and 2016.
