= Fair Mount =

Historic house in Virginia, United States

- U.S. National Register of Historic Places
- U.S. Historic district – Contributing property
- Virginia Landmarks Register
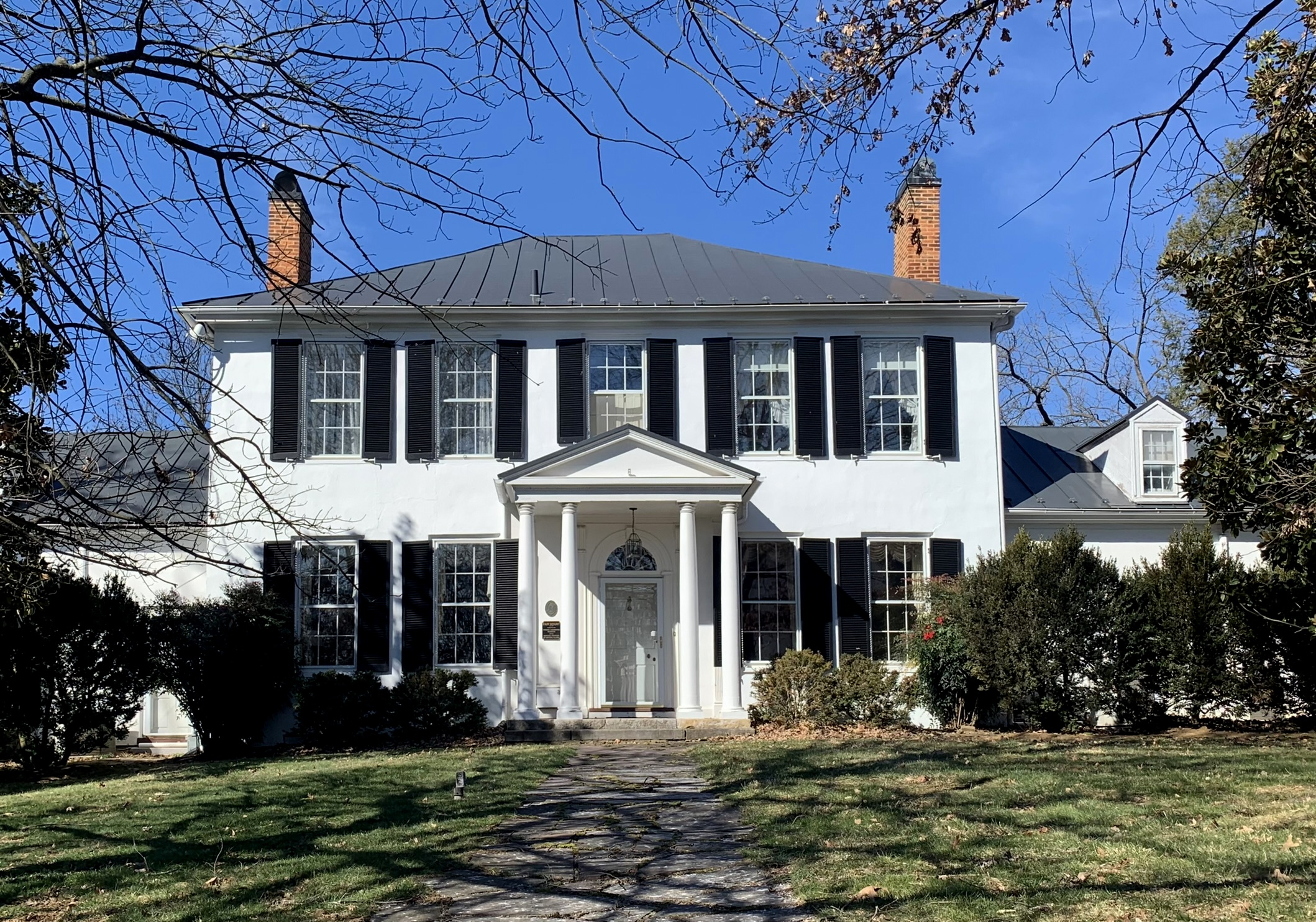
- Fair Mount, February 2022

- Location within Virginia Location within the United States
- Location: 311 Fairmount Ave., Winchester, Virginia
- Coordinates: 39°11′19″N 78°10′6″W
- Area: 2.3 acres (0.93 ha)
- Built: c. 1809, 1929
- Built by: Barnett, Lewis; Edmonds, Stuart
- Architectural style: Georgian, Federal
- NRHP reference No.: 03001431
- VLR No.: 138-0042-0428

Significant dates
- Added to NRHP: January 16, 2004
- Designated VLR: September 10, 2003

Fair Mount is a historic home located at Winchester, Virginia. It was built about 1809 by Lewis Barnett for local merchant Joseph Tidball. It is a two-story, five-bay, stuccoed stone dwelling, with 1 1/2-story flanking wings. The house exhibits elements of the Late Georgian style in its massing and elements of the Federal style in its detailing. It was remodeled in 1929 in the Colonial Revival Style and the formal gardens and garage constructed.

It was added to the National Register of Historic Places in 2004. It is located in the Winchester Historic District.
