= Hawthorne and Old Town Spring =

Historic house in Virginia, United States

- U.S. National Register of Historic Places
- Virginia Landmarks Register
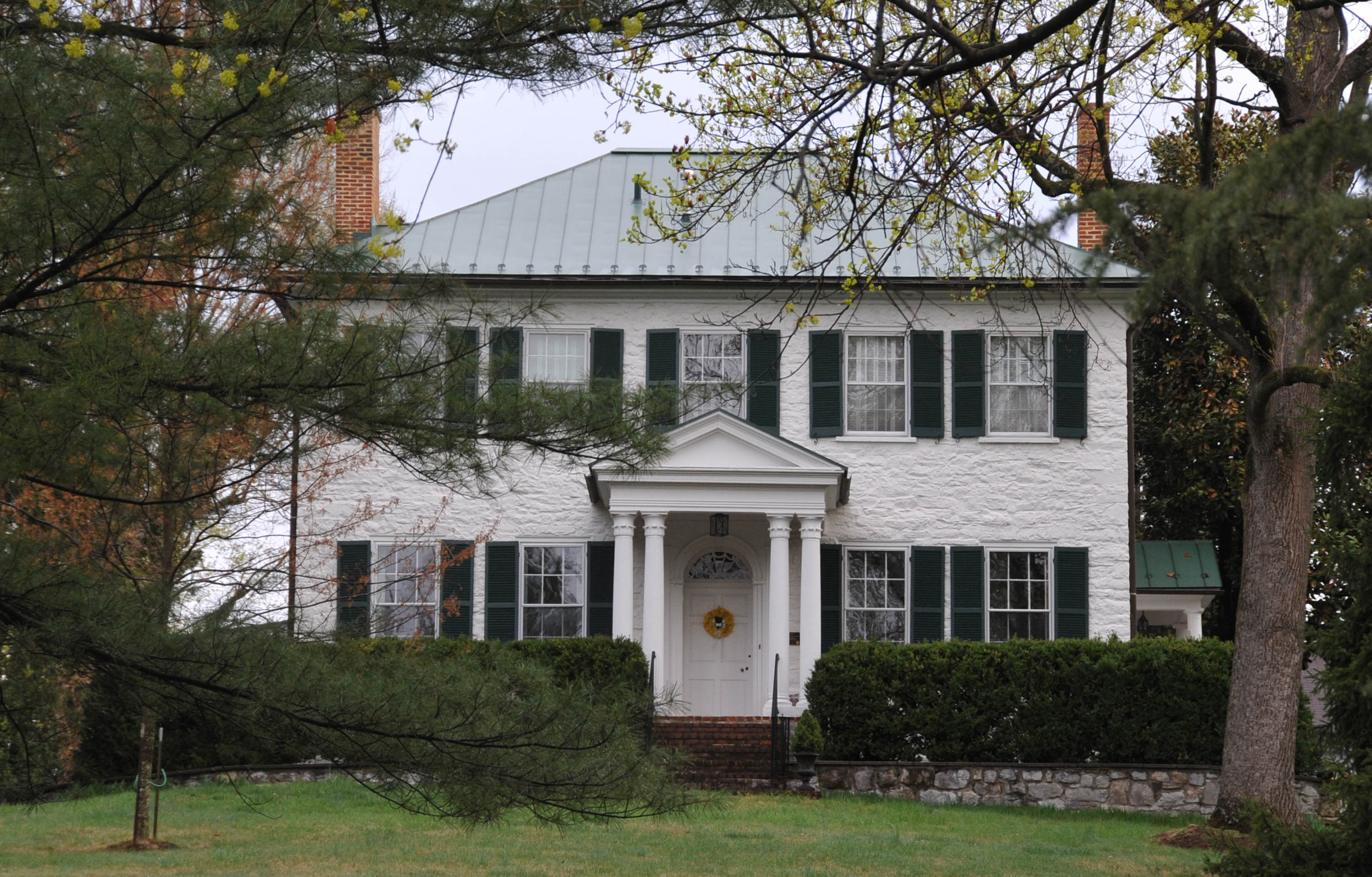

- Location within Virginia Location within the United States
- Location: 610 and 730 Amherst Street, Winchester, Virginia
- Coordinates: 39°11′18″N 78°10′34″W
- Area: 5 acres (2.0 ha)
- Built: c. 1811, c. 1816, c. 1840, 1915
- Architectural style: Late Georgian, Federal
- NRHP reference No.: 13000364
- VLR No.: 138-0030

Significant dates
- Added to NRHP: June 5, 2013
- Designated VLR: March 21, 2013

Hawthorne and Old Town Spring is a historic home and spring located at Winchester, Virginia, United States. Hawthorne was built about 1811, and is a two-story, five-bay, Late Georgian style stone dwelling with Federal style detailing. It has a hipped roof and rear service wing added about 1840. The Old Town Spring is a brick spring house built about 1816. Also on the property are contributing stone entry gateposts and walls and a stone garage built about 1915. The spring and the early-19th-century spring house that rests above it have been owned by the City for nearly 175 years.

It was added to the National Register of Historic Places in 2013.
