= Triangle Diner =

Historic commercial building in Virginia, United States

- The Triangle Diner
- U.S. National Register of Historic Places
- Virginia Landmarks Register
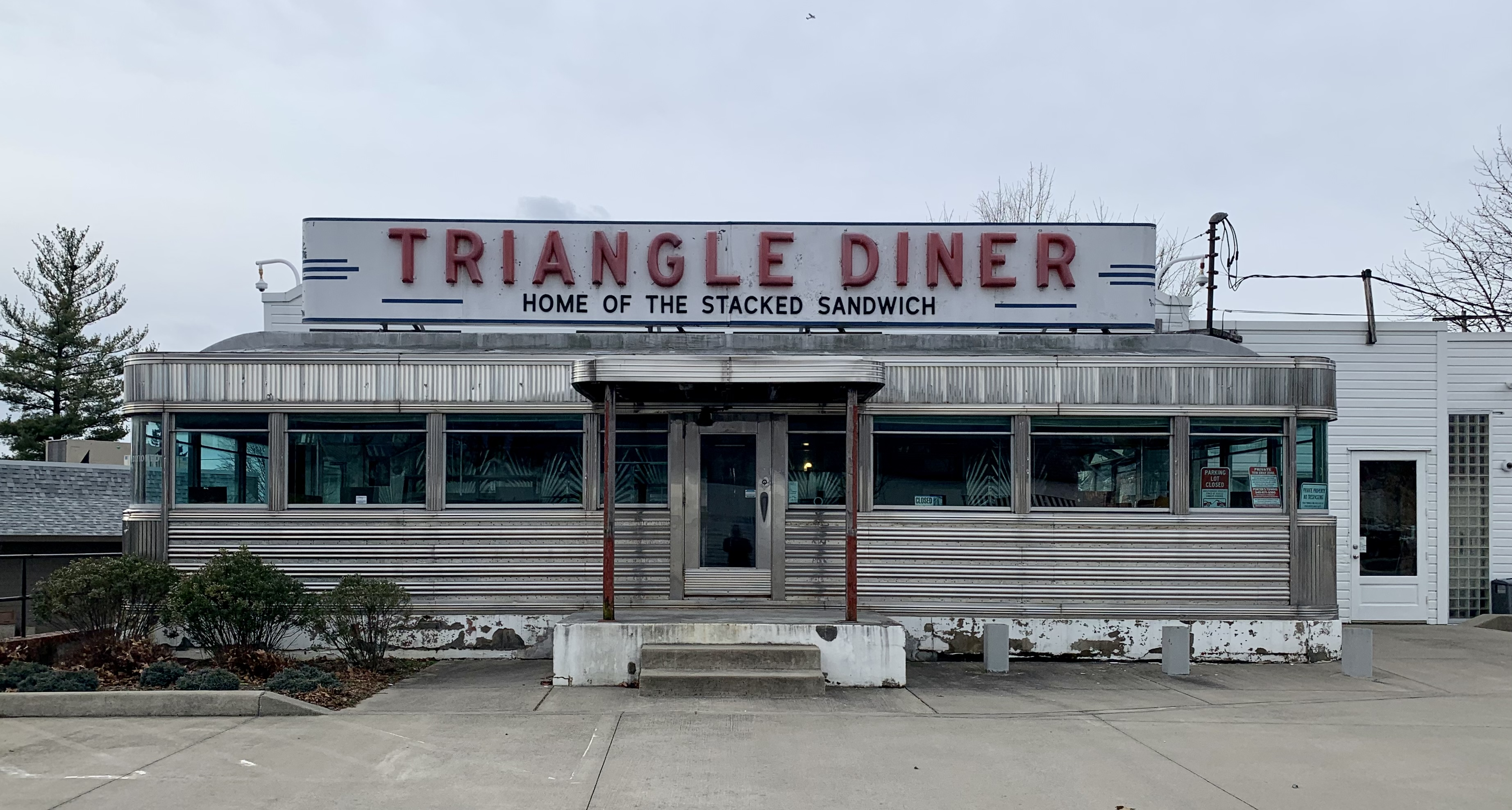
- Triangle Diner in 2022

- Location within Virginia Location within the United States
- Location: 27 W. Gerrard St., Winchester, Virginia
- Coordinates: 39°10′43″N 78°10′12″W
- Area: 0.2 acres (0.081 ha)
- Architect: O'Mahony, Jerry, Inc.
- Architectural style: Modern Movement
- MPS: Diners of Virginia MPS
- NRHP reference No.: 10000148
- VLR No.: 138-5004

Significant dates
- Added to NRHP: March 31, 2010
- Designated VLR: December 17, 2009

The Triangle Diner is an American diner in Winchester, Virginia. It was built in 1948 by the Jerry O'Mahony Diner Company of Elizabeth, New Jersey.

It is one of the best preserved classic diners in America, with close to 100% of the original features still intact. Key features include elaborate stainless steel ornamentation on the exterior, rounded interior ceiling with hidden lighting cove on all sides, a counter with stools and booths for patron seating, and terrazzo concrete floor. O'Mahony was a major producer of roadside diners, known for establishing specific manufacturing and construction standards the industry.

O'Mahony's work served as an inspiration for other diner manufacturers throughout the 1940s and 1950s. The Triangle Diner is an example of "Moderne architectural features" that are representative of the stainless steel prefabricated diners of the post–World War II era. The entire diner building – approximately 43 by 16 feet – was built at the O'Mahony Diner Company factory in New Jersey and once fully complete was then transported by train nearly 300 miles to Winchester, Virginia. It has been at the same intersection in Winchester since it first arrived, more than 60 years ago. Diners of this design somewhat resemble and are often confused with railroad cars removed from their wheels.

The Triangle Diner was listed on the National Register of Historic Places by the U.S. Department of the Interior on March 31, 2010, and was added to the Virginia Landmarks Register on December 17, 2009. The building is currently closed pending the completion of a comprehensive restoration that stalled out in 2014. The Triangle Diner is the older of only two stainless steel O’Mahony diners in Virginia. Of the more than 2,000 O'Mahony diners once built, only a few dozen still remain nationwide.

Country music legend Patsy Cline worked at the diner for three years after dropping out of high school to help support her mother and siblings.
