= Douglas School =

Historic building in Virginia, US

- U.S. National Register of Historic Places
- Virginia Landmarks Register
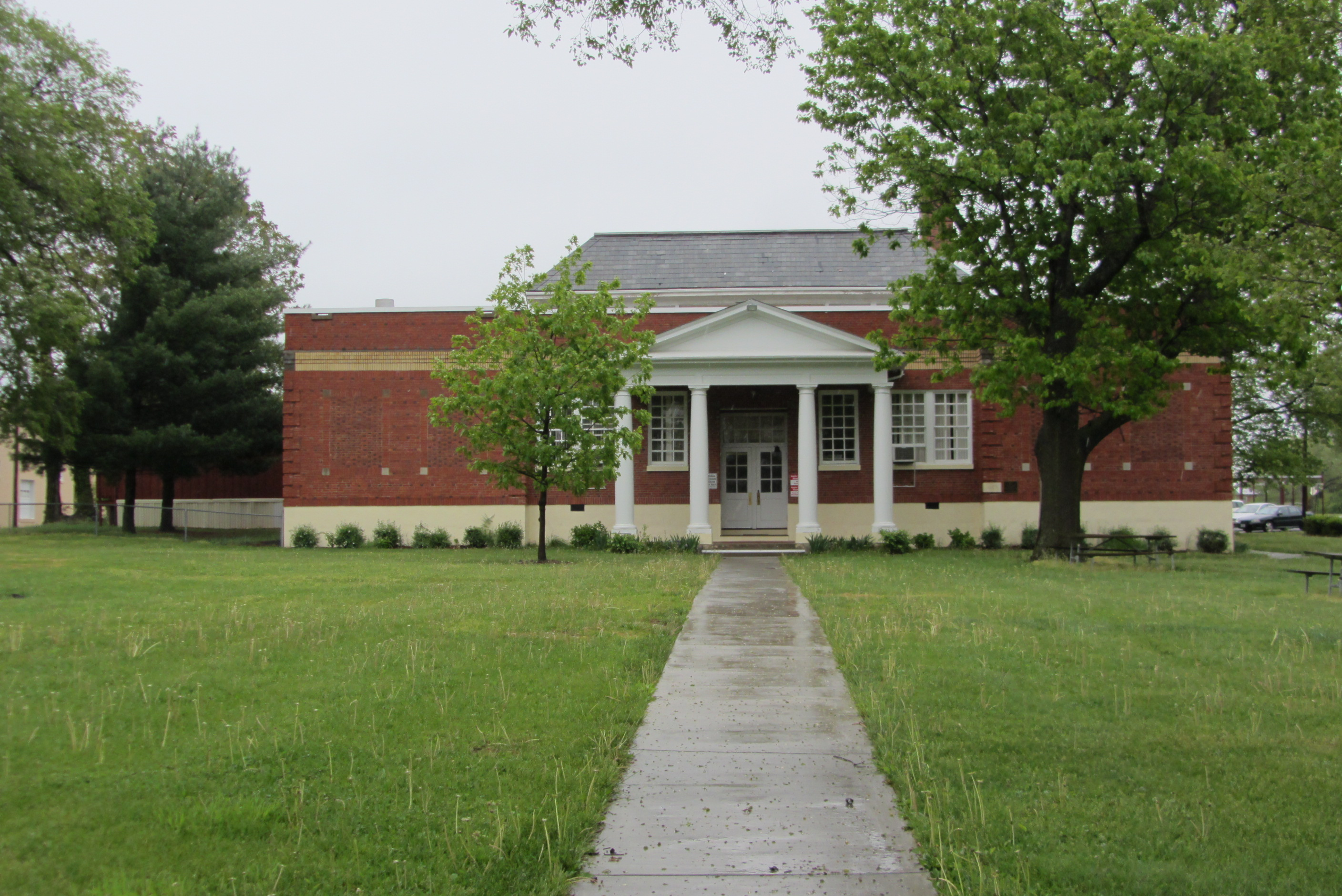
- Douglas School, April 2012

- Location within Virginia Location within the United States
- Location: 598 N. Kent St., Winchester, Virginia
- Coordinates: 39°11′33″N 78°09′30″W
- Area: 9.5 acres (3.8 ha)
- Built: 1927
- Architect: Long, R.V.; Gardner & Newcome
- Architectural style: Classical Revival
- NRHP reference No.: 00000558
- VLR No.: 138-5002

Significant dates
- Added to NRHP: May 26, 2000
- Designated VLR: September 15, 1999

Douglas School, also known as the Douglas Community Learning Center, is a historic school for African-American students located at Winchester, Virginia. It is a central auditorium plan school built in 1927, with funds from the John Handley Endowment. It is a one-story, dark red brick building with a four columned, Classical Revival style entry. Additions to the building were made in 1940, 1951, and 1962. The school served as the only African-American school in the city until 1966, when it was closed after integration of the Winchester schools.

Built in 1927 as a "separate but equal" school for African American students but converted to a community center in 1966 after desegregation; may have been named for Frederick Douglass, despite the spelling difference.

It was added to the National Register of Historic Places in 2000.
