= Charles Moss =

Charles Moss may refer to:

- Charles Moss (bishop of Bath and Wells) (1711–1802), Anglican clergyman
- Charles Moss (bishop of Oxford) (1763–1811), Church of England bishop
- Charles Moss (cyclist) (1882–1963), English road racing cyclist
- Charles Moss (judge) (1840–1912), Canadian lawyer and judge
- Charles Edward Moss (1870–1930), English-born South African botanist
- Charles Franklin Moss (1878–1961), African American photographer and painter
- Charlie Moss (1911–1991), American Major League Baseball catcher
- Chuck Moss (born 1953), member of the Michigan House of Representatives
- Mal Moss (Charles Malcolm Moss, 1905–1983), American baseball pitcher and attorney
