= Lee Taylor =

Lee Taylor may refer to:

- R. Lee Taylor (1924-2000), curator of the Museum of the Shenandoah Valley, U.S.
- Lee Taylor (sailor), world water speed record holder 1967–1977
- Lee Taylor (actor) in The Mechanism (TV series)

== See also ==
- Leigh H. Taylor, American attorney, professor and law school dean
- Leigh Taylor-Young (born 1945), American actor
