= Notary public (Pennsylvania) =

Public officer

A notary public in the Commonwealth of Pennsylvania is an appointed official who acts as an impartial witness and helps defend against fraud.

In Pennsylvania, a notary public is empowered to perform six official acts: taking an acknowledgment, administering an oath or affirmation, taking a verification on oath or affirmation (includes an affidavit), witnessing or attesting a signature, certifying or attesting a copy or deposition, and noting a protest of a negotiable instrument.

A notary is strictly prohibited from giving legal advice or drafting legal documents such as contracts, mortgages, leases, wills, powers of attorney, liens or bonds.

There are more than 74,000 notaries in the state; of that, 2,137 have also been approved by the Secretary of the Commonwealth to notarize electronically.

With electronic notarization, the notary and customer are in the same room. The notary properly identifies the customer through personal knowledge, satisfactory evidence or with a credible witness. The notary and customer use a computer to complete the notarization and sign an electronic document.

During the COVID-19 pandemic in 2020, the Department of State permitted notaries to temporarily perform remote online notarizations. Remote online notarizations also include an electronic document, but the notarization occurs over the internet using state-approved audiovisual technology. The notary is in one location, the customer is in another location.

Both electronic and remote notaries must have current commissions and use technology from a state-approved vendor.

== History ==
As early as 1727, British-appointed notaries sympathetic to American independence, began administering "Oaths of Allegiance to the Commonwealth of Pennsylvania," in which individuals renounced their loyalty to Britain. These oaths were documents signed by groups of individuals, in the style of a petition, or were personally written or distributed in a pre-printed form that could be signed, witnessed and sealed.

The first official notary law was enacted in Pennsylvania in 1791. Isaac Craig, a Pittsburgh glassmaker, was the first notary to be appointed under the new, independent state constitution. Governor Charles Mifflin, the first constitutionally elected governor, appointed Craig, with whom he had served in the Revolutionary War.

Throughout the 17th and 18th centuries, notaries and Commissioners of Deeds played vital roles in documenting the formation of the country. They performed the notarial acts necessitated by owning property and titling land, electing governmental leaders, and building the economy. The 19th and 20th centuries saw the numbers of commissioned notaries increase dramatically to meet the needs of developing business and commerce, and the rise in the number of lawsuits in the country.

The Pennsylvania State Archives has preserved examples of the work of notaries through the last three centuries. The oldest document is a 1681 Land Charter which transferred ownership of the land that became Pennsylvania from King Charles II of England to William Penn. The State Archives also preserves what is probably the state's earliest recorded fraudulent land transfers. The 1737 Walking Purchase is an instrument which Penn's sons used to sell Indian land that their father had not purchased to a European land speculator. This illegal agreement deprived the Delaware Indians of the entire upper Delaware and Lehigh River valleys.

== Others authorized to act as notaries ==
Other officers of the Commonwealth are also authorized to act as notaries, including the secretary of the commonwealth, clerks of courts, judges, recorders of deeds and deputy recorders of deeds.

== Commissioners of deeds ==
Until July 1, 2003, the law required notaries to be residents of the state; non-residents were appointed commissioners of deeds, essentially a similar position. Thereafter, anyone who resides or works in Pennsylvania can be appointed as a notary, and the commissioner of deeds designation no longer exists.

== Notary public law ==
The Revised Uniform Law on Notarial Acts, Pennsylvania's notary law, became effective on October 26, 2017, and fundamentally changed the way in which Pennsylvania notaries fulfill their notarial duties.

It is suggested that Pennsylvania notaries follow the Pennsylvania Department of State's regulations proposed for Title 4, "Administration," of the Pennsylvania Code.

In addition to a new notary act - witnessing or attesting a signature, other changes included new and shorter wording for individual acknowledgments, certified or attested copies or depositions, and oaths or affirmations; revising an affidavit to a verification on oath or affirmation, and replacing a notary register with a notary journal which includes new, more detailed entries.

The law also mandates state-approved identification that notaries can accept from customers they do not know personally.

A three-hour notary education requirement for first-time and renewing notaries was instituted. First-time notaries must successfully complete a notary exam, while renewing notaries are required to take the notary exam only if they have a lapse in their commissions.

These represent the most significant changes to the notary public law since July 2003.
