= Museum of the Shenandoah Valley =

Regional museum in Winchester, Virginia

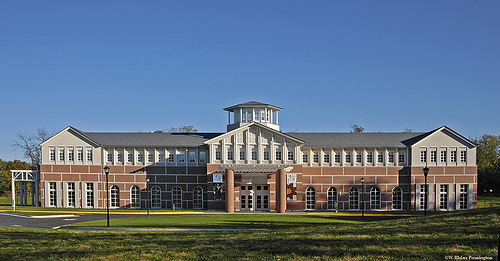

- Museum of the Shenandoah Valley Museum of the Shenandoah Valley (Virginia) Museum of the Shenandoah Valley (the United States)
- Established: 2005; 21 years ago
- Location: 901 Amherst Street; Winchester, Virginia 22601; United States
- Coordinates: 39.1854°N 78.1800°W
- Type: Fine arts, decorative arts, history
- Director: Scott Stroh
- Website: www.themsv.org

The Museum of the Shenandoah Valley (MSV) is a museum complex located in Winchester, Virginia, that opened in 2005. The institution comprises the museum building designed by architect Michael Graves, the historic Glen Burnie House, and a surrounding landscape of formal gardens. The museum focuses on the art, history, and material culture of the Shenandoah Valley and its surrounding region.

== House ==
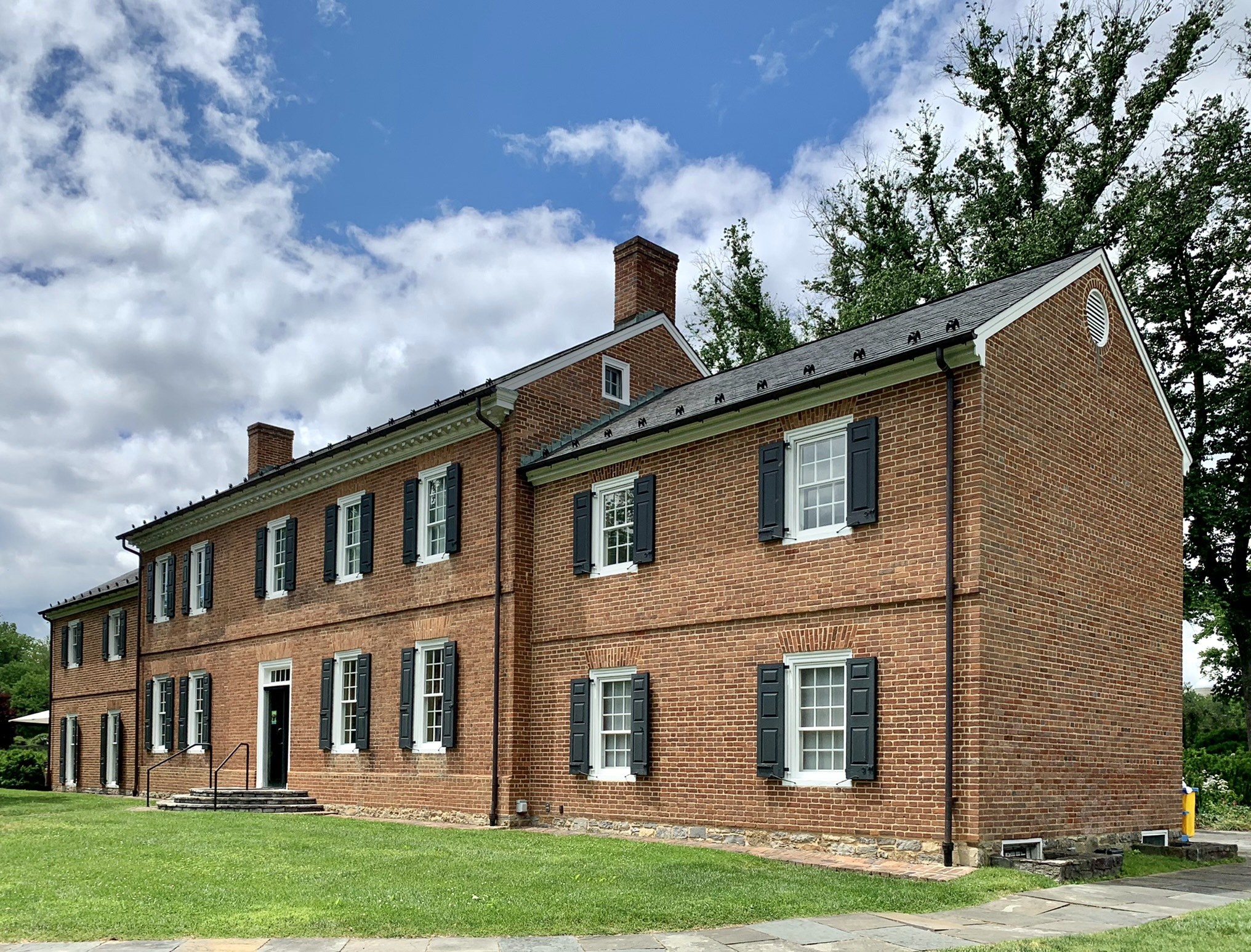
Glen Burnie House

The Glen Burnie House originated on land settled in the early 18th century by surveyor James Wood (d. 1759), who later donated portions of his property for the establishment of Winchester, Virginia, in 1744. His son, Robert Wood, constructed the central portion of the house in the 1790s. Ownership of the property remained within the Wood and Glass families for several generations until it was acquired by Julian Wood Glass Jr. (1910–1992) in 1955.

Beginning in 1959, Glass, with the assistance of his partner R. Lee Taylor, developed the property as a private country estate and designed what became known as the Glen Burnie Gardens. Prior to his death in 1992, Glass established the Glass-Glen Burnie Foundation and directed that the property be preserved and opened to the public as a museum. The Glen Burnie House and Gardens opened to visitors in 1998.

Today, interpretive panels tell the story of those who lived in the house from 1796 to 1992, and exhibitions are presented annually in the drawing room.

The house is listed on the National Register of Historic Places and the Virginia Landmarks Register.

== Gardens ==
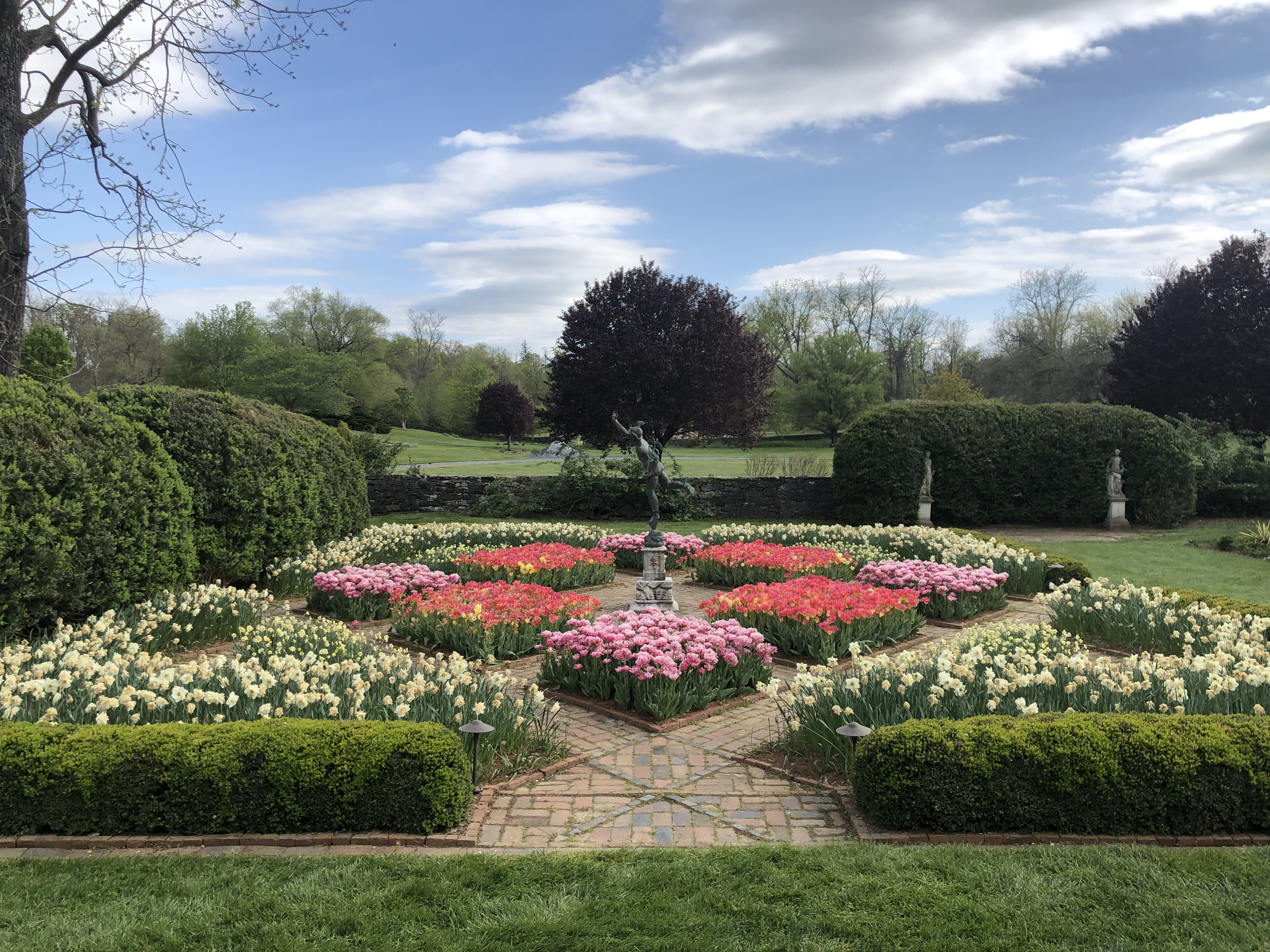
Tulip garden at the Glen Burnie Historic House.

The Glen Burnie Gardens were developed beginning in 1956 and expanded throughout the latter half of the 20th century. Designed for formal use, the gardens include sculptures, fountains, and ornamental structures. Identified areas include the Rose Garden, Statue Garden, Vegetable Garden, Asian Garden, and Perennial Garden. The Water Garden includes a pond stocked with golden trout. Each fall, the Gardens host an event called "Garden Lights," which allows visitors to take a self-guided walking tour of seasonal light displays.

== Museum ==
The Museum of the Shenandoah Valley was designed by architect Michael Graves and opened to the public in 2005. In December 2024, Scott Stroh was named Executive Director and CEO of the museum. The museum includes four main galleries: the Shenandoah Valley Gallery, Founders Gallery, R. Lee Taylor Miniatures Gallery, and a Changing Exhibitions Gallery.

=== Shenandoah Valley Gallery ===
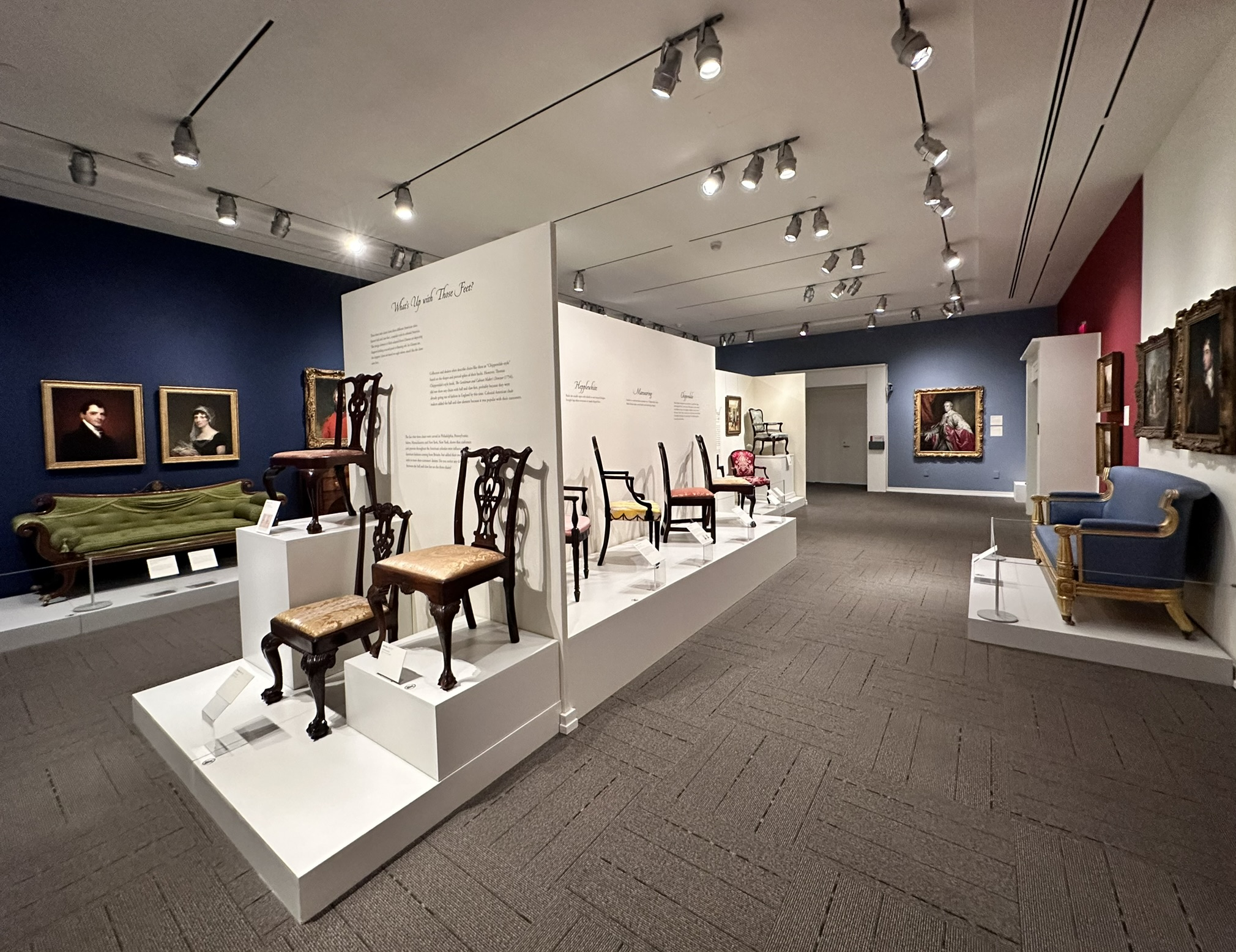
Founders Gallery

The Shenandoah Valley Gallery presents exhibitions on the prehistory and history of the region. Exhibition methods include multimedia presentations, interactive elements, images, maps, dioramas, and displays of decorative arts. Objects displayed include furniture, fraktur, silver and other metals, baskets, textiles, paintings, folk art, long rifles, and ceramics.

In 2021, the museum opened Contributions: African Americans in the Shenandoah Valley, an exhibition examining the historical experiences and contributions of African Americans in the region.

=== Founders Gallery ===
The Founders Gallery displays changing exhibitions including or relating to the private collection of benefactor Julian Wood Glass, Jr.

=== R. Lee Taylor Miniatures Gallery ===
This gallery presents a collection of furnished miniature houses and rooms by R. Lee Taylor (1924–2000), who lived at Glen Burnie from the late 1950s until his death. Taylor completed fourteen fully furnished miniature rooms and houses. The gallery exhibits five houses and four rooms, representing work by more than seventy-five miniature artisans. It also includes four shadowbox works created in the 1930s and 1940s by Valley miniatures artist William P. Massey.

=== Changing Exhibitions Gallery ===
The gallery presents several temporary exhibitions throughout the year.

== Selected highlights ==
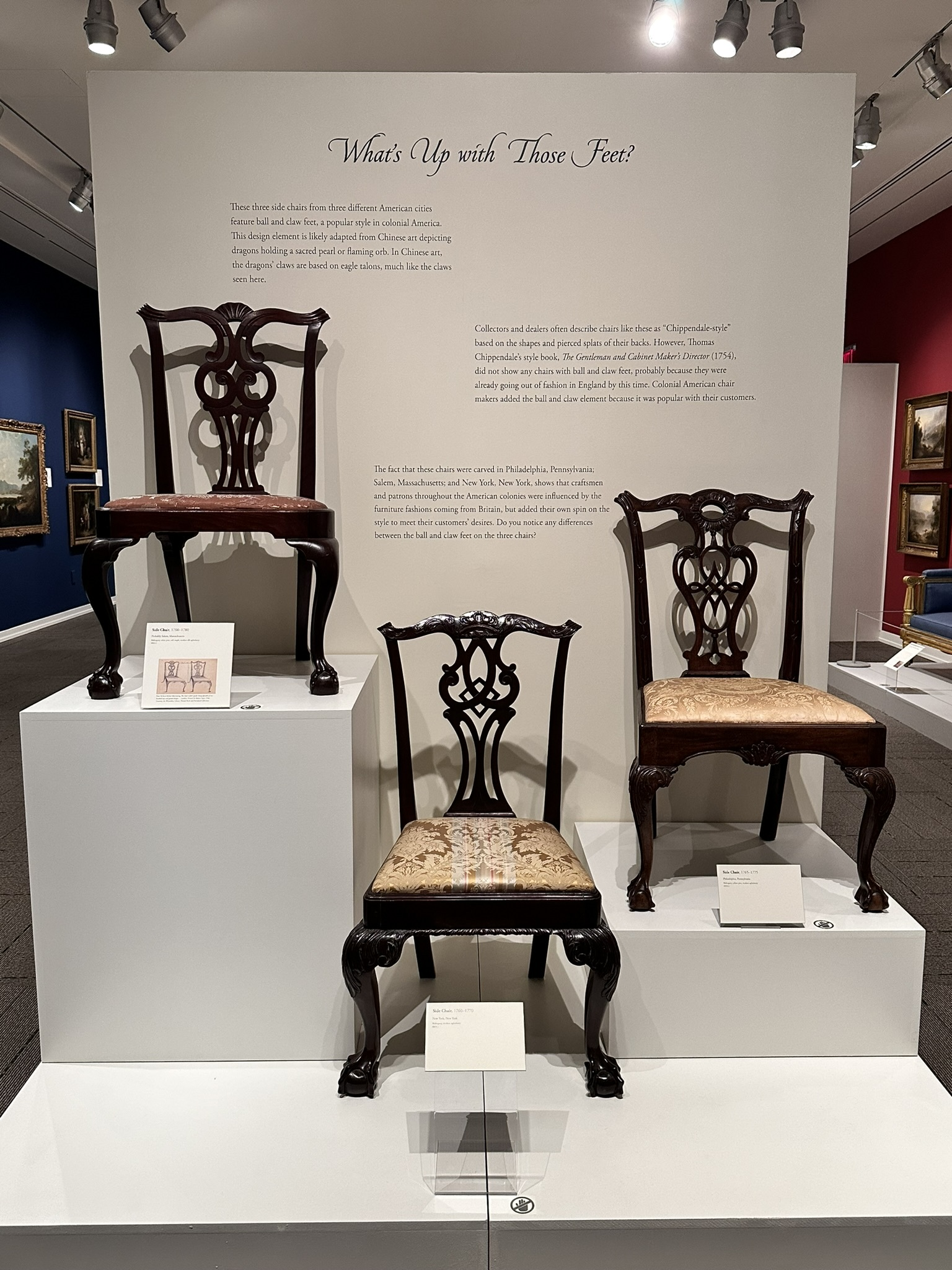
18th-century chairs

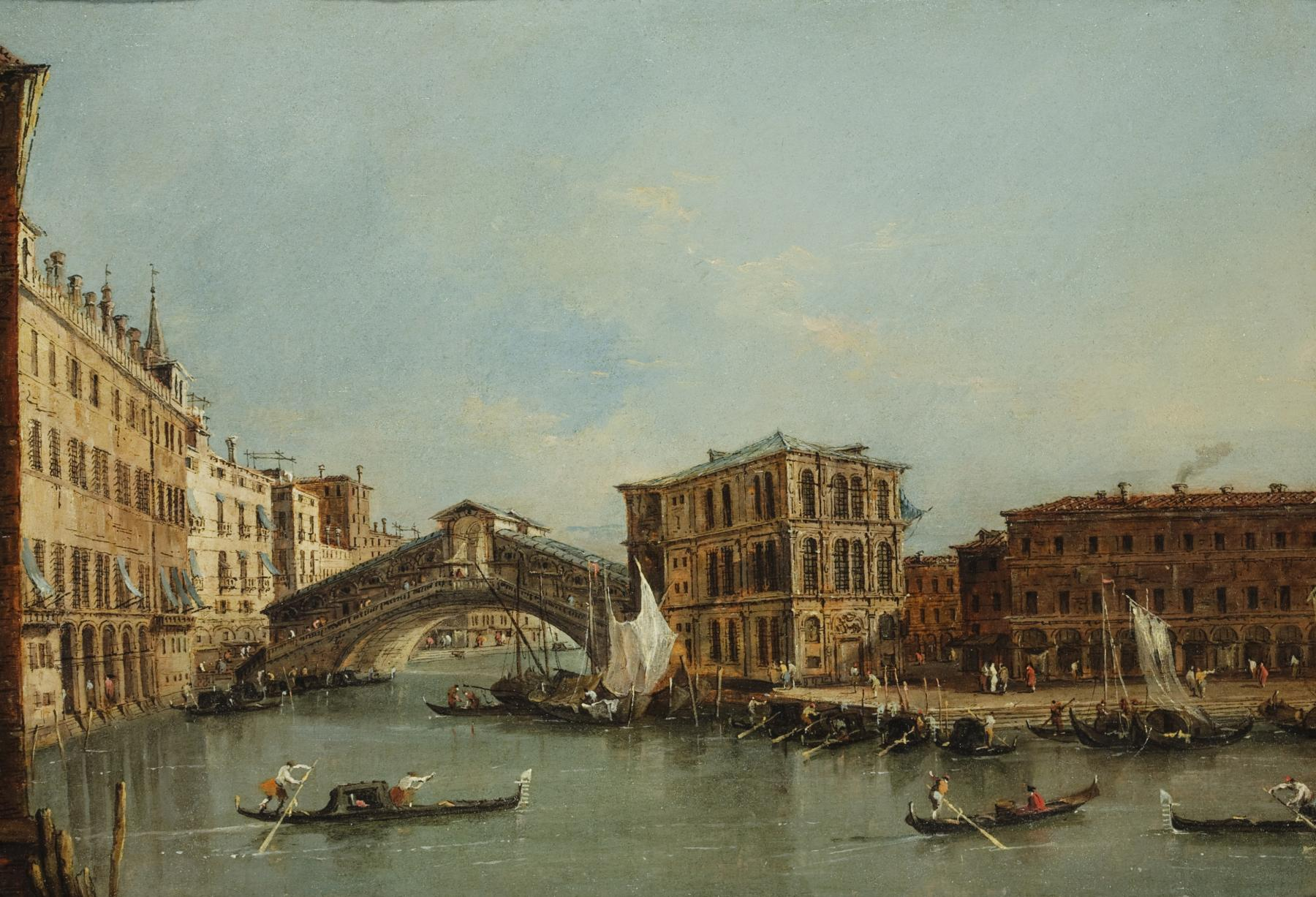
A View on the Grand Canal with the Rialto Bridge (1754), Francesco Guardi

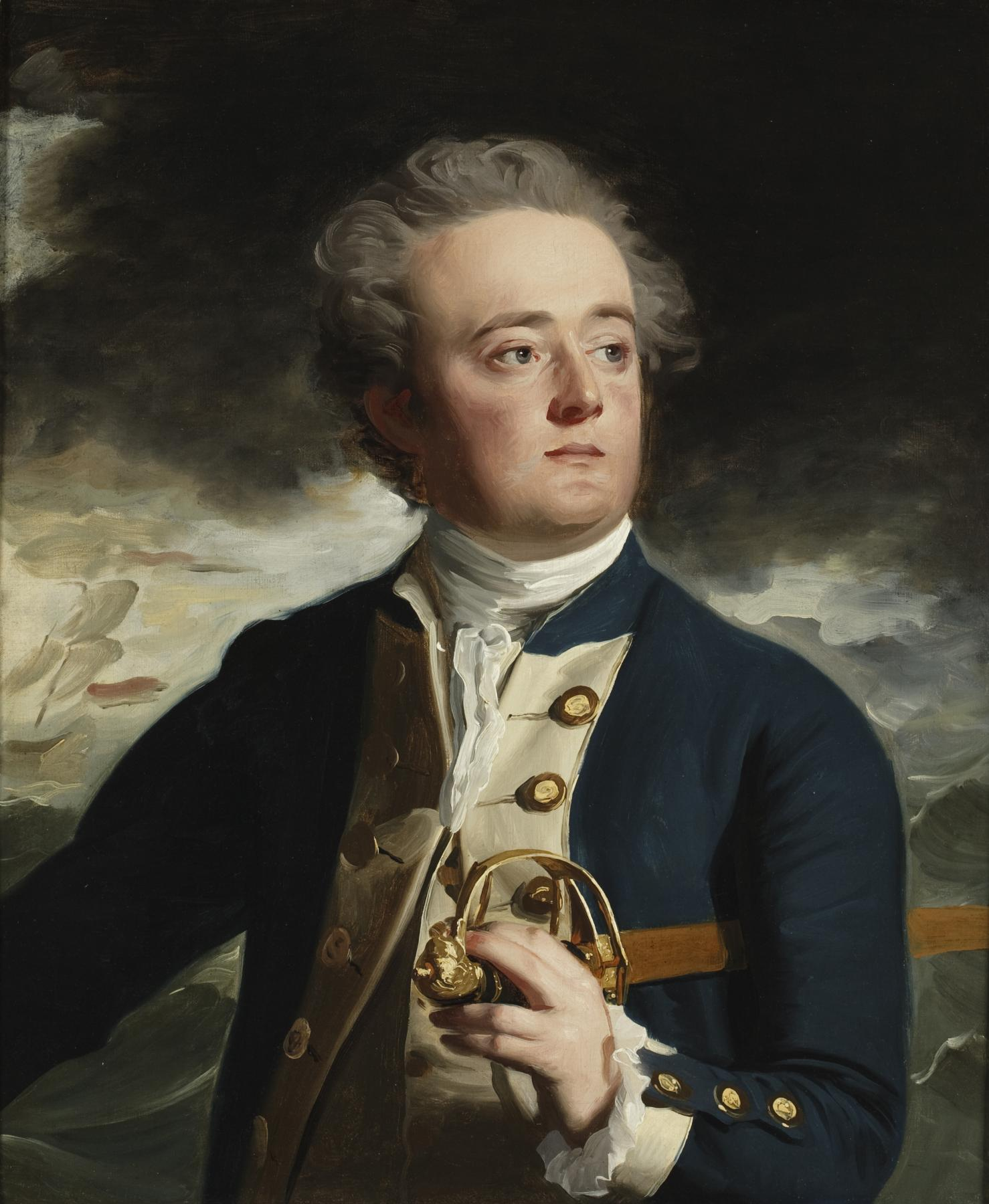
Captain John Loring (1780), John Singleton Copley

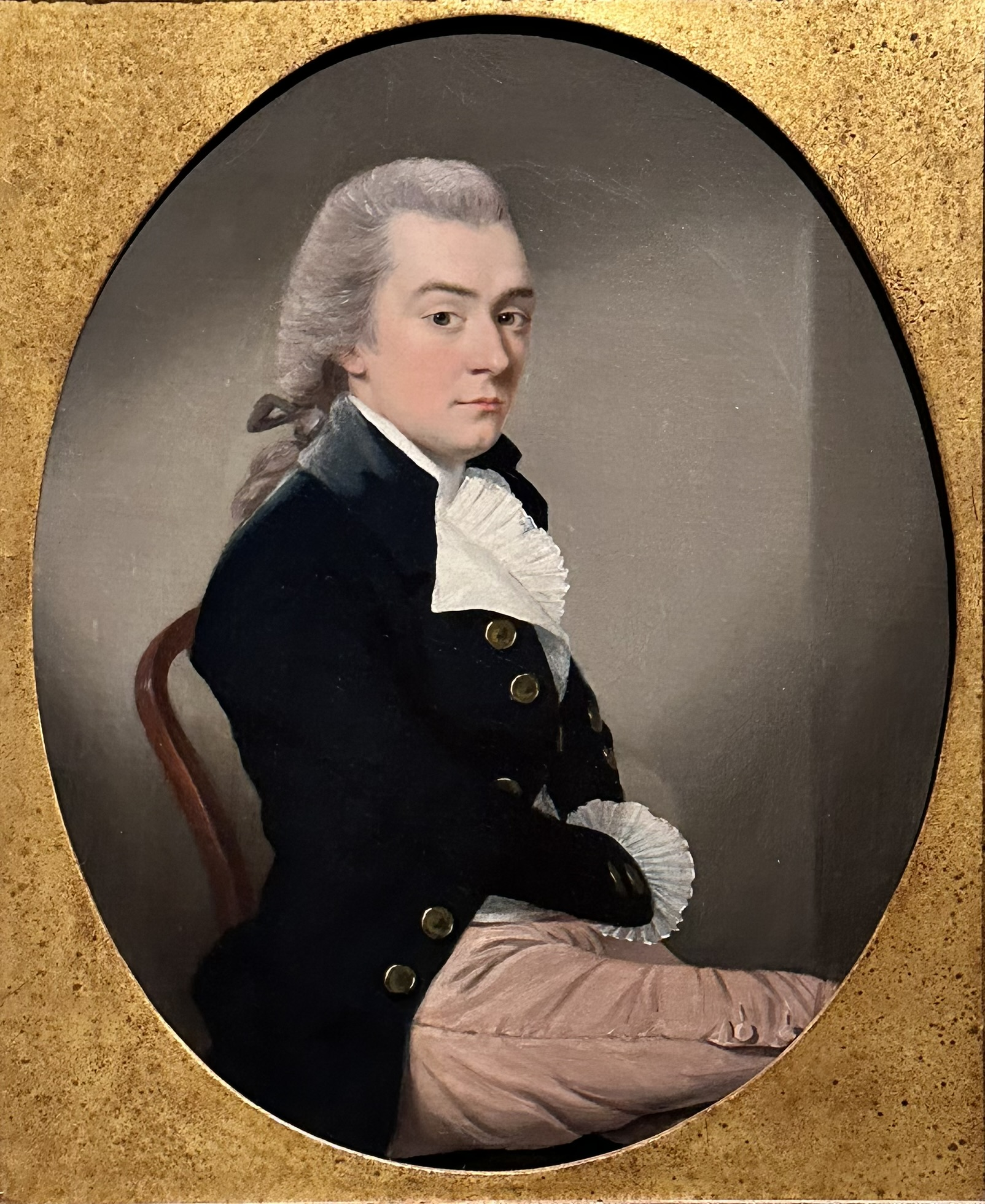
Hugh Chamberlain (1780s), Johan Zoffany

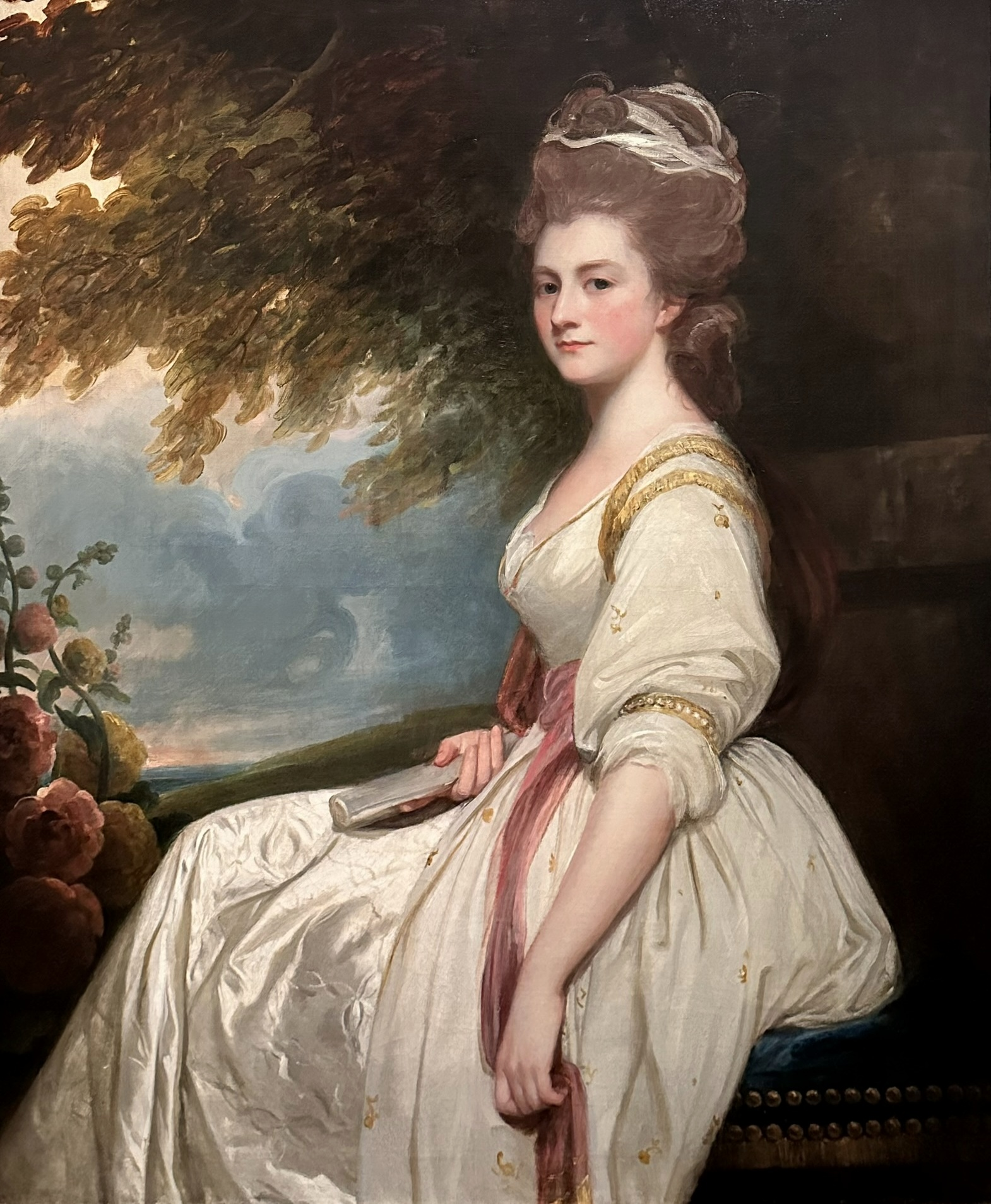
Elizabeth Taylor, Mrs. Charles Chaplin (1781), George Romney

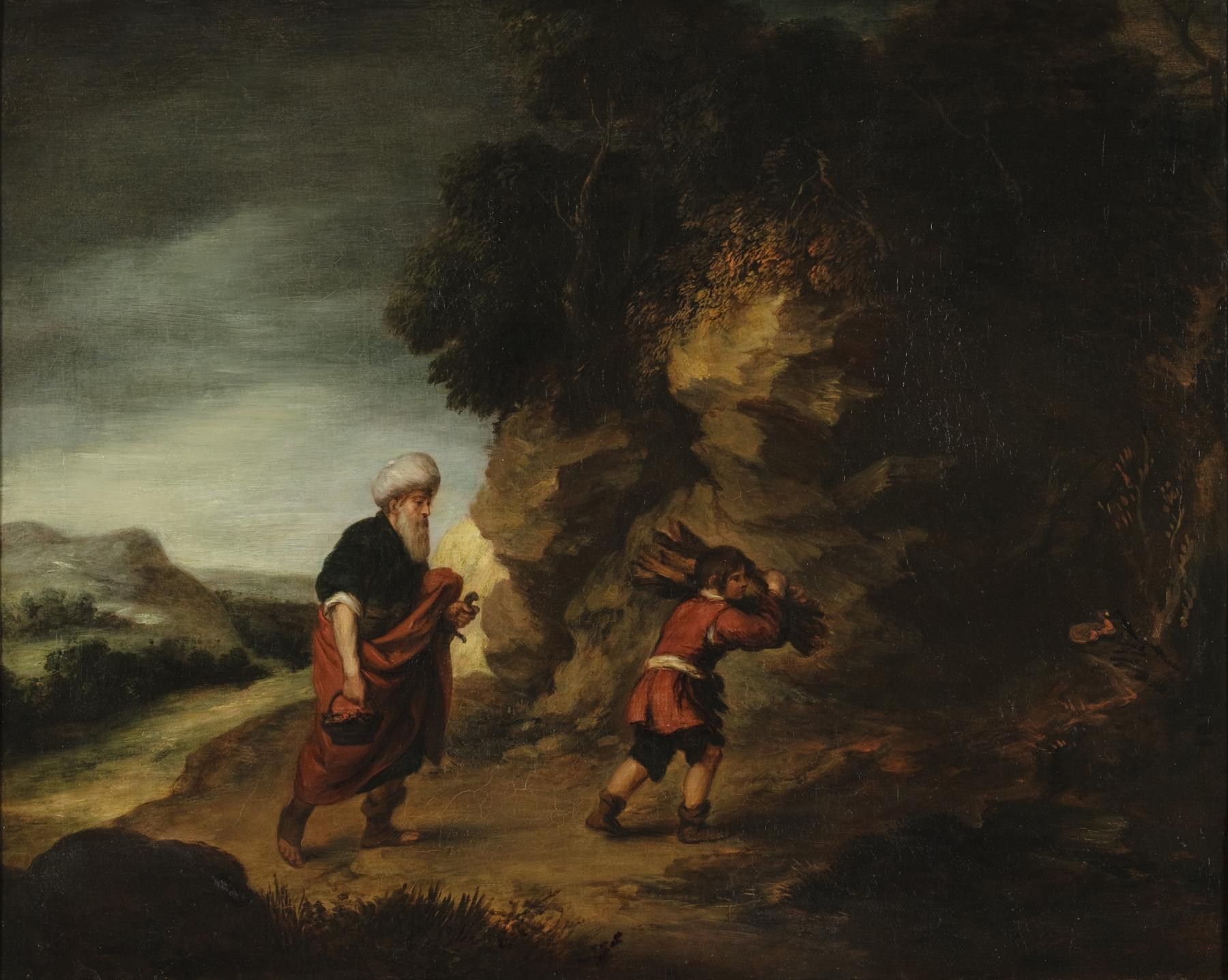
Abraham and Isaac (1787), Gainsborough Dupont

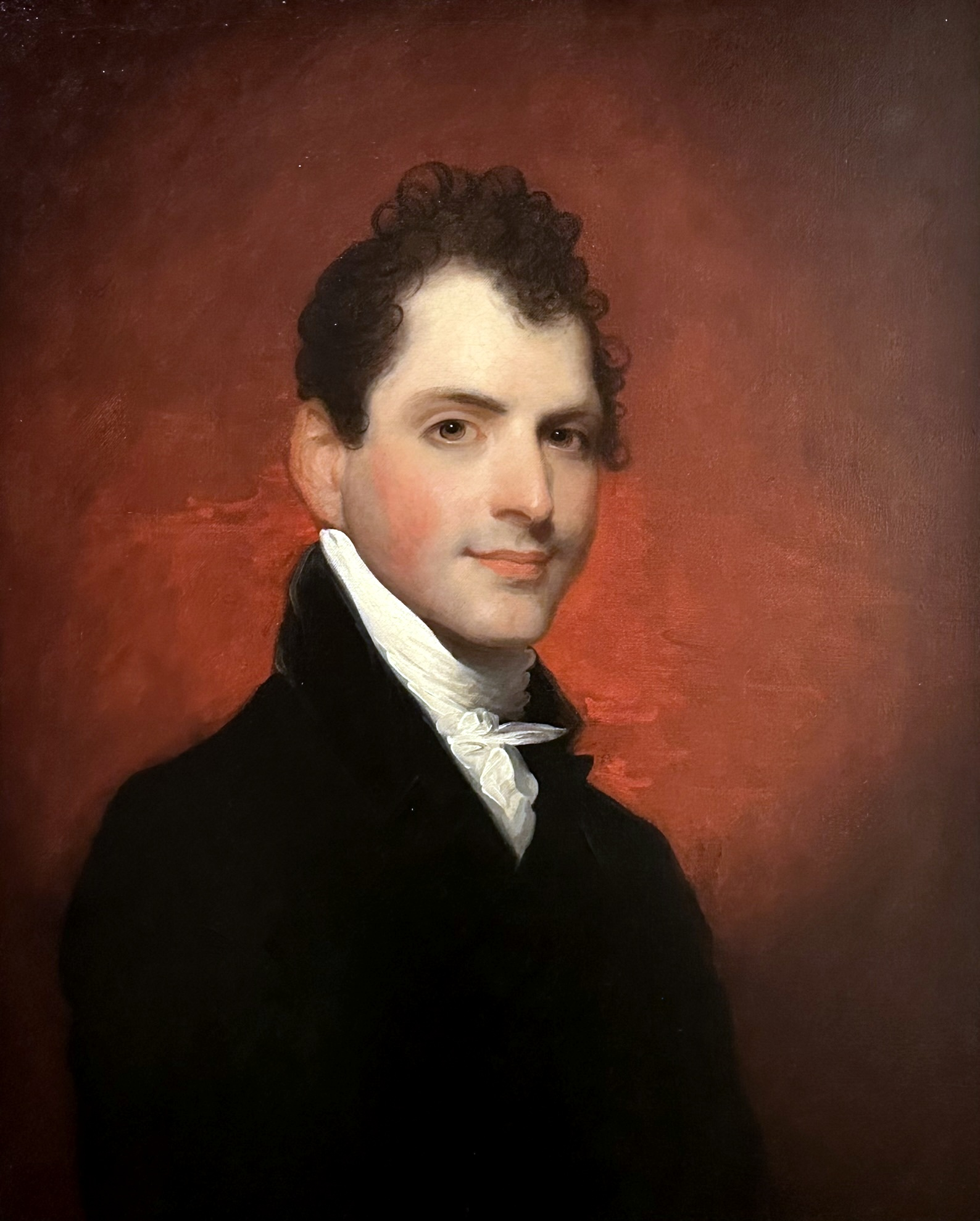
George Alexander Otis (1809), Gilbert Stuart

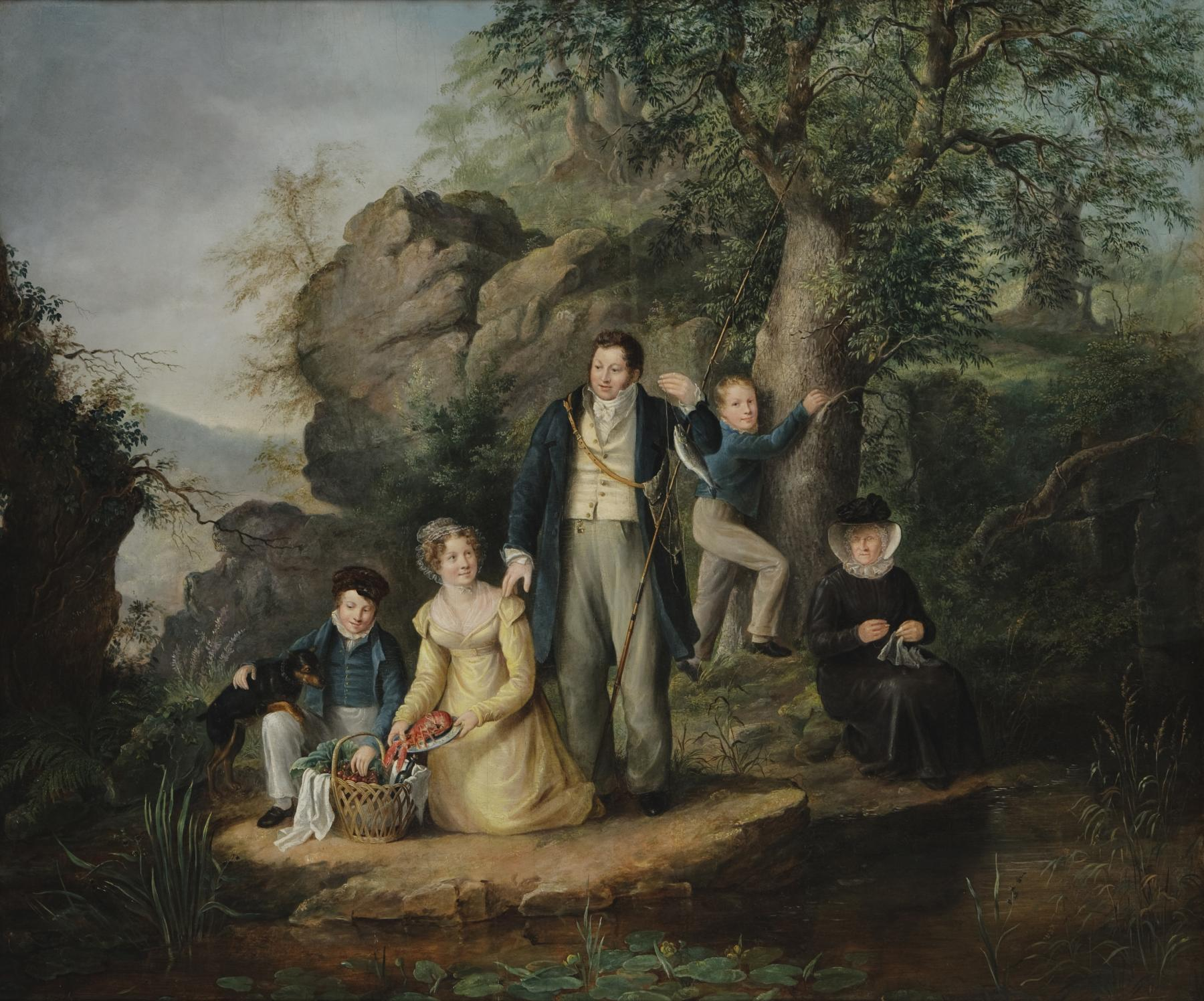
A Picnic in England (1825), Rolinda Sharples

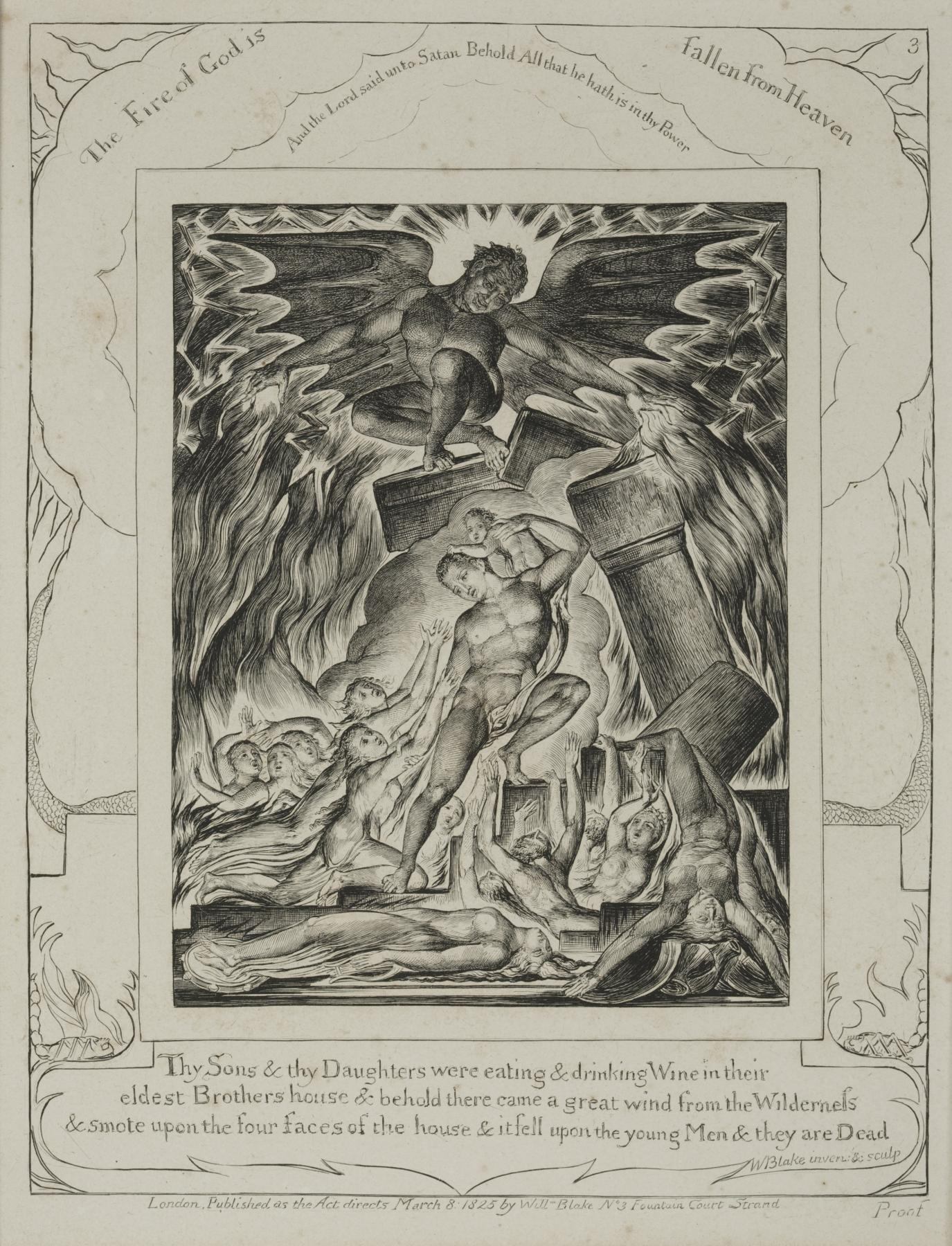
William Blake's Illustrations of the Book of Job (1826)

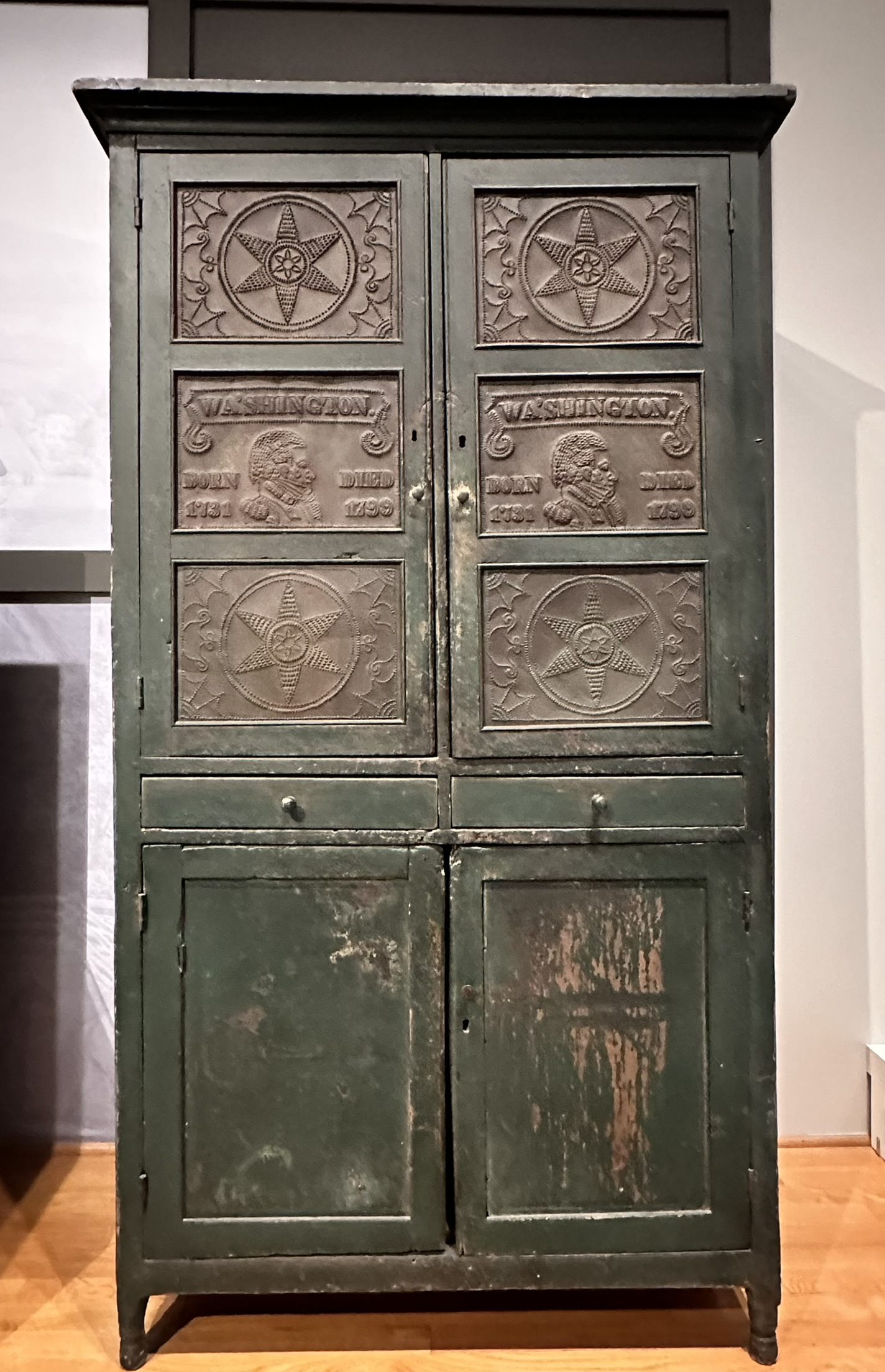
Closet safe (c. 1830)

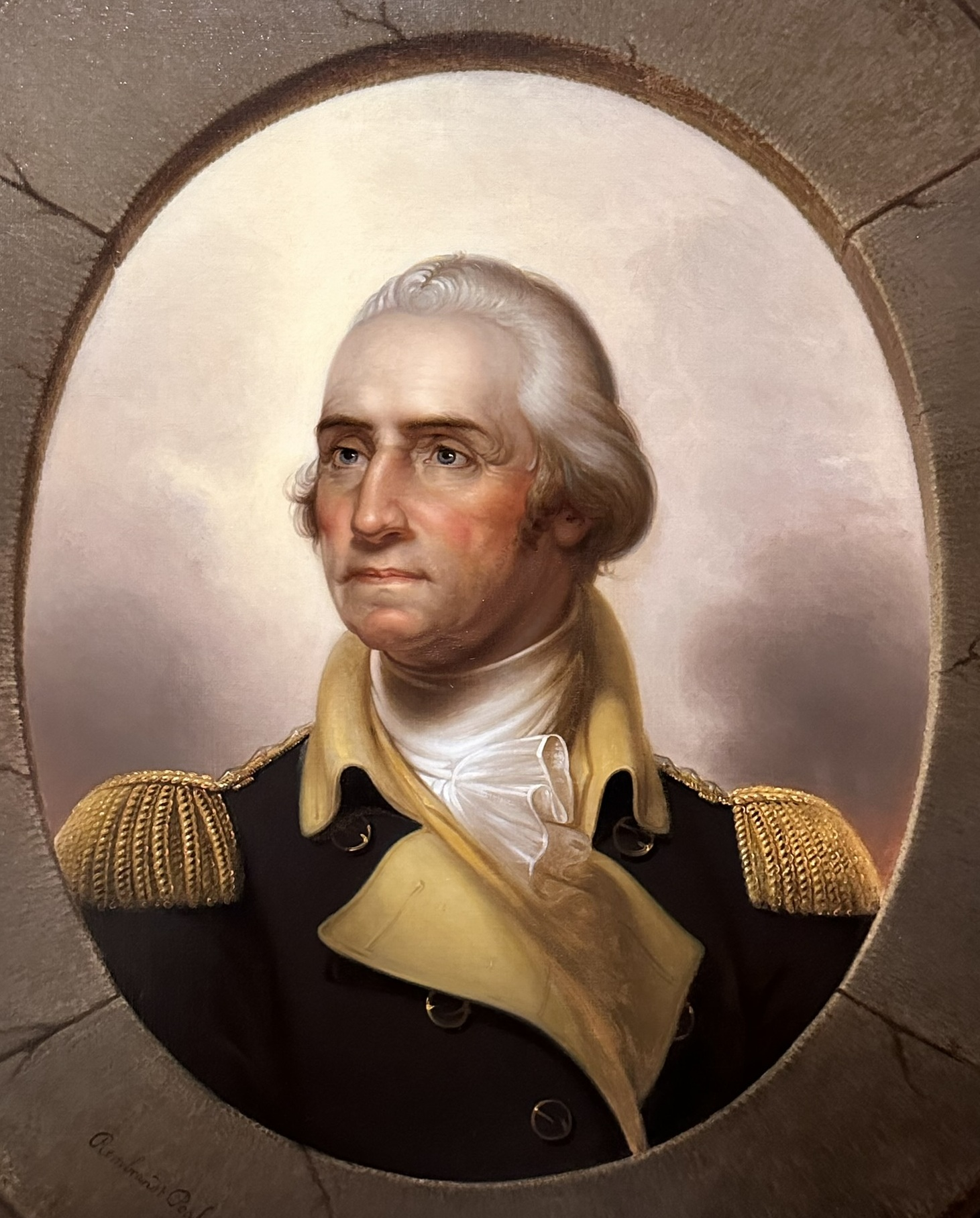
George Washington (1840s), Rembrandt Peale

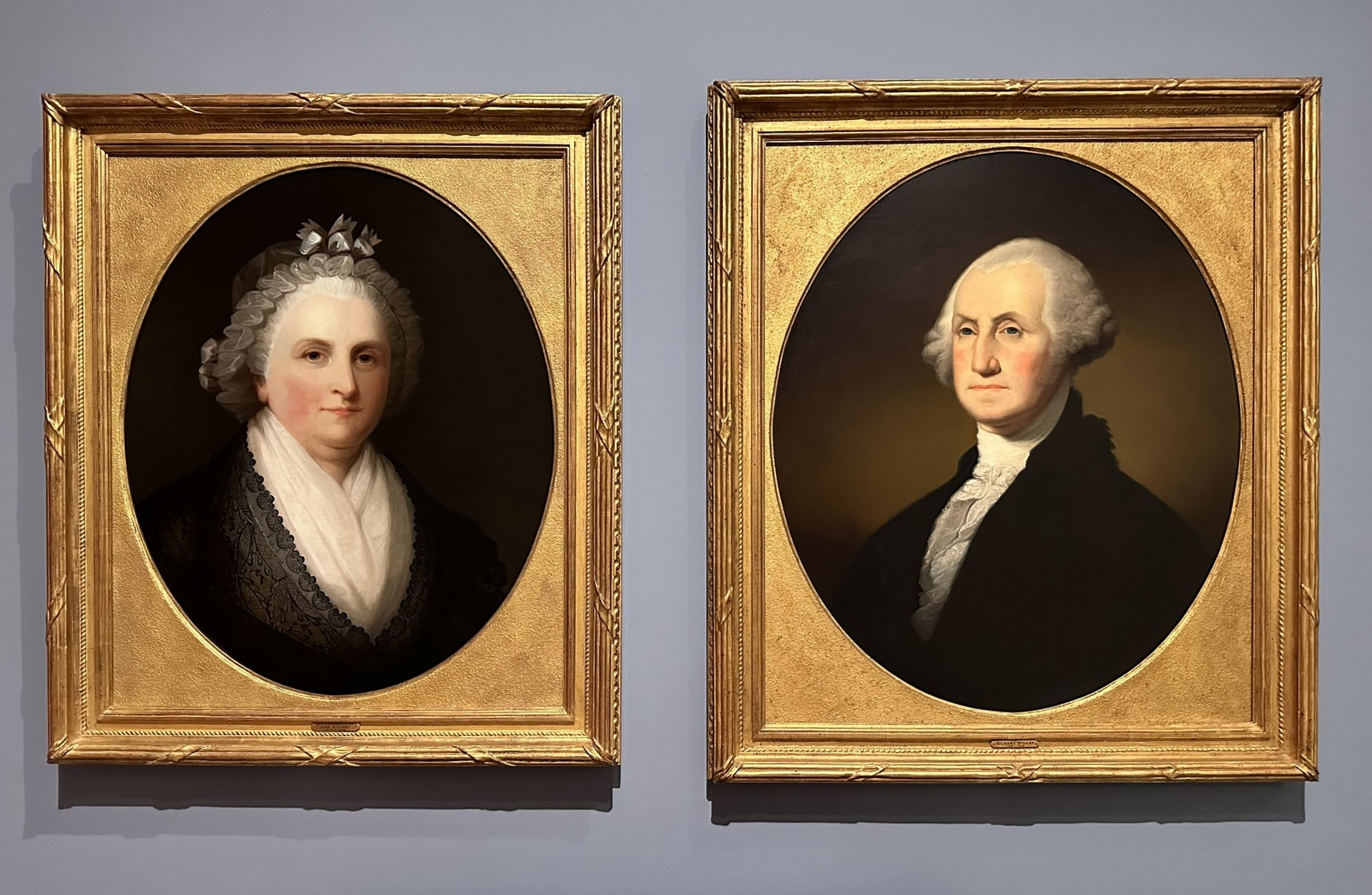
Martha Washington and George Washington (c. 1850), Jane Stuart

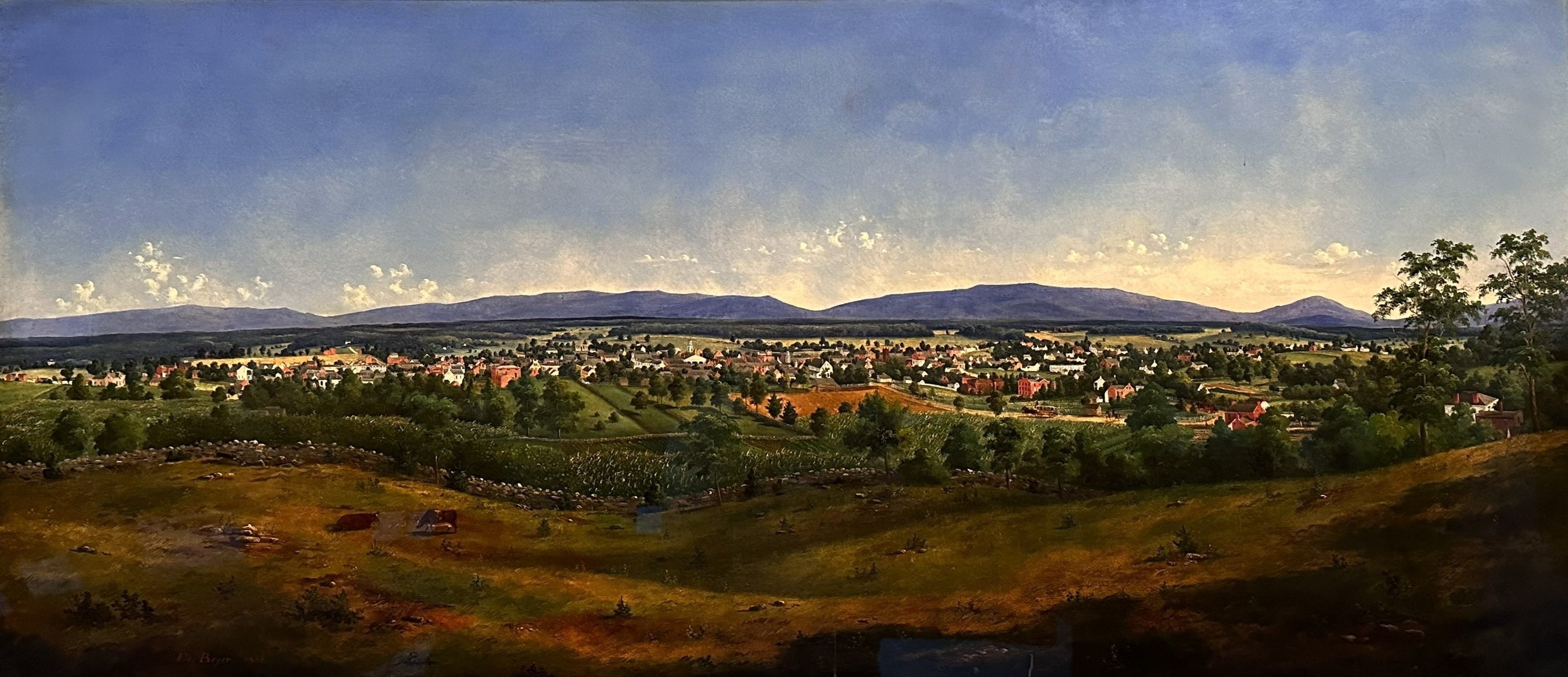
View of Winchester (1856), Edward Beyer

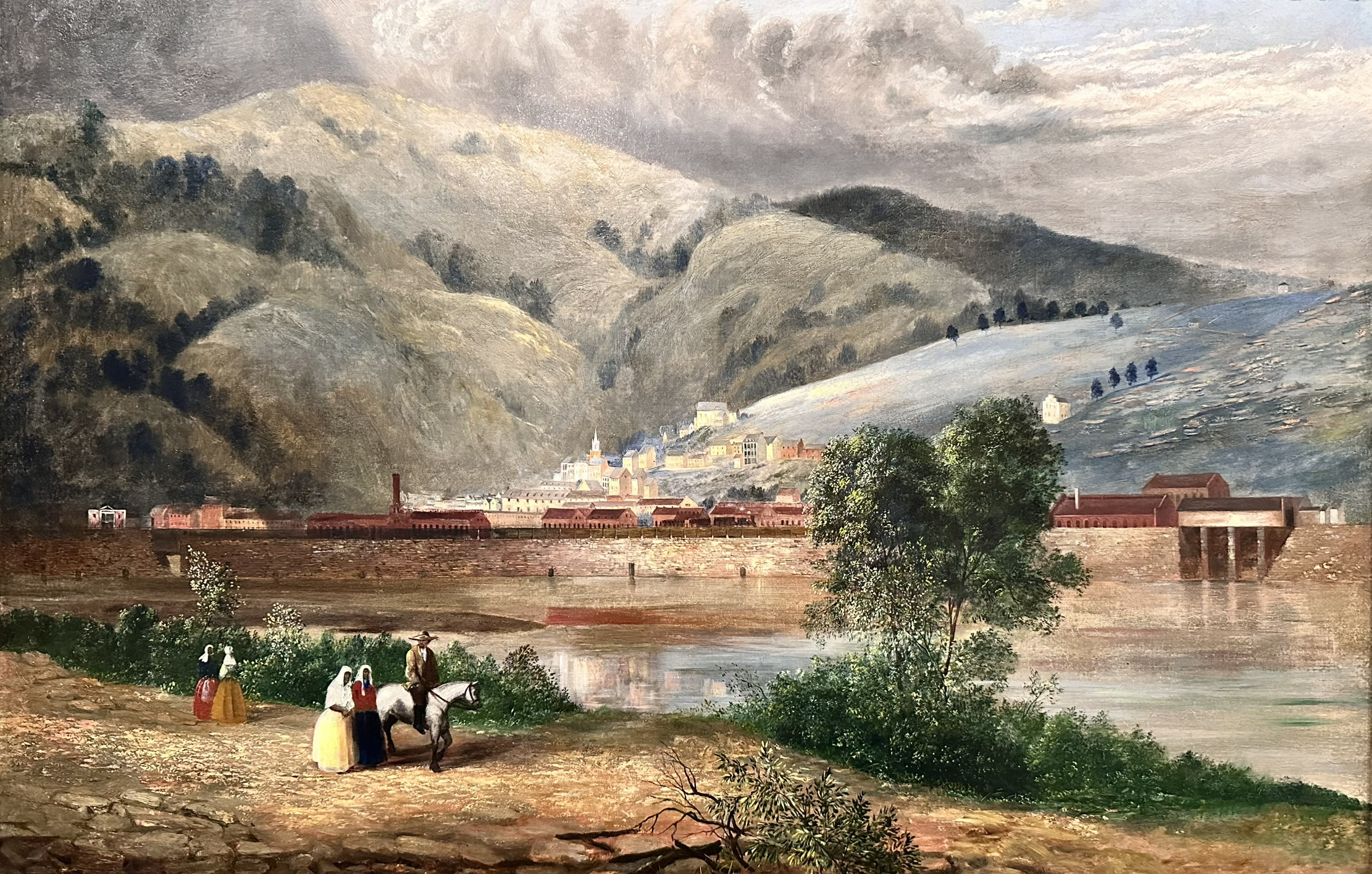
Harper's Ferry, Virginia (1859), Ferdinand Richardt

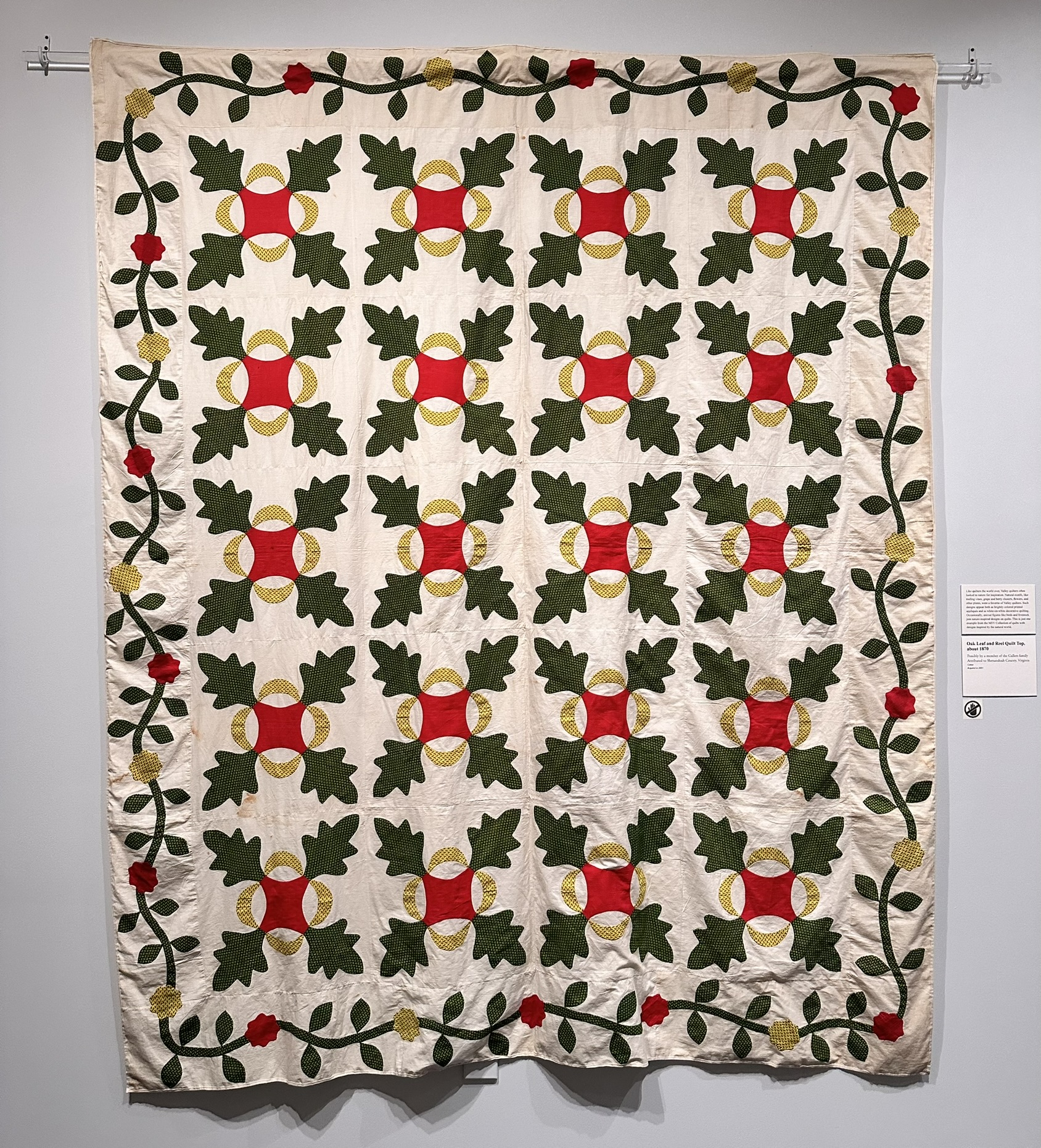
Oak Leaf and Reel Quilt Top (c. 1870)

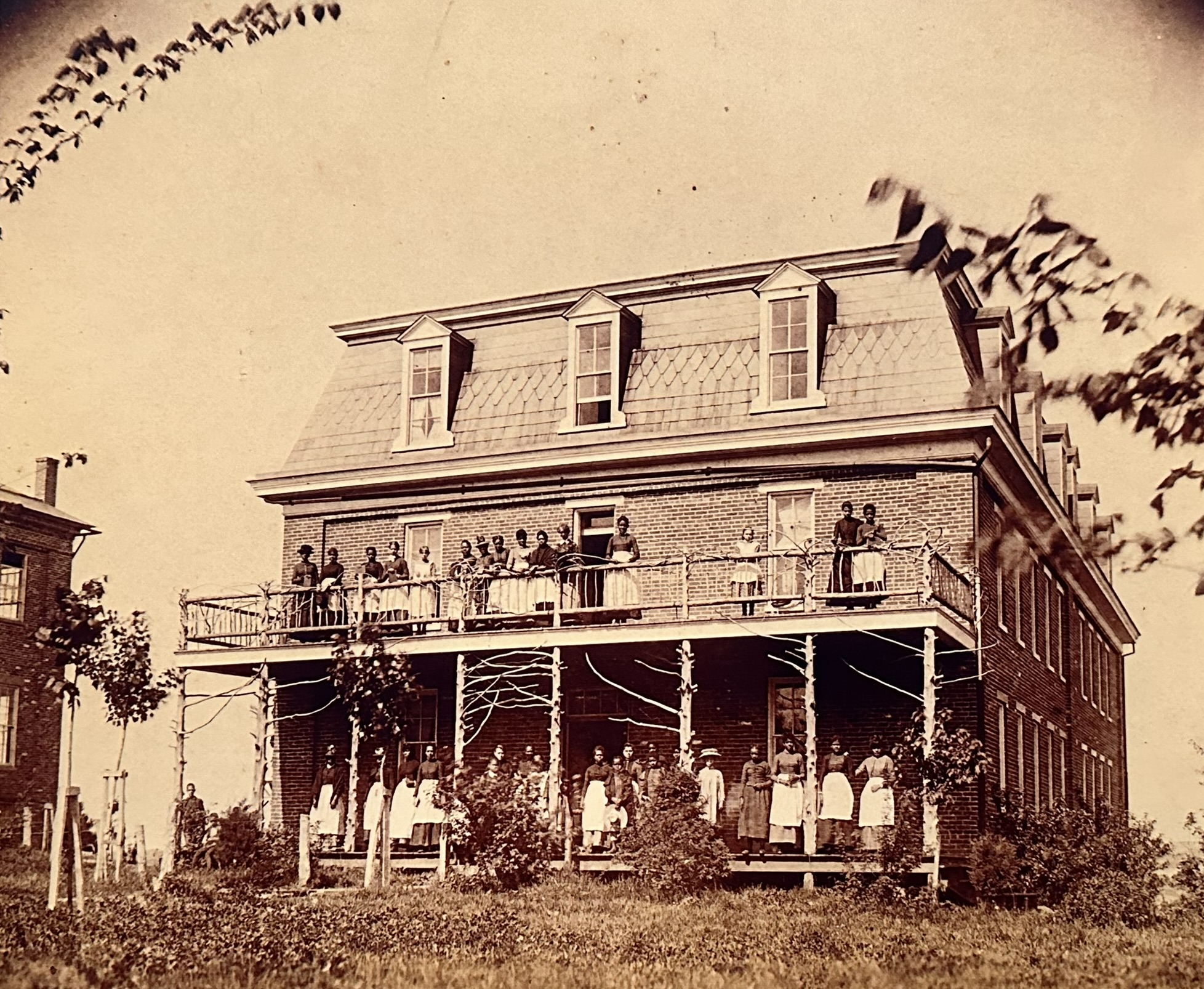
Storer College, photographed sometime between 1870–1890

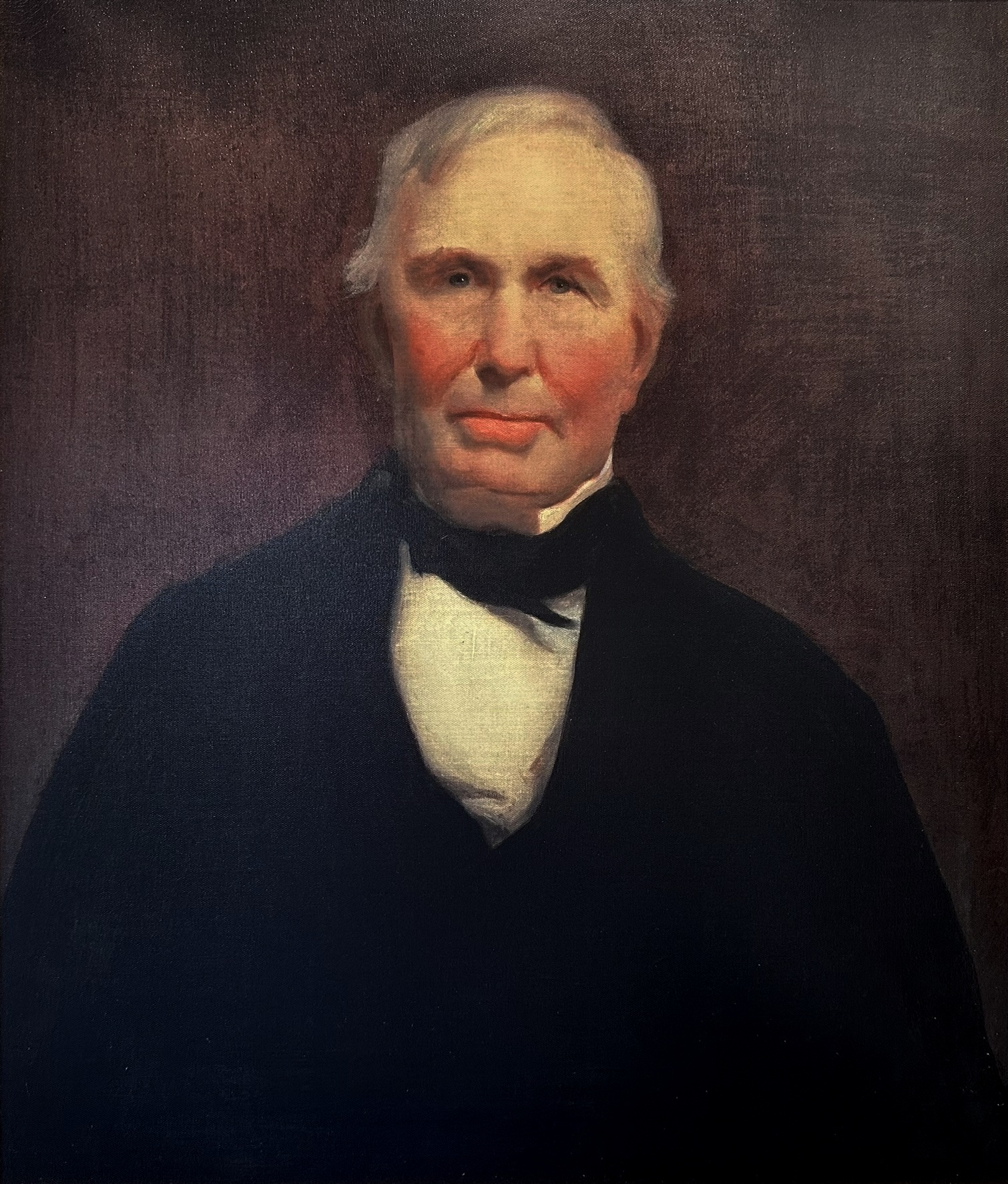
Portrait of Thomas Glass (19th century), Edward Caledon Bruce

Portrait of Alexander W. Davis (1902), Charles Franklin Moss

== See also ==
- List of botanical gardens and arboretums in the United States
