= Ferdinand Richardt =

Danish-American painter

Joachim Ferdinand Richardt
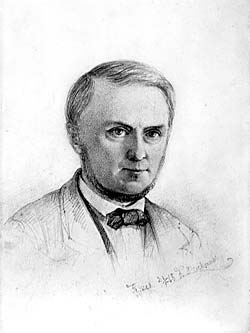
- Self portrait, 1868
- Born: 10 April 1819; Brede, Denmark
- Died: 29 October 1895 (aged 76); Oakland, California
- Known for: Painting
- Spouse: Sophia Schneider née Linnemann

Joachim Ferdinand Richardt (10 April 1819 – 29 October 1895) was a Danish-American artist. In Denmark he is mostly known for his lithographs of castles and manor houses. After emigrating to the United States he specialized in paintings of Niagara Falls and other landscapes.

== Life ==
Ferdinand Richardt, the son of Johan Joachim Richardt and Johanne Frederikke née Bohse, was born in Brede, north of Copenhagen in 1819. His father ran the inn/company store at the Brede factory. In 1832 the family relocated to nearby Ørholm to operate the inn at the paper-factory there. In 1839, they moved to Copenhagen.

Richardt became briefly a carpenter's apprentice in 1835, but soon decided on a career in fine art, following the lead of his brother Carl. Beginning in 1836 Richardt studied at the Royal Danish Academy of Art under the architect and designer Gustav Friedrich Hetsch, the historical painter J. L. Lund and the classical sculptor Bertel Thorvaldsen. Richardt was awarded the Academy's small and large silver medals in 1839 and 1840, respectively.

In 1847, he received a five-year stipend from the crown, on the condition that he deliver one architectural and one landscape painting each year to the royal collection. Between 1855 and 1859 he visited in the United States. He maintained a studio in New York City while traveling during the summers to Niagara Falls and to various destinations east of the Mississippi River.

After returning to Denmark, Richardt married the widow Sophia Schneider née Linnemann (1831–1888) in 1862. They traveled for part of a year in southern Europe, and from 1863 they lived for a period in England. In February 1864, Queen Victoria invited Richardt to display his art work to the court at Windsor Castle.

In 1872 and 1873, Richardt sold many of his accumulated paintings and lithographs before emigrating to the United States with his family. They lived first in the town of Niagara Falls, N.Y., where the artist again produced canvases depicting the great waterfall and the surrounding area. In 1875, the Richardts moved to San Francisco, and finally in 1876 to Oakland. For the remaining twenty years of his life Richardt was active as a painter of California landscapes with a concentration on the San Francisco Bay Area. He exhibited and sold his works in San Francisco until at least 1887. At the same time he taught drawing privately.

He died during 1895 in Oakland, California. At his death, Richardt left a daughter, Johanna (1862–1897), and a stepson, Joost Schneider.

== Paintings ==
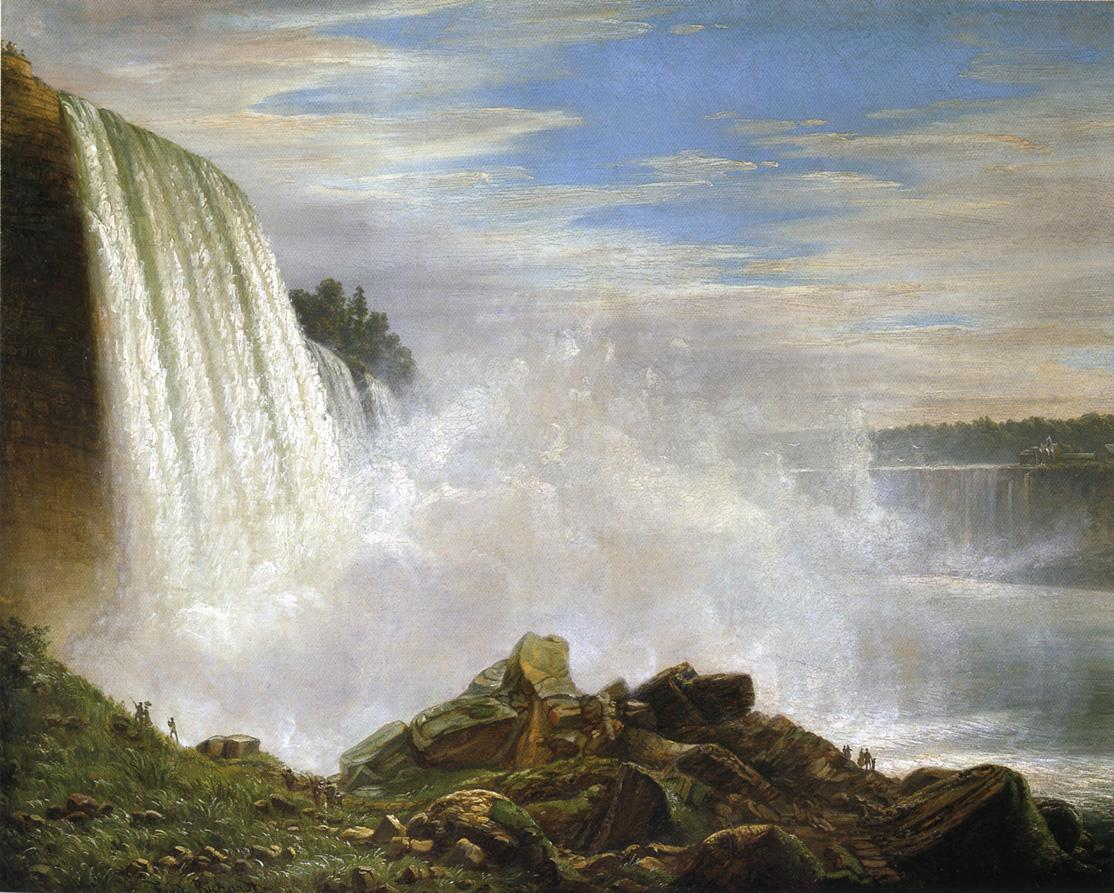
View Of Niagara Falls

Richardt created hundreds of oil paintings, mostly of landscapes, castles, manors, and various tourist attractions. He was a recognized painter in his own lifetime. Today, his paintings are held and exhibited by museums and other public institutions in the United States and Denmark; two hang in The White House, Washington, D.C.

Richardt's 1856 painting Niagara Falls was chosen to be the backdrop for the customary luncheon following the Second inauguration of Barack Obama in Statuary Hall. New York Senator Charles Schumer, the Chair of the Joint Congressional Committee on Inaugural Ceremonies, stated why he chose the painting: "For me as a New Yorker, Niagara Falls never fails to inspire a tremendous awe for the natural beauty of our great country. Then and now, the mighty falls symbolize the grandeur, power and possibility of America."

== Drawings and Lithographs ==
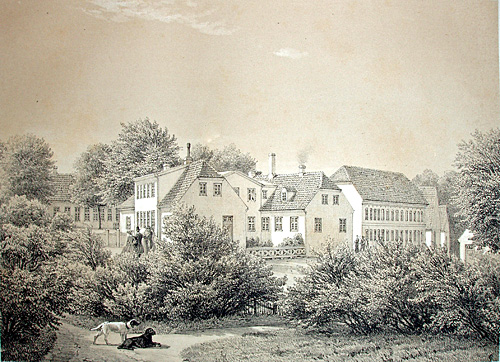
Klintholm Manor, from Pictures of Danish Manors

During the 1840s, '50s, and '60s, Richardt travelled in Denmark and Sweden, and made numerous drawings of manor houses and estates. These were lithographed with the best techniques of the time, and published along with descriptions by well-known historians in the books:

- Views of Danish Manors (Prospecter af danske Herregaarde), 80 portfolios 1844–68 showing a total of 240 manor houses. Republished with condensed text in 1976.
- Danish Churches, Castles, Manors and Memorials (Danske Kirker, Slotte, Herregaarde og Mindesmærker), 12 portfolios 1867–68 with a total of 56 pictures.
- Scanian Manors (Skånska herregårdar), 24 portfolios 1852–63, with a total of 78 pictures.
- Manors in Södermanland (Herregårdar uti Södermanland), 12 portfolios 1864-69 with a total of 57 pictures, some in color.

Richardt drew a vast number of pictures besides those published. These served as studies for his hundreds of oil paintings and for other print works. At his death, more than 1,000 Danish and American drawings passed to his daughter, and later to his stepson. The drawings were considered to be lost, until the 1990s when American scholar and cultural historian Melinda Young Stuart located them in the possession of Justine van Hemert Keller, the grandchild of Richardt's stepson. Over 500 of the original drawings, on which Richardt's paintings and lithographs were based, are preserved in the archives of Denmark's Nationalmuseet, a gift of the artist's great-granddaughter. Other drawings are held at the Oakland Museum of California, the M. H. de Young Memorial Museum, and elsewhere.

In 2003, more than 100 of the newly found drawings were reproduced, along with other works by Richardt in the book Danish Manorhouses and America (see below). A copy of this book was presented as a gift by the Danish prime minister's wife to the American First Lady when she came to Copenhagen on an official visit.

In 2007, 55 of Richardt's American drawings were exhibited at the Munson-Williams-Proctor Arts Institute; a catalogue was published (see below). The exhibit later traveled to the Grand Rapids Art Museum, where it was on view during the summer of 2008.

== Gallery ==
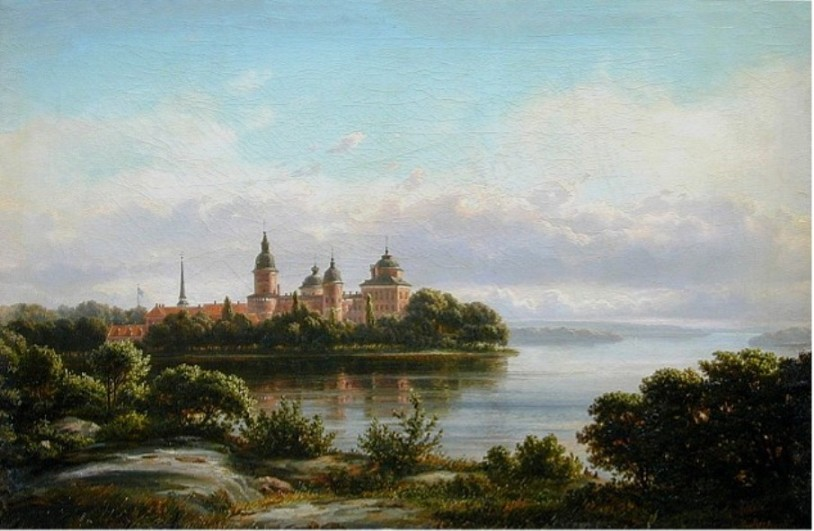
A summer day at Castle Gripsholm (1869)

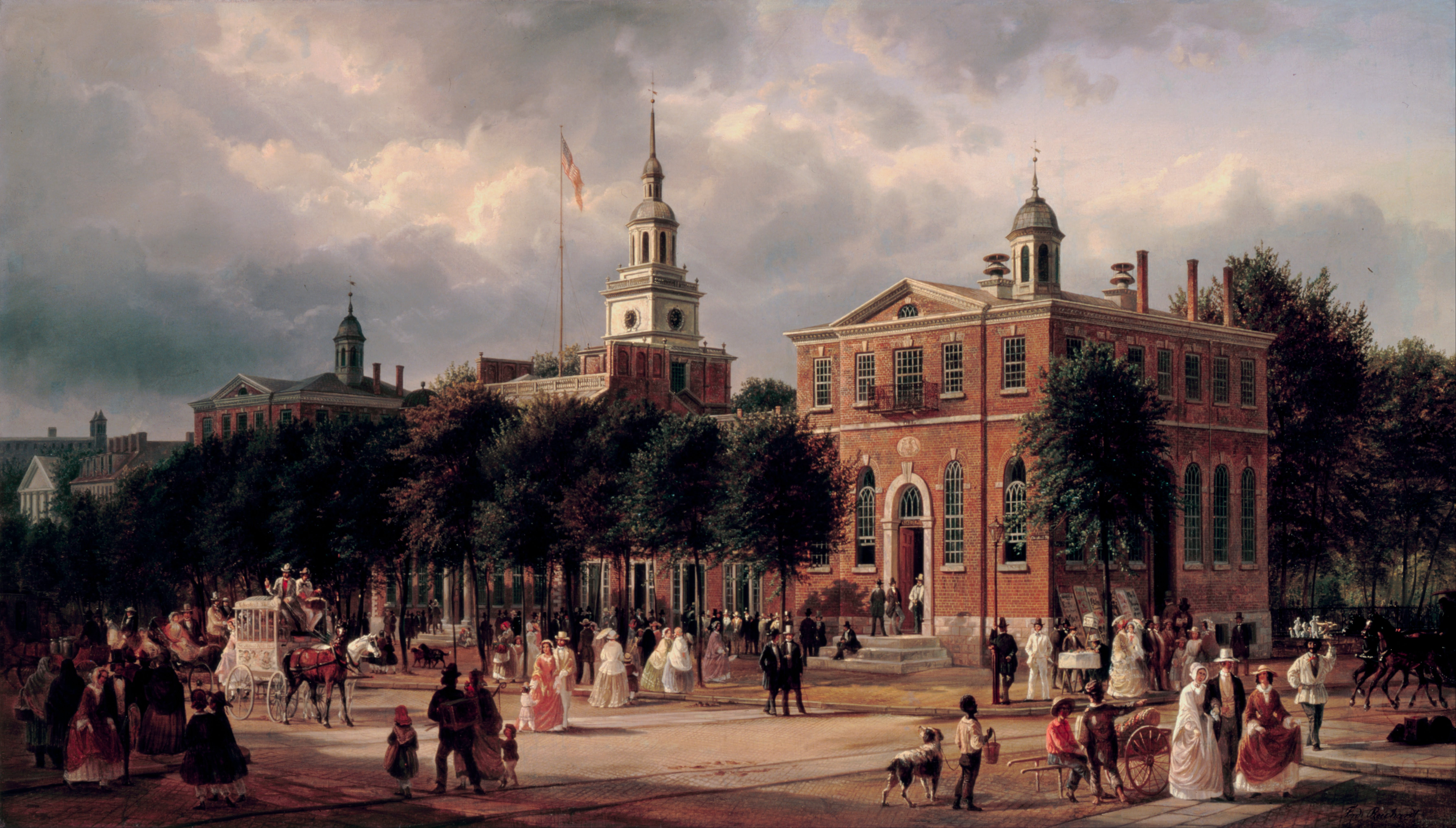
Independence Hall in Philadelphia, c. 1858–1863 (White House)

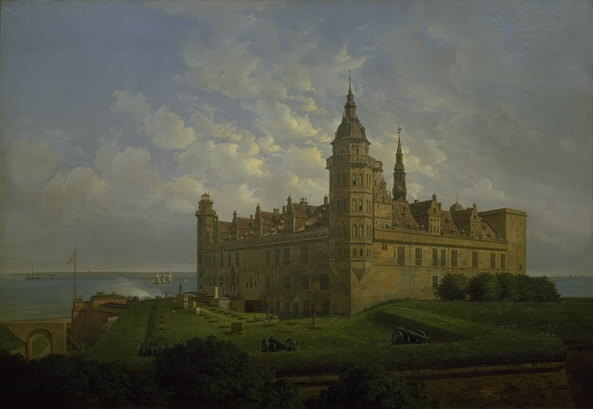
Kronborg set fra nordbastionen (National Gallery of Denmark)

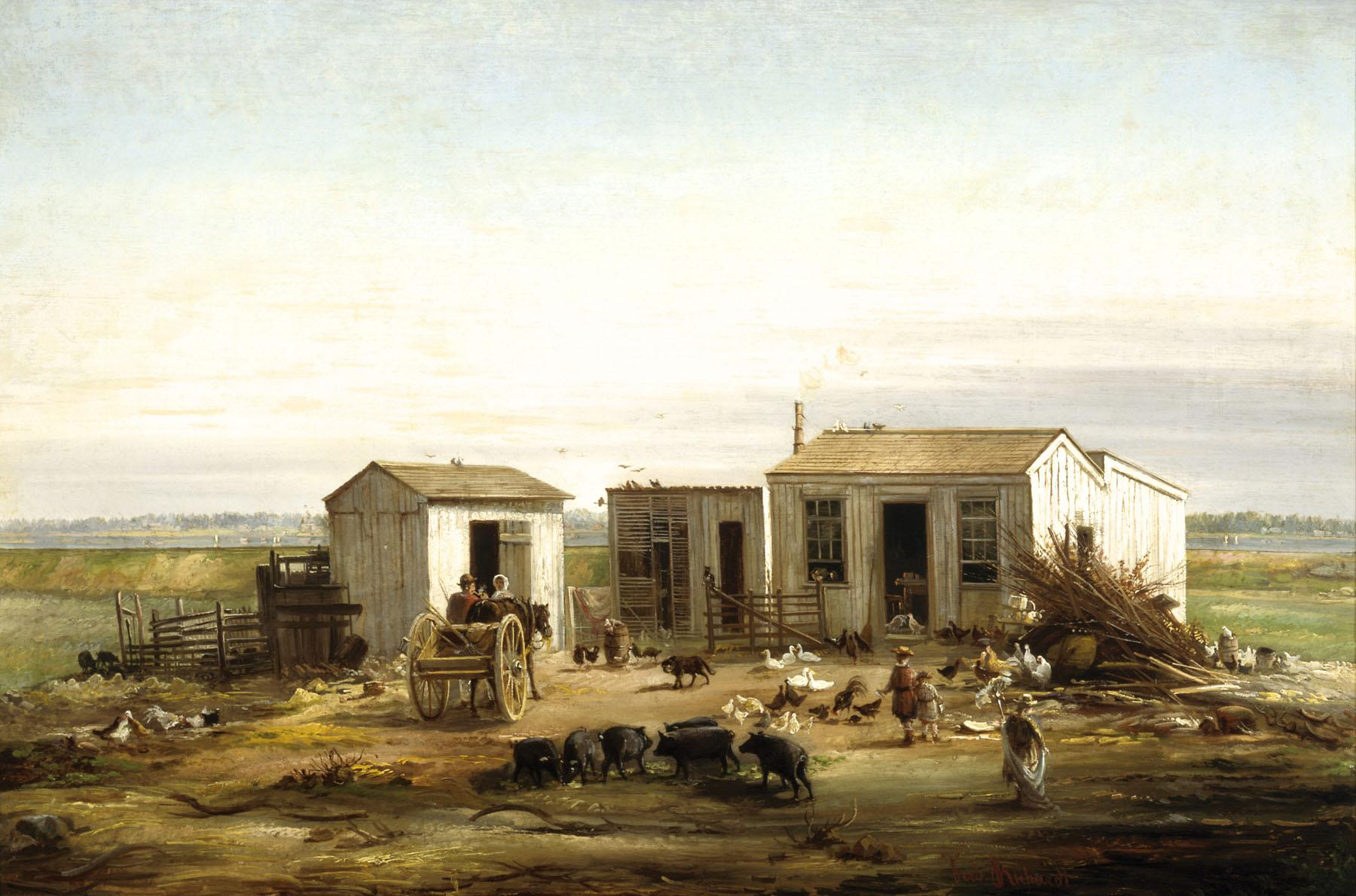
Oakland Estuary (Oakland Museum of California)

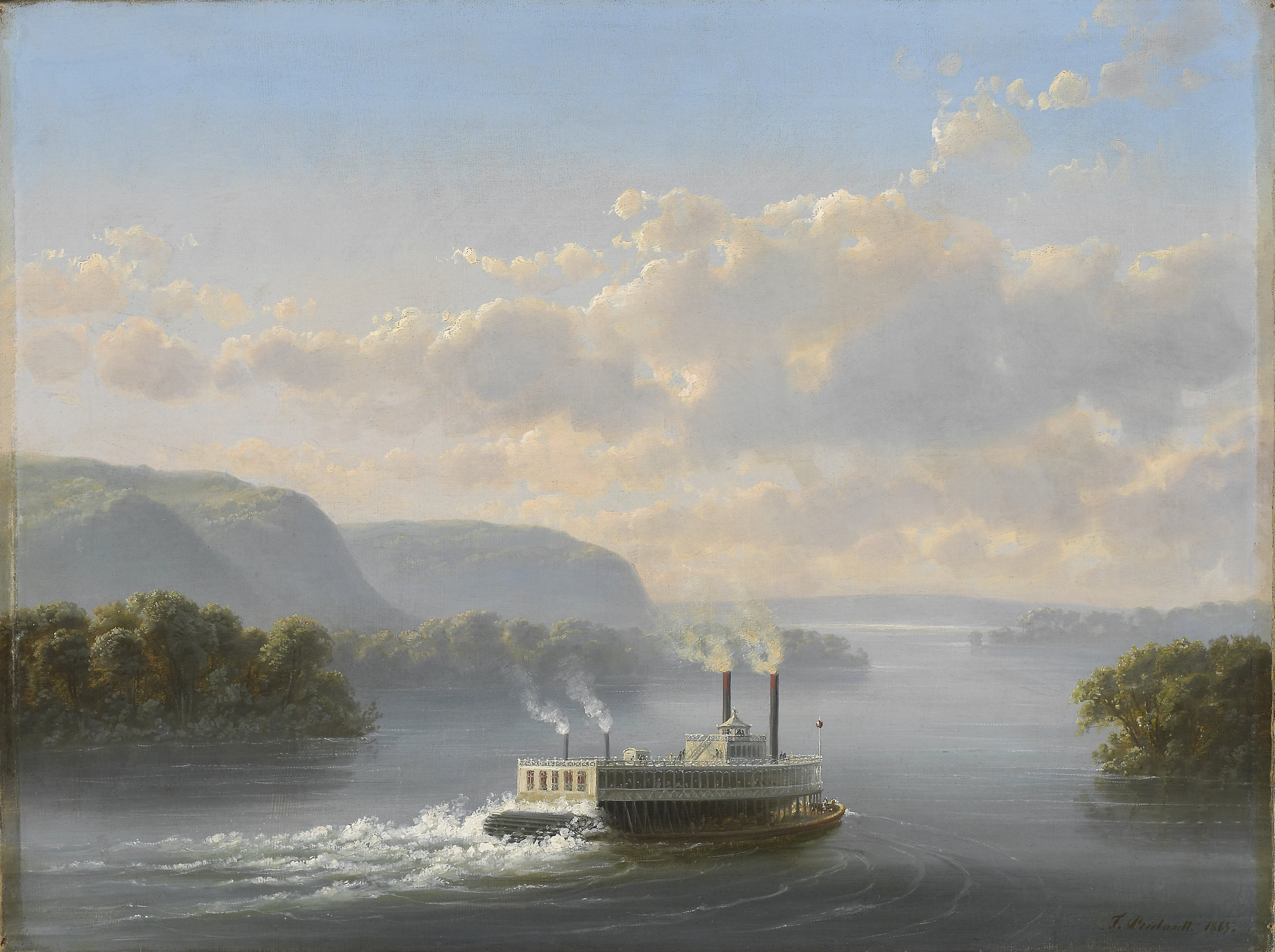
Steamwheeler on the Upper Mississippi, 1865 (Minneapolis Institute of Art)

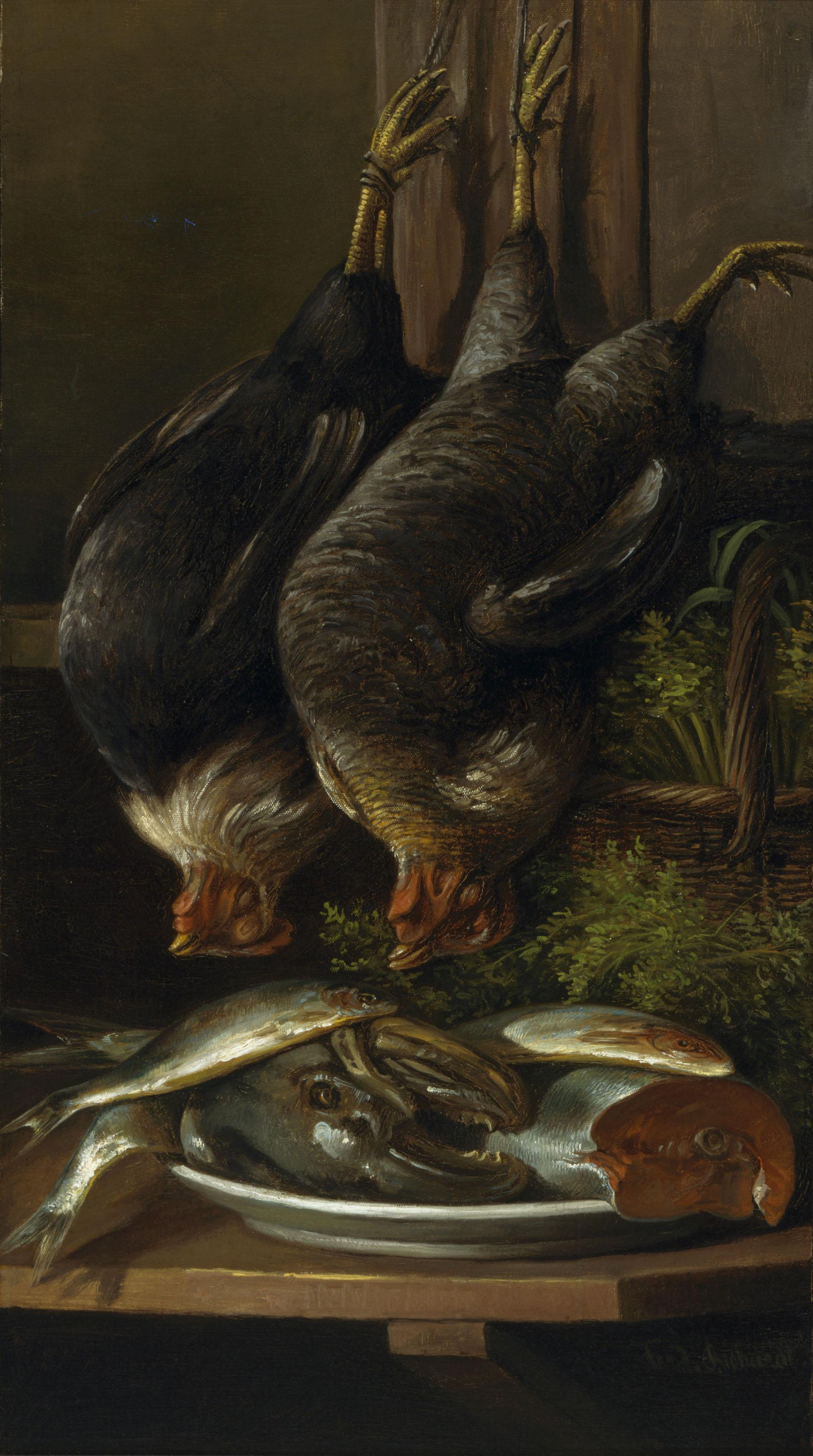
Still Life with Chickens and Fish (Oakland Museum of California)

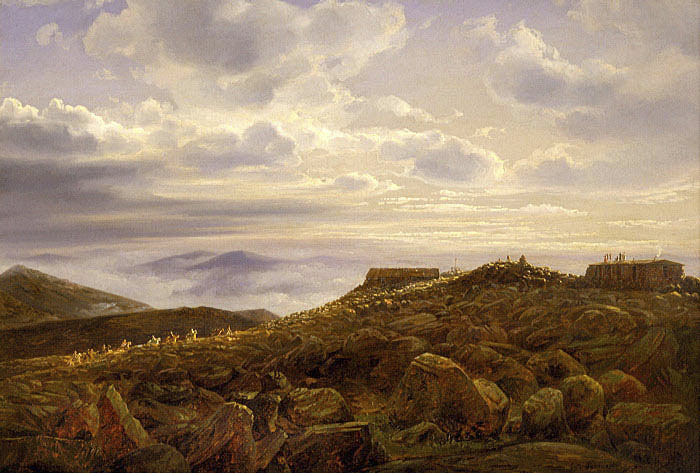
Summit of Mount Washington in the White Mountains (1857)

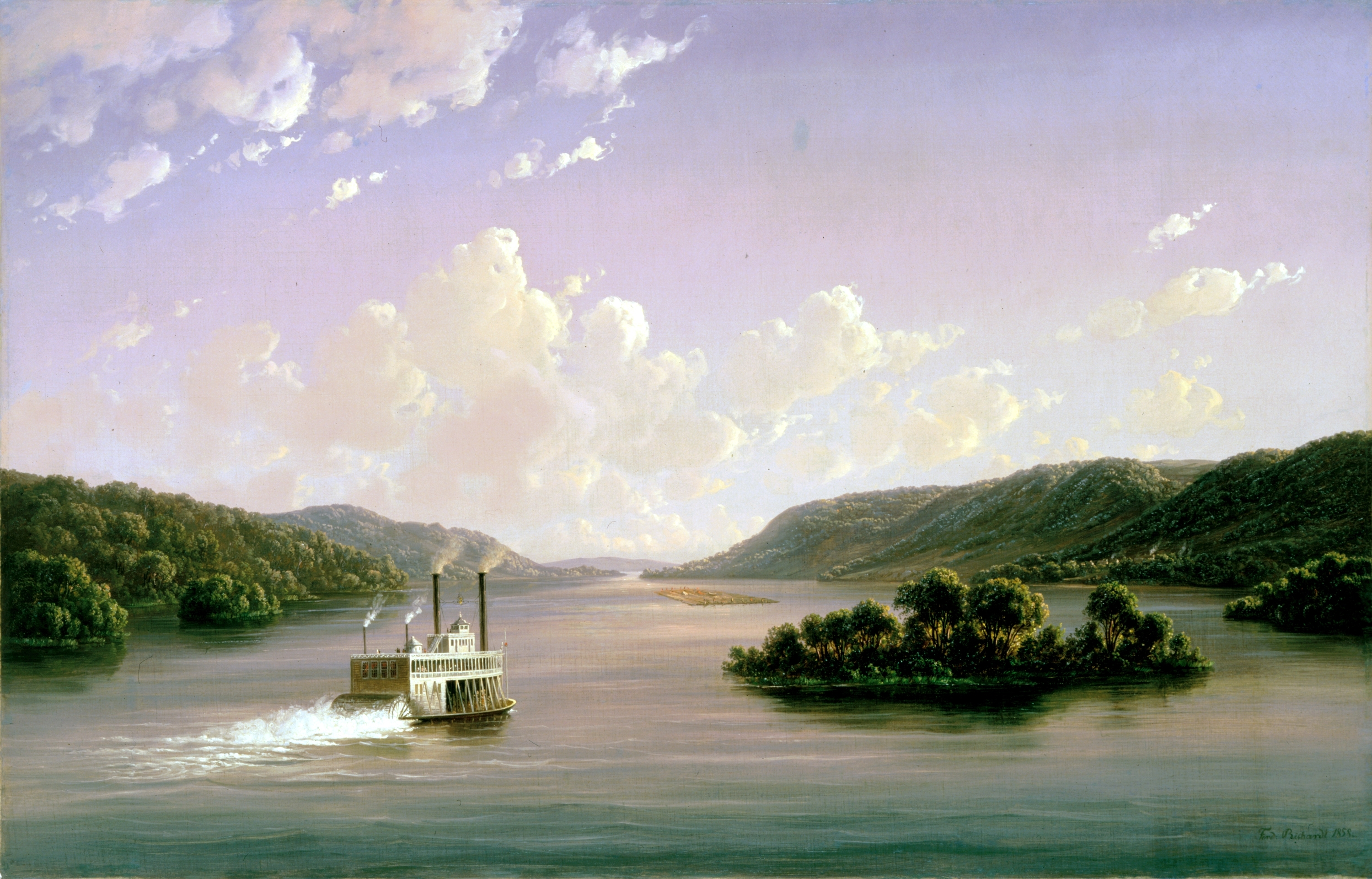
View on the Mississippi Fifty-Seven Miles Below St. Anthony Falls, Minneapolis (1858) (White House Historical Association)

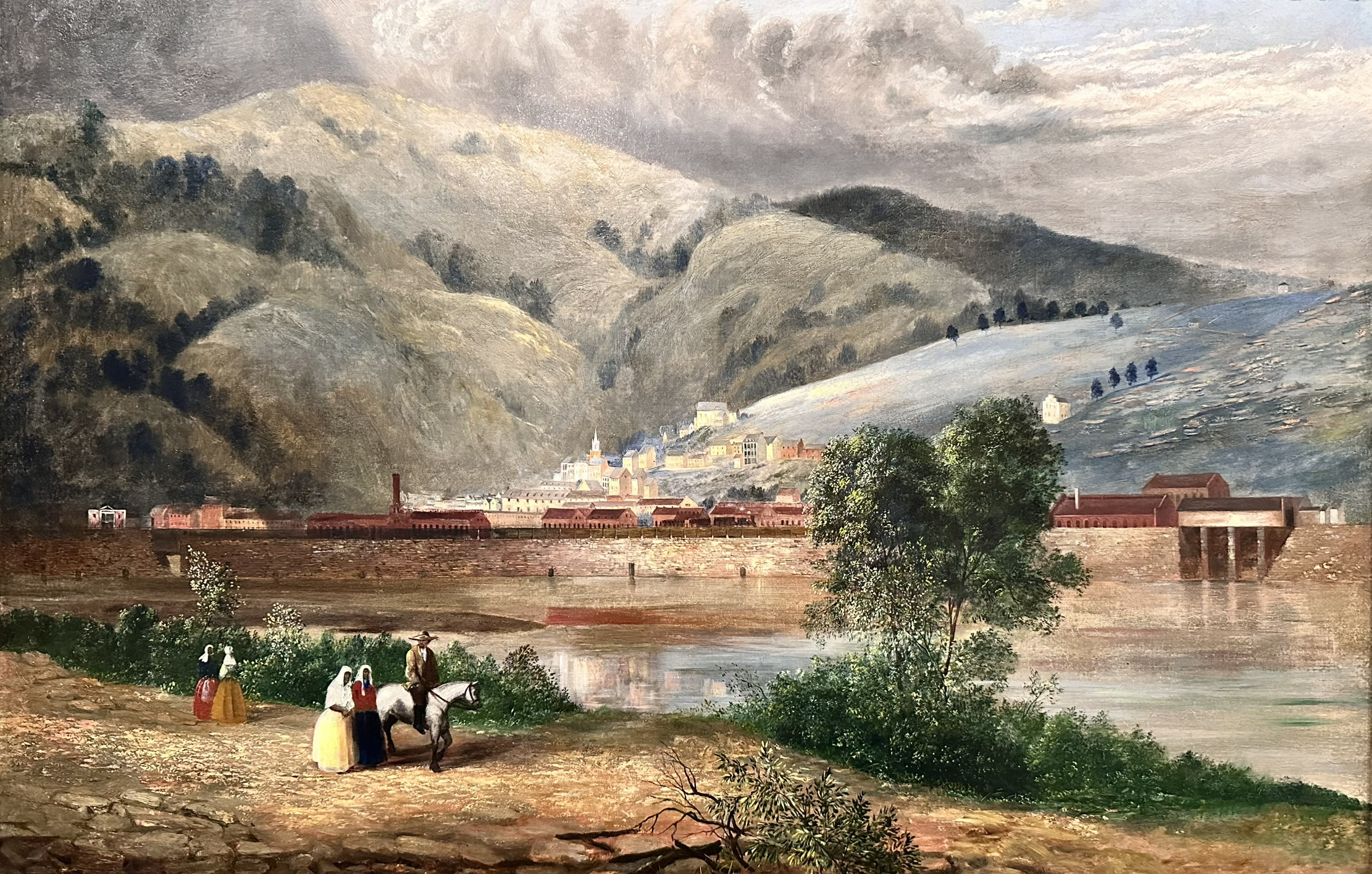
Harper's Ferry, Virginia (1859), Museum of the Shenandoah Valley

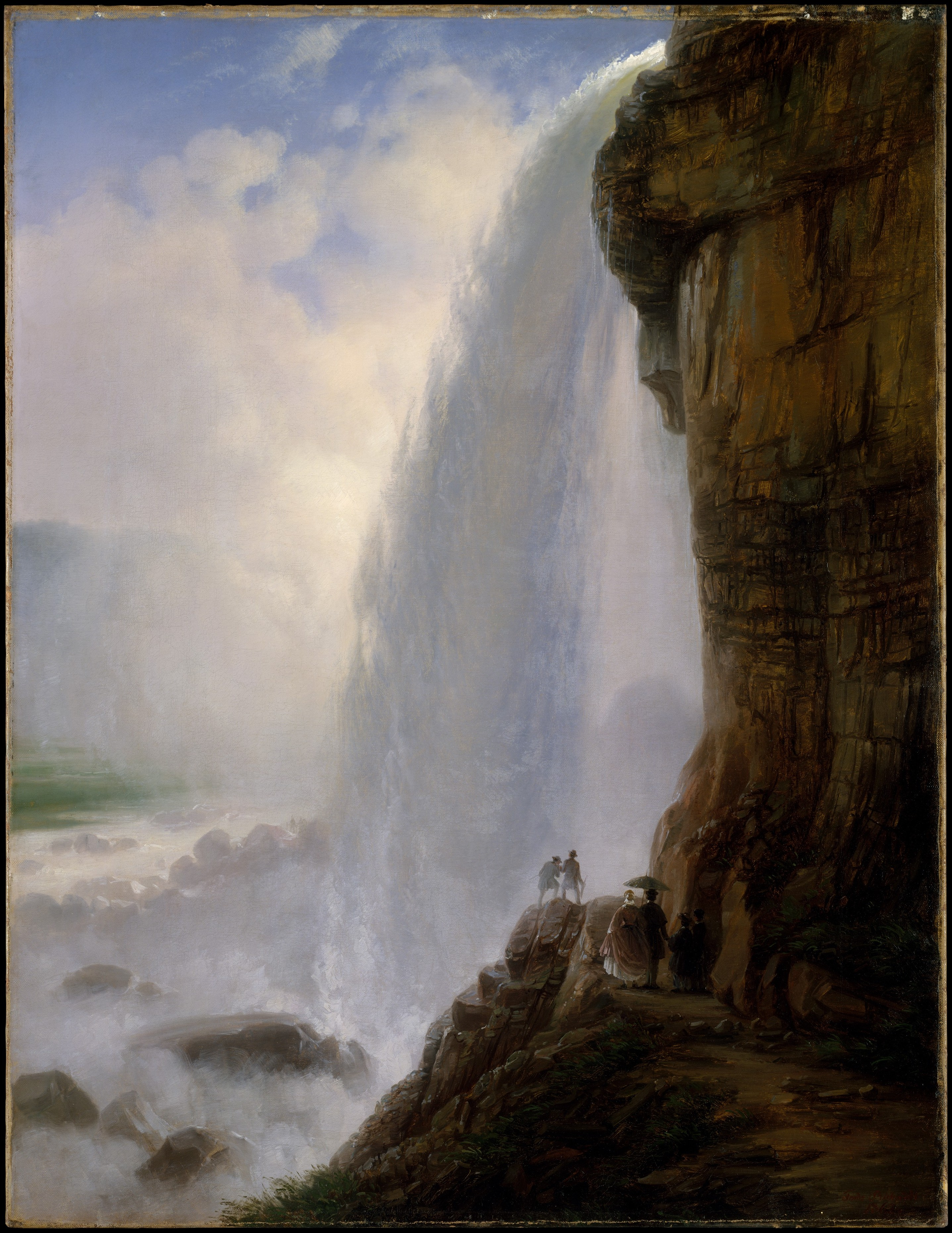
Underneath Niagara Falls (1862), Metropolitan Museum of Art

== Other Sources ==
- Paul D. Schweizer; Melinda Young Stuart, Ferdinand Richardt: Drawings of America, 1855-1859 (Utica, NY: Munson-Williams-Proctor Arts Institute Museum of Art, 2007). ISBN 0-915895-31-5.
- Melinda Young Stuart; Niels Peter Stilling: Danish Manorhouses and America, Landscape Art of Ferdinand Richardt (1819-1895) (published by Søllerød Museum, Denmark, 2003) ISBN 87-88792-45-5. (Danish title: Danske Herregårde og Amerika). The text by Stilling is in Danish, that by Stuart in English.
- Melinda Young Frye: Joachim Ferdinand Richardt (1819-1895), a Danish Artist in the American Landscape (1855-1859) (M.A. thesis, George Washington University, Washington DC, 1993)
