= Julian Wood Glass Jr. =

- Born: February 7, 1910; Little Rock, Arkansas, US
- Died: February 27, 1992 (aged 82); New York City, US
- Resting place: Nowata Memorial Park Cemetery, Nowata, Oklahoma
- Education: Westminster College (Missouri), Fulton, Missouri, Harvard Graduate School of Design
- Partner: R. Lee Taylor

Julian Wood Glass Jr. (February 7, 1910 – February 27, 1992) was a businessman, art collector, and philanthropist who created the Glen Burnie Gardens with R. Lee Taylor. He also ensured the preservation of Glen Burnie Historic House, now part of the Museum of the Shenandoah Valley. Glass Jr. was chairman and director of Panhandle Producing Co. of San Antonio, Texas; director of Pinto Well Servicing, Paladin Pipe Line Co., and Reliance Development Co., and president and director of North Star Petroleum Co.

Glass received his undergraduate degree from Westminster College in Fulton, Missouri and attended graduate school at the Harvard Graduate School of Design. He was also a member of Beta Theta Pi fraternity.

Glass Jr. was active in New York's social scene and was a member of the Metropolitan Opera Club, the Metropolitan Opera Golden Horseshoe, the River Club and the Metropolitan Club. He also remained active in Oklahoma, supporting the Tulsa Opera, Tulsa Ballet, and Tulsa Philharmonic. In his hometown of Nowata, he supported the hospital, library, Chamber of Commerce, 4-H, and was a lifelong member of Nowata's First Presbyterian Church.

In 1947, Glass Jr. met R. Lee Taylor in New York City shortly after the latter's discharge from the army, and the two became close friends, and eventually committed partners. Glass Jr. hired Taylor to assist with refurbishment and preservation of Glen Burnie. In 1952, Glass Jr. inherited his father's shares in Glen Burnie and Rose Hill in Winchester, Virginia, and over the next three years purchased or inherited the remaining shares of both estates, which would require serious financial investment. Together Glass Jr. and Taylor created six acres of gardens around the house. After the relationship of the two men ended in the 1970s, Glass Jr. continued to entertain at Glen Burnie and Taylor managed the site, living on premises.

Glass Jr. established the Glass-Glen Burnie Foundation to assure the preservation of Glen Burnie Historic House and Gardens, Rose Hill, and his collection of English and American paintings and decorative arts. Much of his art collection is on display at the Museum of the Shenandoah Valley.

== Sources ==
- "Tulsa Opera supporter Glass dies". Tulsa World. February 27, 1992.
- Lee, Marge (2003). The Gardens of Glen Burnie. The Glass-Glen Burnie Museum Inc., Winchester, VA. ISBN 0-9743109-0-5.
