= Ruth E. Hodge =

American archivist, author, educator and community activist

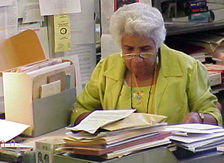
- Ruth E. Hodge, archivist, Pennsylvania State Archives, c. 2000
- Born: Ruth Evelyn Perry; April 27, 1937 (age 89); Fluvanna County, Virginia, United States
- Occupation: Archivist
- Known for: Guide to African American Resources at the Pennsylvania State Archives (Pennsylvania Historical and Museum Commission, 2000, ISBN 978-0-8927-1087-4).
- Spouse: Marcus Lee Hodge (1930–2017)
- Parent(s): Rev. Houston Bryan Perry, Sr. (1894–1983) and Ruth Van Buren (Morgan) Perry (1904–1998)

Ruth Evelyn Hodge is an American archivist, author, educator, and community activist who has furthered the advancement of African-American and United States military history research and writing during the 20th and early 21st centuries. "African-Americans played a great part in building America," she said during a newspaper interview in 2000. "The more people know, the better they understand and the better they get along."

== Formative years ==
Born on April 27, 1937, in Fluvanna County, Virginia, Ruth Evelyn (Perry) Hodge is the daughter of the late Rev. Houston Bryan Perry, Sr. (1894–1983) and Ruth Van Buren (Morgan) Perry (1904–1998).

According to news reporter Pamilla Saylor, Ruth Perry was an avid student of history from the time of her early childhood "when she was taught that Pennsylvania was a 'salvation to the Underground Railroad.'" The topics she chose to write about in school frequently addressed important, but often overlooked moments of African-American history. "Most members of Union Baptist [where her father served as the pastor when she was young] never knew Ruth's given name because at birth she had been affectionately dubbed with the moniker 'Precious' by her mom," according to curators at the Scottsville Museum in Scottsville, Virginia.

In 1953, Ruth relocated with her parents and siblings to Williamsport, Pennsylvania, where her father had been hired to become pastor of the Shiloh Baptist Church. A 1954 graduate of Williamsport High School, she went on to complete her bachelor's degree in Business Administration at Lycoming College in 1958, and then began her own family when she wed Marcus Lee Hodge (1930–2017) on September 26, 1959. A native of Carlisle, Pennsylvania and son of late Peter Andrew and Rachel Ellen (Humphreys) Hodge, her husband served in the U.S. Air Force and was later employed as a draftsman by Gannett Fleming and the Pennsylvania Department of Transportation. The couple, who had met at the Shiloh Baptist Church in Williamsport, Pennsylvania, where her father was serving as pastor, became the parents of two children: Perrianne and Mark Andrew.

In 1971, Ruth E. Hodge received her master's degree in library science at Shippensburg University.

== Professional life and community service ==
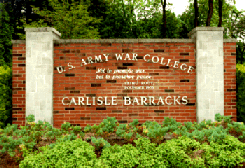
Front gate, U.S. Army War College (Carlisle Barracks).

From the early 1960s through the early 1990s, Ruth E. Hodge utilized her strategic planning and archival skills to assist the United States Army with the documentation and preservation of its history. While employed in the U.S. Army War College Library (Carlisle Barracks) from 1960 to 1980, she was also a member of the Medical Science Liaison Society at Shippensburg University (1971).

She was then employed by the U.S. Army Military History Institute (Carlisle Barracks) from 1980 to 1993. During this period of her service, she also served as an Equal Opportunity counselor for her employer, and taught classes at Shippensburg University as an adjunct professor from 1981 to 1982.

As the U.S. Army prepared to commemorate the 50th anniversary of World War II, she was drafted to help with research, but soon realized that there was scant information "on blacks when it came to Army histories and school textbooks." After presenting a day-long conference for her colleagues in 1992 to raise awareness about this issue and pressing her superiors to do more, she was given the authority to organize a multi-day conference, which then led to invitations for her to present additional lectures nationwide.

She also assisted authors with a variety of research queries during her tenure with the U.S. Army, including Robert F. Jefferson, who later thanked Ruth and others from the "United States Army Military History Institute at Carlisle Barracks ... for their generosity and resourcesfulness" via the "Acknowledgements" section of his 2008 book, Fighting for Hope: African American troops of the 93rd Infantry Division in World War II and postwar America.

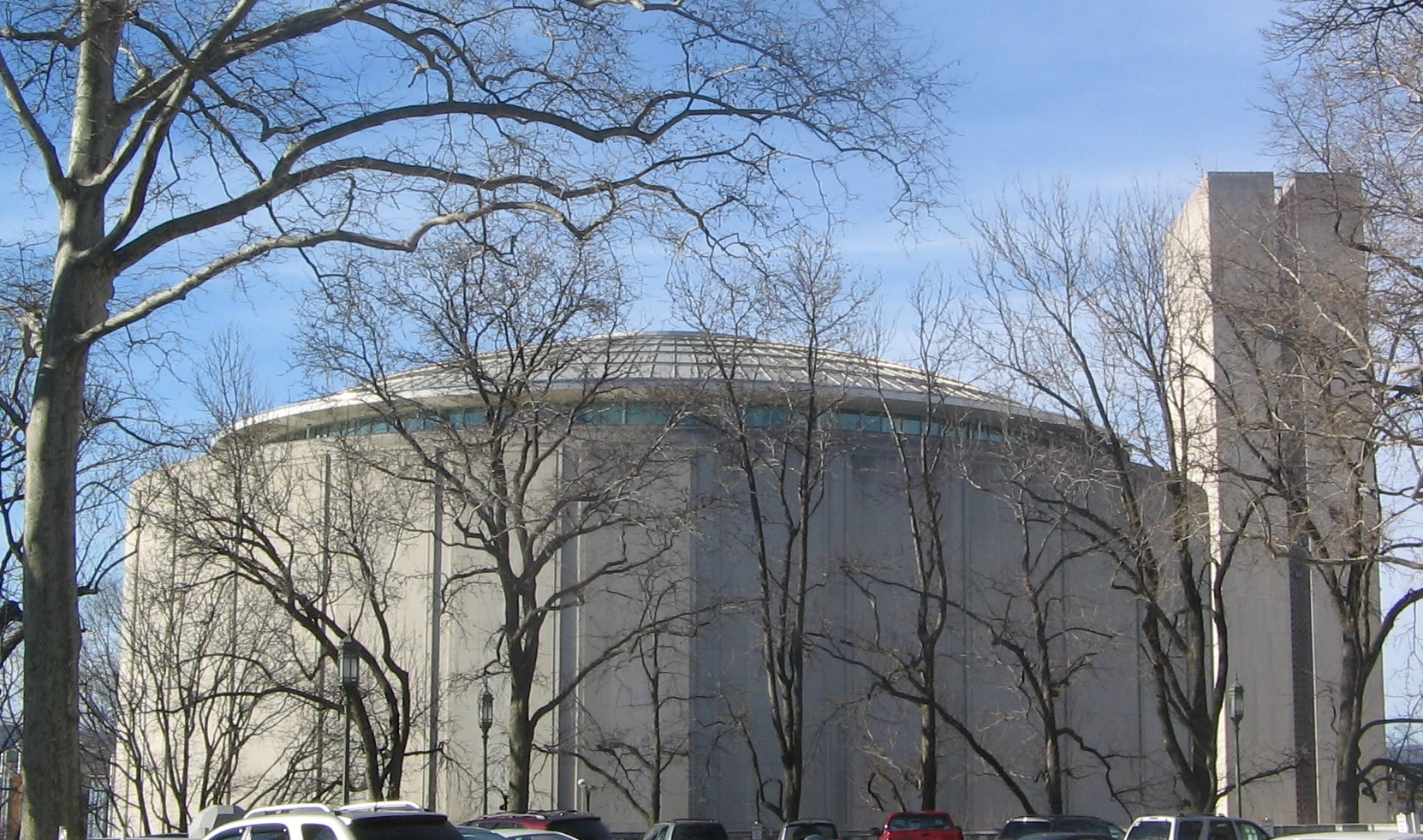
The State Museum of Pennsylvania, and the Pennsylvania State Archives tower (right) in Harrisburg, Pennsylvania, March 2010 (GFDL, CC-BY-SA).

Hired by the Pennsylvania State Archives in Harrisburg, Pennsylvania in 1993 as an archivist, she became the Archives' African-American specialist. In 1997, she also became a consultant to the Pennsylvania Military Museum in Boalsburg, and was able to secure grant funds to support the museum's launch of a program to record the oral histories of African-Americans who had served in the U.S. military during World War II. By the following year, she had also joined a steering committee which had been formed to plan special events related to the celebration of Cumberland County's 250th anniversary.

As the 21st century dawned, she published her book, Guide to African American Resources at the Pennsylvania State Archives. According to news reporter Michael Bupp, Hodge "spent six years digging through 69,000 feet of archived documents to compile" the materials for her book during the summer of 2000. During her research, she confirmed the enrollment of more than 10,000 African-American soldiers who fought for the Union during the American Civil War. Interviewed in 2000, she recalled:

I found evidence that nearly 20 men from Carlisle served with the 54th Massachusetts Regiment.... It wasn't until Pennsylvania really got into a tight situation and needed as many troops as possible that Gov. Andrew Curtin noticed the number of blacks heading elsewhere to enlist.

In 2001, she delivered a lecture on the life and work of Charles Franklin Moss, the early 20th-century Carlisle photographer who reportedly also created the design for Pennsylvania's state flag. The program was presented at the Shiloh Missionary Baptist Church as part of its 133rd anniversary celebrations in November of that year.

Remaining active during her retirement, she presented a program regarding "Carlisle's African American Civil War Soldiers" at the Bosler Free Library in that city in November 2002 as part of the "One Book, Two Counties" program sponsored by Cumberland and Dauphin counties.

In 2005, she played a key role in Carlisle's celebration of National African American History Month, helping to coordinate a February program at the Shiloh Missionary Baptist Church with the theme, "The Niagara Movement: Black Protest Reborn 1905-2005" for which Sheila Y. Flemming, dean of the School of Social Sciences and professor of history at Bethune-Cookman College in Daytona Beach, Florida, served as the keynote speaker.

She also spoke at the 2009 dedication of the historical marker for one of the first religious institutions to be built west of Pennsylvania's Susquehanna River – the Bethel A.M.E. Church at 131 East Pomfret Street in Carlisle – a church which also played a key role in the operations of the Underground Railroad during the American Civil War. Other presenters at the May 9 program included: Pennsylvania State Senator Pat Vance; the city's mayor, Kirk Wilson; the church's pastor, Rev. Troy Lynn Carr; and Barbara Harris, the executive director of the Pennsylvania Historical and Museum Commission.

That same year, she and her husband celebrated their 50th wedding anniversary during a reaffirmation service which was held at the Shiloh Missionary Baptist Church in Carlisle. Religiously, she and her family have been longtime, active members of that church. In addition to serving her congregation as a deaconess and church historian, she founded the institution's Robert C. Gaskill Library, naming it in honor of the first African-American appointed as commandant of the U.S. Army War College.

Having lost her father and mother in 1983 and 1998, respectively, she also survived the deaths of her brother, Houston Bryan Perry, Jr., and husband, Marcus L. Hodge. Her brother died on August 9, 2014, and was laid to rest at the Cumberland Valley Memorial Gardens following a Homegoing Service at the Shiloh Missionary Baptist Church on August 19. She was then widowed by her husband in 2017 when he died at the age of 87 at their home in Carlisle on July 13. Following funeral services at the Shiloh Missionary Baptist Church on July 19, he was laid to rest with full military honors at the Cumberland Valley Memorial Gardens.

== Awards ==
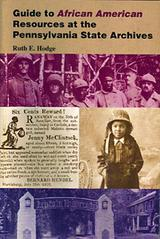
Front cover, Ruth E. Hodge's Guide to African American Resources at the Pennsylvania State Archives (published, 2000).

Ruth E. Hodge has been the recipient of multiple honors during her lifetime, including the:

- Outstanding Alumnus, Lycoming College (1983); and
- Black Women's Historians Award, Black Women Historians, Washington, D.C. (1993).

In addition, she was named one of "Carlisle's Finest" in 1991 by the Carlisle Evening Sentinel.

== Publications ==
- Hodge, Ruth E. Guide to African American Resources at the Pennsylvania State Archives. Harrisburg, Pennsylvania: Commonwealth of Pennsylvania, Pennsylvania Historical and Museum Commission, 2000. ISBN 978-0-8927-1087-4

She also contributed content for a variety of materials created on behalf of her employers over the years, as well as to a series of publications produced by the Cumberland County Historical Society, including: 250 Years of the Arts; Faith Communities: The Religious Heritage of Cumberland County; and Pictorial History.
