= Pennsylvania State Archives =

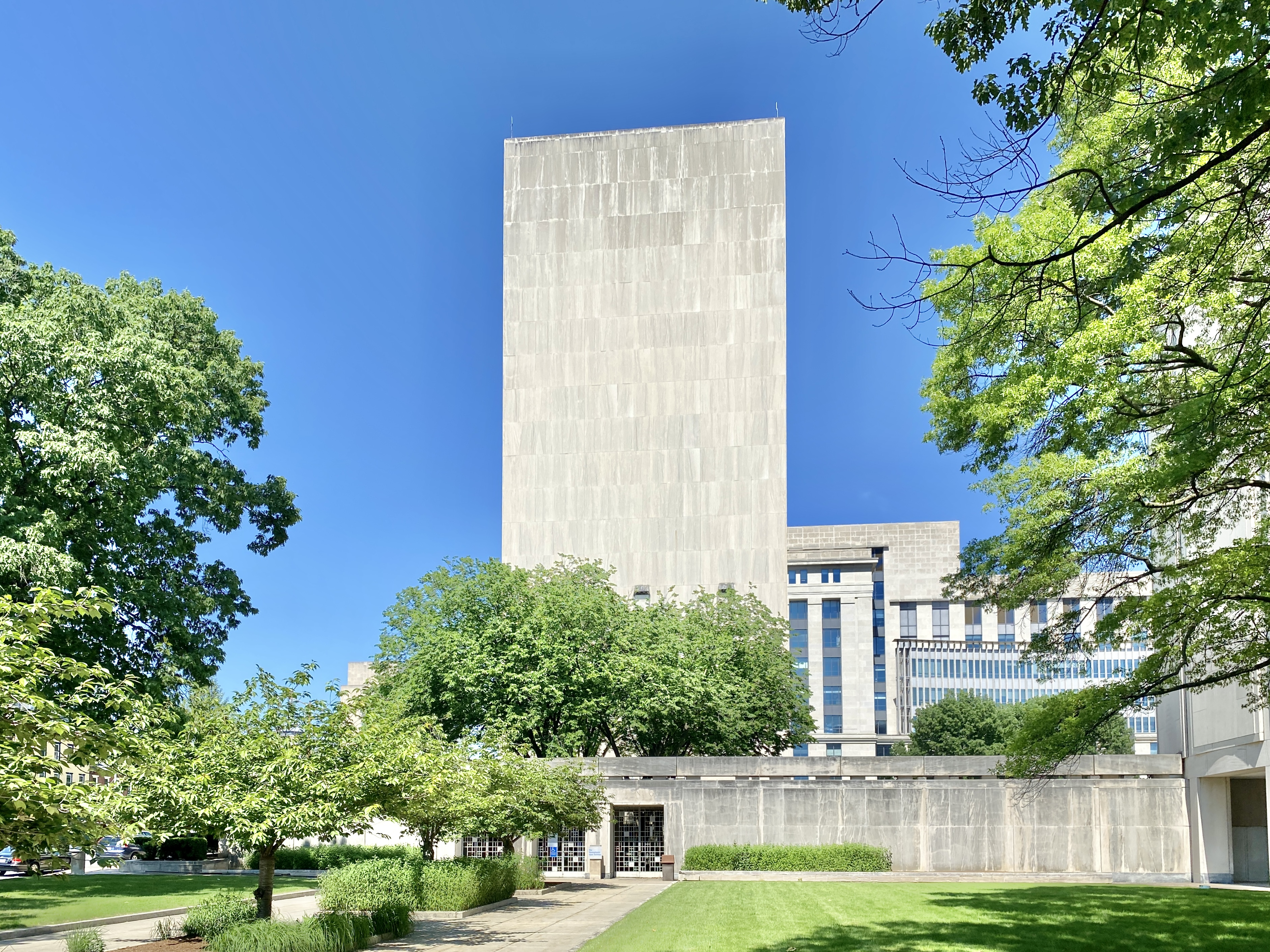
The Pennsylvania State Archives tower on the grounds of the Pennsylvania State Capitol

The Pennsylvania State Archives is the official archive for the Commonwealth of Pennsylvania, administered as part of the Pennsylvania Historical and Museum Commission. Located at 1681 N. Sixth St. in the state capital of Harrisburg, it is a part of the Pennsylvania State Capitol Complex.

== Mission ==
The primary function of the Pennsylvania State Archives is to acquire, preserve and make available for study the permanently valuable public records of the Commonwealth, with particular attention given to the records of state government. The State Archives also collects private papers relevant to Pennsylvania history.

== History ==
The State Archives was created in 1903 as the Division of Public Records in the State Library. In 1945, it was combined with the State Museum and the Pennsylvania Historical Commission to form the Pennsylvania Historical Museum Commission (PHMC). Created in 1903 as the Division of Public Records in the State Library, it was combined in 1945 with the State Museum and the Pennsylvania Historical Commission to form the Pennsylvania Historical and Museum Commission (PHMC). It was officially designated as the Bureau of the Pennsylvania State Archives within the PHMC. The original placement of the Archives in the State Library, the same arrangement used by many other states, was just an administrative convenience, but it reinforced a blurring—in the minds of the general public—of the functions of books and of “archival materials,” a term just coming into use.

The PHMC works through two divisions of the Bureau of Archives and History; the Division of Archives and Manuscripts and the Division of Archival and Records Management. The Division of Archives and Manuscripts is responsible for preserving, publicizing, and making available historical records at the Archives’ search room and responding to inquiries about its holdings. The Division of Archival and Records Management Services is responsible for appraising and scheduling records on all levels of government and helping government officers meet their responsibilities for creating and maintaining records.

== Collection ==
The State Archives collection, as of 2000, contained one hundred and sixty-five million pages of documents, seventeen thousand reels of microfilm, and one million special collection items, including photographs, maps and blueprints, motion picture rolls, and audio and video tapes covering the period 1664 to the present. It nearly filled the twenty-story Archives Tower. The temperature in the Archives Tower is maintained at 68 °F (20 °C) and humidity is kept at forty-five to fifty percent. Records are stored in acid-free folders and boxes. Among the items housed at the State Archives is the 1681 Charter from Great Britain's King Charles II to William Penn, the 1737 Walking Purchase, an 1857 photograph of the Horseshoe Curve, photographs of the ruins of Chambersburg taken in 1864, the 1878 Death Warrant for John J. Kehoe and a letter to Governor Duff relating to the 1948 Donora smog disaster. In 2018, archivists negotiated the acquisition of the original Minutes of General Assembly taken on March 16, 1779, which documented Revolutionary War-era deliberations of the Pennsylvania Assembly regarding the purchase of supplies for the Continental Army, pay rates for members of state militia units, and the pension eligibility of military widows.

== Notable personnel ==
- Cindy Bendroth, Chief, Records Services Division
- David Carmicheal, Director, Bureau of Archives and History
- Ruth E. Hodge, archivist (retired) and author, Guide to African American Resources at the Pennsylvania State Archives (Pennsylvania Historical and Museum Commission, 2000, ISBN 978-0-8927-1087-4)

== Alert November 2023 ==
- Mar 7, 2021 — The new State Archives building is expected to open to the public in late September 2023. PA State Archive Building
- From the Pennsylvania State Archives website:
- Archives Remains Closed - UPDATE The Pennsylvania State Archives has completed the move to its new facility at 1681 North Sixth Street, Harrisburg, PA, but certain systems that will be used by the public continue to be installed and tested. We expect these to be completed, and for the Archives to reopen to the public during December. Please check back for additional information and updates as the definite reopening date is finalized.
- HARC Grants Cancelled We regret that the approved 2023–24 budget for the Pennsylvania Historical & Museum Commission (PHMC) was not sufficient to fund the Historical and Archival Records Care (HARC) Grants, so the program has been cancelled.
