= Charles Franklin Moss =

African American photographer and painter

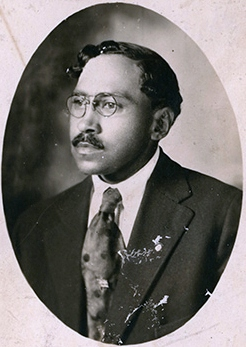
Moss in the early 1900s

Charles Franklin Moss (1878-1961) was an African American photographer and painter born in Winchester, Virginia. Moss' mother was born into slavery and his father was a mason. He showed interest in art early in his life and attended Cooper Union and the Pennsylvania Academy of the Fine Arts. He was the first African American member of the Professional Photographers of America and reportedly designed the Flag of Pennsylvania. Moss spent most of his life in Pennsylvania and his works were later featured in exhibitions. He operated photography studios in Carlisle and Harrisburg, and a painting studio in Pittsburgh. He and his second wife, Sarah Virginia Townson, raised a family of twelve children.

== Early life ==
Charles Franklin Moss was born in 1878 in Winchester, Virginia, to Thomas and Mary Moss. Thomas Winifred Moss (1835-1914) practiced masonry and was a widower, with children from his previous marriage. In 1877, he married Mary E. Johnson Ligans (1840-1926), who had been "gifted" in 1845 as a Christmas present to the Miller family. When Rebecca Miller died, in her will she freed Mary, though the latter continued working for the Millers at 209 Fairmont Avenue for the rest of her life as a paid servant.

Not much is known about Moss' education in Winchester, though his talent for painting was apparent by his early 20s. In the 1900 United States census, Moss listed his job as "artist." Moss' earliest works were often portraits of family members, including a 1902 portrait of his brother-in-law and member of Winchester's City Council, Alexander Davis. He also painted a portrait of his father that same year. In the following years, he was a photography apprentice in Providence and Newport, Rhode Island. In 1907, Moss reportedly won a competition to design the new Flag of Pennsylvania.

== Career ==
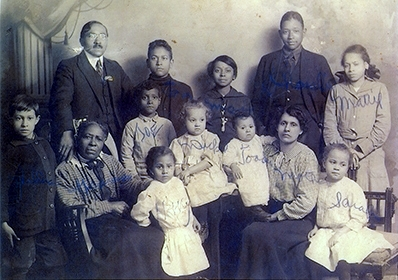
Moss (top left), his wife (bottom, second from right), mother (bottom, second from left), and children in 1917

In 1908 or 1909, he opened the Moss Studio in Carlisle, Pennsylvania at 228 North Pitt Street, the only known photography studio in Carlisle operated at the time by an African American. It was in Carlisle where he and his wife, Sarah Virginia Townson (1880-1970), raised twelve children during the next two decades. Moss opened a second studio in Harrisburg. In 1914, his photography skills resulted in Moss becoming the first African American member of the Professional Photographers of America. Soon after opening his studio, Moss received private tutor classes at Cooper Union where he studied sculpture. He later became one of the first African Americans to attend the Pennsylvania Academy of Fine Arts (PAFA).

It was at the PAFA where he began working with Henry Ossawa Tanner, the first African American artist to earn international fame. Tanner was the son of an African Methodist Episcopal Church bishop whose works often included Middle East settings and religious themes. Tanner's influence can often be seen in Moss' paintings, including Bedouin Encampment with Huts. In the 1930s, shortly after he and Sarah separated, Moss moved to Pittsburgh, Tanner's hometown, where he opened a painting studio at 2525 Centre Avenue and joined the Associated Artists of Pittsburgh. Moss' paintings received acclaim with a local newspaper describing it as "[Moss's] technique is regarded by art critics as being identical to that of the old masters." In 1950, an exhibition of work took place at the Wesley Center AME Zion Church in Pittsburgh. By that time Moss listed his job as "unable to work" in the 1950 United States census.

Moss often returned to Winchester, where he visited family and would sometimes paint their portraits. During a visit in 1961 at the home of his niece, Hattie Giles, the 83-year-old Moss died. He was buried in Orrick Cemetery in Winchester. Sarah died in Detroit in 1970 at the home of one of their daughters. Some of Moss' works are included in the collection of the Museum of the Shenandoah Valley (MSV), the Handley Library, and the Cumberland County Historical Society. Posthumous exhibits, with assistance from archivist Ruth E. Hodge, that feature Moss' works include at Carlisle's Shiloh Missionary Baptist Church in 2001 and the MSV's Contributions: African Americans in the Shenandoah Valley in 2022-23.

== Gallery ==
Portrait of Alexander W. Davis (1902), Museum of the Shenandoah Valley

Bedouin Encampment with Huts (1930), Museum of the Shenandoah Valley

== See also ==
- African-American art
- List of African-American visual artists
