= R. Lee Taylor =

R. Lee Taylor (September 28, 1924 – May 9, 2000) was the curator of the Museum of the Shenandoah Valley and a nationally known creator of miniature houses.

== Early life ==
R. Lee Taylor was born in Tennessee on September 28, 1924.

== Career ==
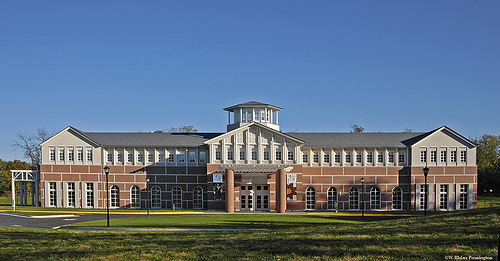
Museum of the Shenandoah Valley

R. Lee Taylor served during World War II and took part to the Normandy landings. After the war, he moved to New York City, where, in 1947, at 23 years old, he met Julian Wood Glass Jr., at the time 37 years old and an executive working for the petroleum industry.

In 1955, together with Glass, Taylor restored Glass's ancestral home, Glen Burnie, a Georgian-style home which Glass inherited from his father. Now the house is part of the Museum of the Shenandoah Valley. Taylor helped also Glass in searching the 18th and 19th century European and American fine and decorative arts for his collection.

In 1957, Taylor moved full-time into the Glen Burnie House and managed the site. He also created the surrounding gardens. In 1997, five years after Glass' death, the house opened as a museum; Taylor was the curator and lived on the second floor. Taylor retired in 1998 but continued to live at Glen Burnie House until his death in 2000.

The museum hosted Taylor's collection of miniature houses, the masterpiece the miniature of the Glen Burnie House, created between 1988 and 1990. A book about the collection has been published in 2005, R. Lee Taylor Miniatures – The Valley's Tiny Treasures edited by Marge Lee.

For his work in the Glen Burnie House's gardens, Taylor was honored by the Garden Club of Virginia. His miniature houses were featured in specialized publications like Nutshell News and Treasures in Miniature.

== Personal life ==
R. Lee Taylor had a long-term relationship with Julian Wood Glass, Jr. that ended in the mid 1970s. The two men drifted apart and reconciled just before Glass's death in 1992.

Taylor was well loved around Winchester, Virginia.

Taylor died on May 9, 2000, and his ashes are buried in the wall of the Glen Burnie Family Cemetery.
