= Feminist movement =

Campaigns for reforms on feminist issues

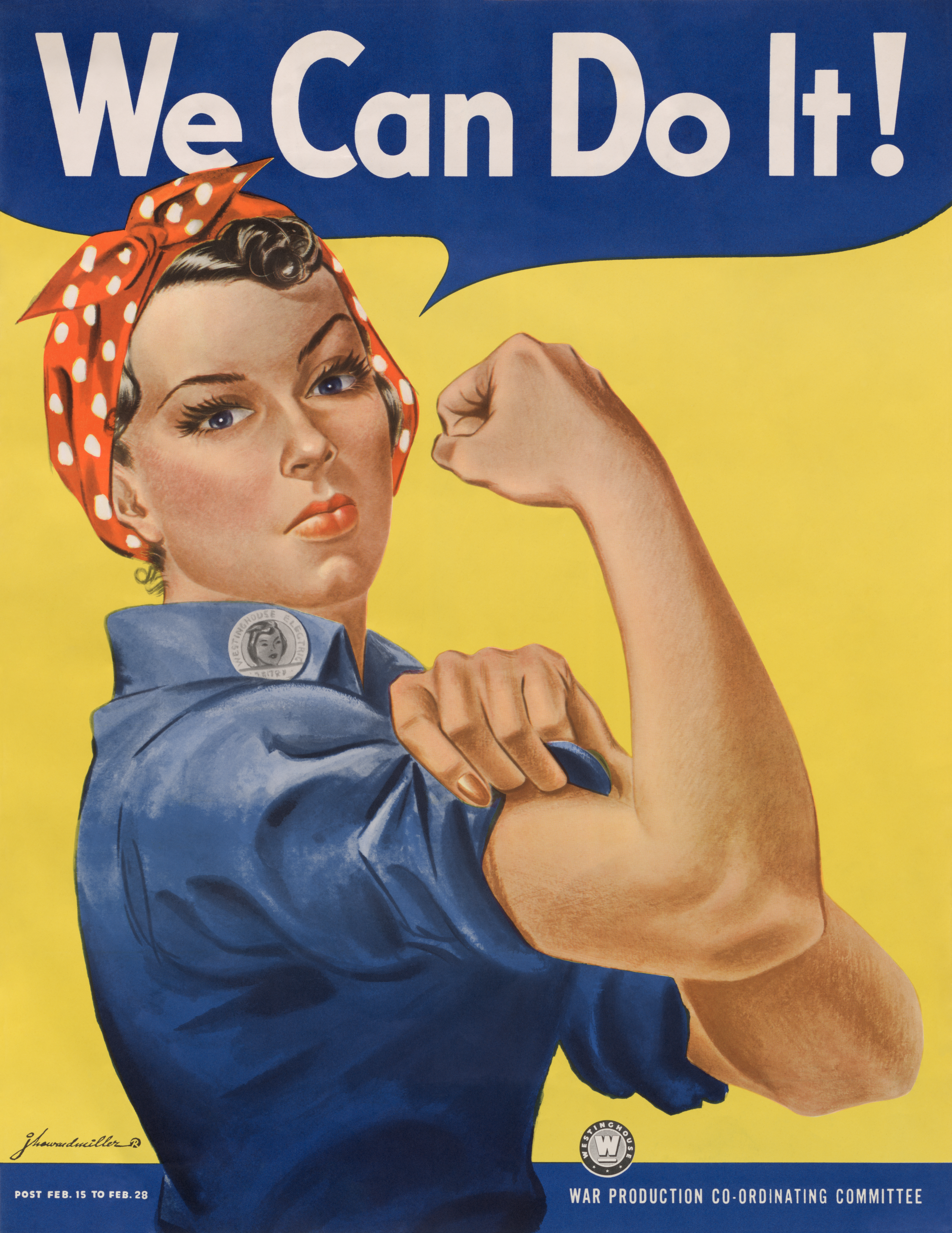
The "We Can Do It!" war-propaganda poster from 1943 was re-appropriated as a symbol of the feminist movement in the 1980s.

The feminist movement, also known as the women's movement, refers to a series of social movements and political campaigns for radical and liberal reforms on women's issues created by inequality between men and women. Such issues are women's liberation, reproductive rights, domestic violence, maternity leave, equal pay, women's suffrage, sexual harassment, and sexual violence. The movement's priorities have expanded since its beginning in the 19th century, and vary among nations and communities. Priorities range from opposition to female genital mutilation in one country, to opposition to the glass ceiling in another.

Feminism in parts of the Western world has been an ongoing movement since the turn of the century. During its inception, feminism has gone through a series of four high moments termed Waves. First-wave feminism was oriented around the station of middle- or upper-class white women and involved suffrage and political equality, education, right to property, organizational leadership, and marital freedoms. Second-wave feminism attempted to further combat social and cultural inequalities. Although the first wave of feminism involved mainly middle class white women, the second wave brought in women of different social classes, women of color, and women from other developing nations that were seeking solidarity. Third-wave feminism continued to address the financial, social, and cultural inequalities of women in business and in their home lives, and included renewed campaigning for greater influence of women in politics and media. In reaction to political activism, feminists have also had to maintain focus on women's reproductive rights, such as the right to abortion. Fourth-wave feminism examines the interlocking systems of power that contribute to the social stratification of traditionally marginalized groups, as well as the world around them.

== History ==
The base of the Women's Movement, since its inception, has been grounded in the injustice of inequality between men and women. Throughout history, the relationship between men and women has been that of a patriarchal society, citing the law of nature as the justification, which was interpreted to mean women are inferior to men. Allan Johnson, a sociologist who studies masculinity, wrote of patriarchy: "Patriarchy encourages men to seek security, status, and other rewards through control; to fear other men's ability to control and harm them; and to identify being in control as both their best defense against loss and humiliation and the surest route to what they need and desire". During the pre-feminist era, women were expected to be proper, delicate, and emotional nurturers of the household. They were raised in a manner in which gaining a husband to take care of them and raising a family was their ultimate priority. Author Mary Wollstonecraft wrote of the lesser sex in her 1792 novels A Vindication of the Rights of Woman & A Vindication of the Rights of Men, "..for, like the flowers which are planted in too rich a soil, strength and usefulness are sacrificed to beauty; and the flaunting leaves, after having pleased a fastidious eye, fade, disregarded on the stalk, long before the season when they ought to have arrived at maturity." Early ideas and activism of pro-feminism beliefs before the existence of the Feminist movement are described as protofeminist.

Protofeminists in the United States organized before the Seneca Falls convention as part of the suffrage, abolition, and other movements. Gender equality movements were practiced within the Haudenosaunee (Iroquois) nations long before America was colonized. Some have come to recognize the beginning of the feminist movement in 1832, as American Anti-Slavery Society (AASS), and The Connecticut Female Anti-Slavery Society formed as early as 1833. By the year 1837, 139 AASS societies were formed across the nation. The first national AASS convention was held in New York City in 1837. During the first convention, it was debated whether black women could participate. By the second and third conventions, demands were heard which saw to it that conventions were open to African American leadership and membership participation. On the evening of the second convention held in Philadelphia Hall, after the meeting adjourned and the attendees left, a violent mob burned down the hall. The issues discussed included the vote, oppression, and slavery, and laid the basis for future movements.

On November 15, 1895, Elizabeth Cady Stanton wrote an address describing how, in her perspective, the Seneca Falls Convention "... was the first woman's rights convention ever held in the world ... a declaration was read and signed by most of those present, and a series of radical resolutions adopted." Stanton's recollection prompted historians since the 1950s to attribute the Seneca Falls Convention in 1848 (at which the Women's Suffrage Movement began in the United States) as the earliest North American Feminist Movement. The convention met annually for fifteen years thereafter. Attendees drafted the Seneca Falls Declaration of Sentiments, outlining the new movement's ideology and political strategies.

The earliest North American and European international women's organizations were the International Council of Women, established in 1888 in Washington, DC, US. The term Feminist Movement was coined in the late nineteenth century to distinguish the Feminist Movement from the Women's Movement, allowing for inclusion of male feminists. The new movement thus prompted the likes of male feminists George Lansbury of the British Labour Party to run for political candidacy on the feminist ticket in 1906. As the awareness of feminist movements evolved, transnational feminism and nationalist feminist movements established themselves worldwide. Priorities and ideas vary based on the political or cultural positions of the women in the area where each movement originates. General topics of feminist coalition politics include lack of legal rights, poverty, medical vulnerability, and labor. These political issues are often organized around division by class, caste, ethnicity, religion, sexuality, nationality, and age. Early Russian nationalist feminist activists founded the All-Russian Union for Women's Equality in 1905, allowing women to vote and allowing co-education. In 1931, the All-Asian Women's Conference was held in Lahore in what was then British India. This meeting is one example of the time period which "demonstrated the networking of women across various divides". The spirit of the conference can be understood as International or Global feminist.

=== Pre-feminism society ===
The feminist movement has been an ongoing force throughout history. There is no way to determine the exact date when the feminist movement was first thought up, because women have been writing on the topic for thousands of years. For instance, the female poet from Ancient Greece, Sappho, born in roughly 615 BC, made waves as an acclaimed poet during a time when the written word was conducted primarily by men. She wrote poetry about, among other things, sexuality.

There have been four main waves of feminism since the beginning of the feminist movement in Western society, each with their own fight for women's rights. The first in the wave was in the 1840s. It was based on Education, right to property, organizational leadership, right to vote, and marital freedoms. The second wave was in the 1960s. It was based on gender issues, women's sexual liberation, reproductive rights, job opportunities for women, violence against women, and changes in custody and divorce laws. The third wave was in the 1990s. It was based on individualism, diversity, redefined what it meant to be a feminist, intersectionality, sex positivity, transfeminism, and postmodern feminism. Lastly, the fourth wave began in the 2000s, and is currently still in progress. It has been based around female empowerment, body shaming, sexual harassment, spiritual concerns, human rights, and concerns for the planet. The feminist movement continued during the periods between waves, just not to the extent of the four large motions.

The first documented gathering of women to form a movement with a common goal was on 5 October 1789, during the French Revolution. The event was later referred to as the Women's March on Versailles. The gathering was based on a lack of food, high market prices, and the fear of another famine occurring across France. On that day, women along with revolutionaries, had planned to gather in the market. Once gathered, the crowd stormed the Hotel de Ville (the City Hall of Paris) where weapons were being stored. The armed crowd then marched to the Palace of Versailles to draw King Louis XVI's attention to the high prices and food shortages. For King Louis XVI's remaining time on the throne, he stopped fighting the Revolutionaries. The march signaled a sort of change of power, showing that there is power in the people, and diminished the perception that the monarch was invincible.

The French Revolution began with the inequality felt by French citizens and came as a reaction from the "Declaration of the Rights of Man and of the Citizen" which was signed in August 1789. The declaration gave rights to men who were termed active citizens. Active citizenship was given to French men who were twenty-five years, or older, worked, and paid taxes, and who could not be titled a servant. The declaration dismissed the population who were women, foreigners, children, and servants, as passive citizens. Passive citizens, French women in particular, focused their fight on gaining citizenship and equal rights.

One of the first women to speak out on women's rights and inequality was French playwright Olympes de Gouges, who wrote the "Declaration of the Rights of Woman" in 1791, in contrast to the "Declaration of the Rights of Man and of the Citizen." She famously stated, "Women are born free and are man's equal in law. Social distinctions can be founded solely on common utility." Olympes used her words to urge women to speak up and take control of their rights. She demonstrated the similarity between the duties as a citizen of both men and women and the cohesion to ensue if both genders were considered equal.

British philosopher and writer Mary Wollstonecraft published in 1792 what has been seen as the first feminist treaty on the human rights of women, "Vindication of the Rights of Woman." She pressed the issue of equality between men and women, stating: "No society can be either virtuous or moral while half of the population are being subjugated by the other half'(Wollstonecraft 2009 p.59).

She went on to write about the Law of Nature and the desire for women to present more as themselves, and demand respect and equality from their male counterparts, "...men endeavor to sink us still lower, merely to render us alluring objects for a moment; and women, intoxicated by the adoration which men, under the influence of their senses, pay them, do not see, to obtain a durable interest in their hearts, or to become the friends of the fellow-creatures who find amusement in their society"(Wollstonecraft 2008, p. 10).

During the mid-nineteenth century, the women's movement developed as a result of women striving to improve their status and usefulness in society. Nancy Cott, historian and professor, wrote about the objectives of the feminist movement: "to initiate measures of charitable benevolence, temperance, and social welfare and to initiate struggles for civil rights, social freedoms, higher education, remunerative occupations, and the ballot."The setting of these goals resulted from women's rising awareness of the precariousness of their situation in the patriarchal society of the 1800s. The developing movement promoted a series of new images for women: True Womanhood, Real Womanhood, Public Womanhood, and New Womanhood."

True Womanhood was the ideal that women were meant to be pure and moral. A true woman was raised learning manners and submission to males to be a good wife and mother.

Real Womanhood came to be with the Civil war, when women were forced to work in place of men who were at war. Real Women learned how to support themselves and took that knowledge with them in their marriage and education.

Public Womanhood came with women being allowed to work in jobs previously performed by men such as nursing, teaching, and secretarial work, but for less pay than men.

New Womanhood was based on eliminating the traditional conformity of women's roles and social inferiority to men, and living a more fulfilled life.

"The four overlapping phases of the Women's Movement advanced women from domestic prisoners to significant members of their communities within less than a century."

In the 1820s the women's movement, then called the temperance movement, expanded from Europe and moved into the United States. Women began speaking out on the effects of the consumption of alcohol had on the morals of their husbands and blamed it on the problems within their household. They called for a moral reform by limiting or prohibiting the sale and consumption of alcohol, beginning the fight toward Prohibition which did not begin until 1920. The women fighting for the temperance movement came to the realization, without the ability to vote on the issues they were fighting for, nothing would ever change.

== Feminist movement in Western society ==
Feminism in the United States, Canada, and a number of countries in Western Europe has been divided by scholars into three waves: first, second and third-wave feminism. Recent (early 2010s) research suggests there may be a fourth wave characterized, in part, by new media platforms.

The feminist movement's agenda includes acting as a counterpart to the putatively patriarchal strands in the dominant masculine culture. While differing during the progression of "waves", it is a movement that has sought to challenge the political structure, power holders, and cultural beliefs or practices.

Although antecedents to feminism may be found far back before the 18th century, the seeds of the modern feminist movement were planted during the late part of that century. Christine de Pizan, a late medieval writer, was possibly the earliest feminist in the western tradition. She is believed to be the first woman to make a living out of writing. Feminist thought began to take a more substantial shape during the Enlightenment with such thinkers as Lady Mary Wortley Montagu and the Marquis de Condorcet championing women's education. The first scientific society for women was founded in Middelburg, a city in the south of the Dutch republic, in 1785.

=== First Wave Feminism ===
Though the feminist movement had already begun in America with the Temperance Movement, the First Wave of Feminism, known as the Suffragette Movement, began on 19–20 July 1848 during the first Women's Right Convention in Seneca Falls, New York. The convention drew over 300 people, who were predominately white, middle-class women. Sixty-eight women and thirty-two men signed the "Declaration of Sentiments", which called for equal rights for women and men on the basis of education, right to property, organizational leadership, right to vote, and marital freedoms.

For the Suffragette's first major display, they held a parade on 3 March 1913, in Washington DC. The first suffragette parade, which was also the first civil rights march on Washington, was coordinated by Alice Paul and the National American Suffrage Association. The parade drew over five thousand participants who were led by Inez Milholland. The parade was strategically scheduled for the day before the inauguration of President Woodrow Wilson, which drew in a lot of people to Washington. The women gathered in front of the US Capitol and then traveled fourteen blocks to the Treasury Department. The parade proceeded through the crowd of angry spectators who became verbally and physically abusive toward the women. By the end of the demonstration, there was reported at least one hundred people taken to the hospital due to injuries.

In 1918 Crystal Eastman wrote an article published in the Birth Control Review, she contended that birth control is a fundamental right for women and must be available as an alternative if they are to participate fully in the modern world. "In short, if feminism, conscious and bold and intelligent, leads the demand, it will be supported by the secret eagerness of all women to control the size of their families, and a suffrage state should make short work of repealing these old laws that stand in the way of birth control." She stated "I don't believe there is one woman within the confines of this state who does not believe in birth control!"

The women who made the first efforts towards women's suffrage came from more stable and privileged backgrounds, and were able to dedicate time and energy into making change. Initial developments for women, therefore, mainly benefited white women in the middle and upper classes. During the second wave, the feminist movement became more inclusive of women of color and women of different cultures.

=== Second Wave Feminism ===
The 1960s second wave of feminism was termed the Women's liberation movement. It was the largest and broadest social movement in US history. The second wave was based around a sociopolitical-cultural movement. Activists fought for gender issues, women's sexual liberation, reproductive rights, job opportunities for women, an end to violence against women, and changes in custody and divorce laws. It is believed the feminist movement gained attention in 1963, when Betty Friedan published her novel, The Feminine Mystique. Friedan wrote of "the problem that has no name"(Friedan 1963), as a way to describe the depression women felt about their limited choices in life. While reading The Feminine Mystique, women found they related to what Friedan wrote. Women were forced to look at themselves in a way they had not before. They saw within themselves, all the things they had given up in the name of conformity.

The women's movement became more popular in May 1968 when women began to read again, more widely, the book The Second Sex, written in 1949 by a defender of women's rights, Simone de Beauvoir. De Beauvoir's writing explained why it was difficult for talented women to become successful. The obstacles de Beauvoir enumerates include women's inability to make as much money as men do in the same profession, women's domestic responsibilities, society's lack of support towards talented women, and women's fear that success will lead to an annoyed husband or prevent them from even finding a husband at all. De Beauvoir also argues that women lack ambition because of how they are raised, noting that girls are told to follow the duties of their mothers, whereas boys are told to exceed the accomplishments of their fathers. Along with other influences, such as Betty Friedan, Simone de Beauvoir's work helped the feminist movement to solidify the second wave. Contributors to The Women's Liberation Movement include Simone de Beauvoir, Christiane Rochefort, Christine Delphy and Anne Tristan.

Also in 1968, second wave feminists began founding feminist and lesbian periodicals so they could publish their writings without censorship or denigration from the male press. The women in print movement sought to establish autonomous networks of feminist writers, publishers, printers, distributors, and booksellers in support of a woman-focused print culture. Many of these publishing enterprises were separatist and chose not to work with men or non-feminist businesses. Others, such as Kitchen Table: Women of Color Press, worked with men for pragmatic or ideological reasons.

The defining moment in the 1960s was a demonstration held to protest against the Miss America pageant in Atlantic City on 7 September 1968, termed the "cattle parade". The purpose of the protest was to call attention to beauty standards and the objectification of women. Another key protest of the second wave was the Fifth Street Women's Building Takeover in January 1971, when over a hundred women illegally occupied an abandoned New York City building and established a food co-operative, day care, and lesbian center before being forcibly removed and arrested by police.

Through this era, women gained equal rights such as a right to an education, a right to work, and a right to contraception and abortion. One of the most important issues that The Women's Liberation movement faced was the banning of abortion and contraception, which the group saw as a violation of women's rights. Thus, they made a declaration known as Le Manifeste de 343 which held signatures from 343 women admitting to having had an illegal abortion. The declaration was published in two French newspapers, Le Nouvel observateur and Le Monde, on 5 April 1971. The group gained support upon the publication. Women received the right to abort with the passing of the Veil Law in 1975.

=== Third Wave Feminism ===
The 1980s and 1990s drew a different perspective in the feminist movement and was termed Grrl Feminism or Riot Grrl Feminism. The ideas of this era took root with the popularization of the Riot grrrl feminist punk subculture in Olympia, Washington, in the early 1990s. The feminists of this era strived to redefine what it meant to be a feminist. They embraced individualism and diversity, and pushed to eliminate conformity. The twentieth century woman had the mindset of wanting to have it all. They wanted a professional career, as well as be a wife and mother. Harriet Kimble Wrye PhD, ABPP, FIPA wrote of her research on the psychoanalytic perspectives of being a feminist in the twentieth century, "So many of us look back, and recognizing the pressures under which we struggled, wonder how we did what we did and at what price."

On 11 October 1991, the first televised workplace sexual harassment case was aired. Anita Hill, who was a law professor at the time accused Supreme Court nominee Clarence Thomas of persistent sexual harassment. Anita Hill recounted the details of her experience in court to an all male panel. Despite there being four corroborating witnesses, the case was dismissed and Clarence Thomas was confirmed into the Supreme Court. Though the case was dismissed, it encouraged other women to speak out on their own experiences which led to Congress passing the Civil Rights Act of 1991, which gave legal action against workplace sexual harassment.

The United Nations Human Development Report 2004 estimated that when both paid employment and unpaid household tasks are accounted for, on average women work more than men. In rural areas of selected developing countries women performed an average of 20% more work than men, or 120% of men's total work, an additional 102 minutes per day. In the OECD countries surveyed, on average women performed 5% more work than men, or 105% of men's total work—an additional 20 minutes per day. However, men did up to 19 minutes more work per day than women in five out of the eighteen OECD countries surveyed: Canada, Denmark, Hungary, Israel, and The Netherlands.

During the course of the women's movement in Western society, affective changes have taken place, including women's suffrage, the right to initiate divorce proceedings and "no fault" divorce, the right of women to make individual decisions regarding pregnancy (including access to contraceptives and abortion), and the right to own property. It has also led to broad employment for women at more equitable wages, and access to university education.

== Feminist movement in Eastern society ==
=== Feminism in China ===
Prior to the 20th century, women in China were considered essentially different from men. Feminism in China started in the 20th century with the 1911 Revolution. In China, Feminism has a strong association with socialism and class issues. Some commentators believe that this close association is damaging to Chinese feminism and argue that the interests of party are placed before those of women.

In the patriarchal society, the struggle for women's emancipation means to enact laws that guarantee women's full equality of race, sex, property and freedom of marriage. To further eliminate the legacy of the class society of patriarchal women (drowning of infants, corset, foot binding, etc.), discrimination, play, mutilate women's traditional prejudice and habitual forces on the basis of the development of productive forces, it is gradually needful on achieving gender in politics, economy, social and family aspects of equality.

Before the westernization movement and the reform movement, women had set off a wave of their own strength in the Taiping Heavenly Kingdom (1851–1864). However, there are too many women from the bottom identities in the Taiping Heavenly Kingdom. It is difficult to get rid of the fate of being used. Until the end of the Qing Dynasty, women with more knowledges took the initiative in the fight for women's rights and that is where feminism basically started.

The term 'feminism' was first transmitted to China in 1791 which was proposed by Olympe de Gouges and promoted the 'women's liberation'. The feminist movement in China was mainly kickstarted and driven by male feminists prior to female feminists.

Key male feminists in China in the 19th to 20th century included Liang Qichao, Ma Junwu and Jin Tianhe. In 1897, Liang Qichao proposed banning of foot-binding and encouraged women to engage in the workforce, political environment and education. The foot-binding costume had long been established in China which was an act to display the beauty and social status of women by binding their feet into an extremely small shoes with good decorations and ornaments. Liang Qichao proposed the abolishment of this act due to concern the health of female being a supportive wives and caring mothers. He also proposed to reduce the number of female dependents in family and encouraged women to receive the rights of education and enter the workforce to be economically independent from men and finally help the nation to reach higher wealth and prosperity. Feminists Ma Junwu and Jin Tianhe both supported the equality between husbands and wives, legitimate and equal rights for women, including the right to enter the political sphere. A key assertion from Jin Tianhe was women as the mother of the nation. These views from male feminists in early feminism in China represented the image of ideal women in the imagination of men.

Key female feminists in China in the 19th to 20th century included Lin Zongsu, He Zhen, Chen Xiefen and Qiu Jin. The female feminists in early China focused more on the methods or ways that women should behave and liberate themselves to achieve equal and deserved rights and independence. He Zhen expressed her opinion that women's liberation was not correlated to the interest of the nation and she analysed three reasons behind the male feminists included: following the Western trend, to alleviate their financial burdens and high quality of reproduction. Besides, Li Zongsu proposed that women should strive for their legitimate rights which includes broader aspects than the male feminists: call for their own right over men, the Qing Court and in an international extent.

In the Qing Dynasty, the discussion on feminism had two dimensions including the sex differences between men and women such as maternal role and duties of women and social difference between genders; the other dimension was the aim of liberation of women. The view of the feminists were diverse: some believed feminism was benefiting the nation and some believed feminism was associated with the individual development of female in improving their rights and welfare.

In the 1970s, the Marxist philosophy about female and feminism was transmitted to China and became the guiding principle of feminism movement in China by introducing class struggle theories to address gender quality. In the 1990s, more female scholars were adapted to feminism in Western countries, and they promoted feminism and equal rights for women by publishing, translating and carrying out research on global feminism and made feminism in China as one part of their study to raise more concern and awareness for gender equality issues. An important means of improving women's status in China was through legislation. After the PRC's founding in 1949, women were granted the same rights that men were entitled to by law, largely because women's liberation was presented as part of the Chinese nation's liberation.

== Language ==
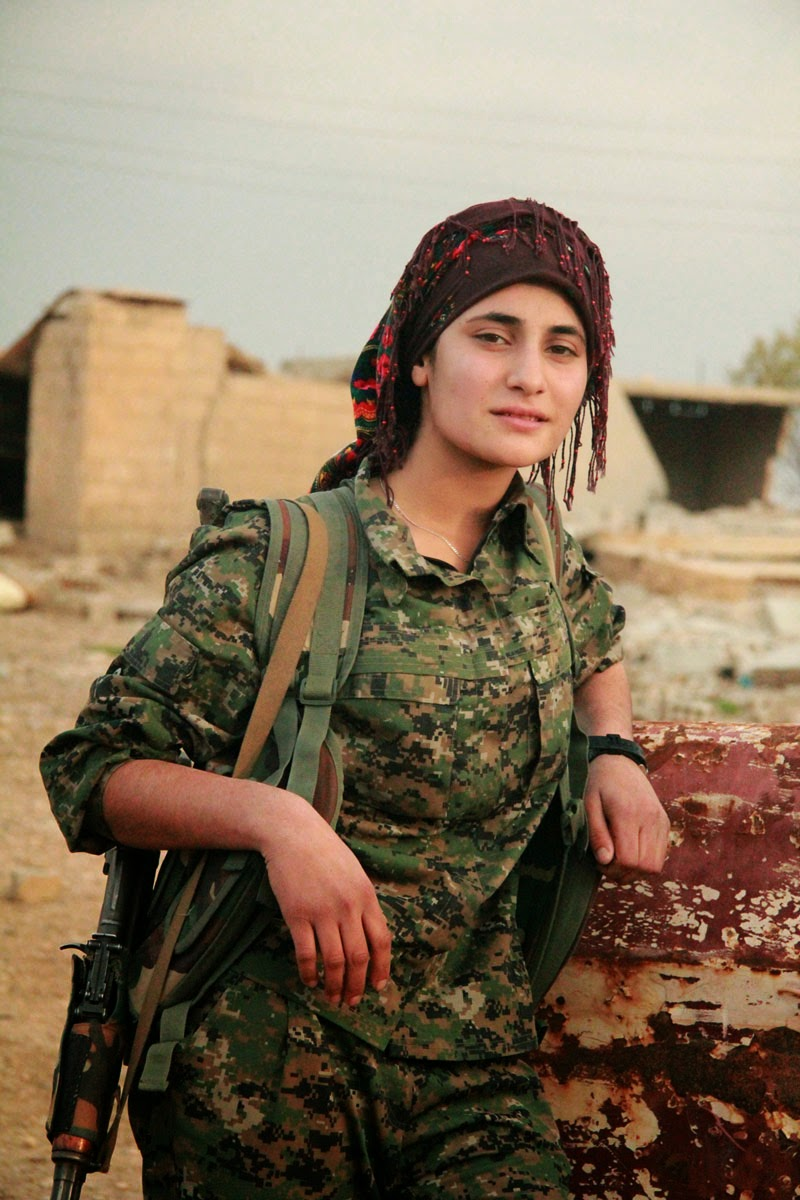
A YPJ fighter, in November 2014

Feminists are sometimes, though not exclusively, proponents of using non-sexist language, such as using "Ms" to refer to both married and unmarried women. Feminists are also often proponents of using gender-inclusive language, such as "humanity" instead of "mankind", or "they" in place of "he" where the gender is unknown.

Gender-neutral language is language usage which is aimed at minimizing assumptions regarding the gender of human referents. The advocacy of gender-neutral language reflects, at least, two different agendas: one aims to clarify the inclusion of both sexes or genders (gender-inclusive language); the other proposes that gender, as a category, is rarely worth marking in language (gender-neutral language). Gender-neutral language is sometimes described as non-sexist language by advocates and politically correct language by opponents.

Not only has the movement come to change the language into gender neutral but the feminist movement has brought up how people use language. Emily Martin describes the concept of how metaphors are gendered and ingrained into everyday life. Metaphors are used in everyday language and have become a way that people describe the world. Martin explains that these metaphors structure how people think and in regards to science can shape what questions are being asked. If the right questions are not being asked then the answers are not going to be the right either. For example, the aggressive sperm and passive egg is a metaphor that felt 'natural' to people in history but as scientists have reexamined this phenomenon they have come up with a new answer. "The sperm tries to pull its getaway act even on the egg itself, but is held down against its struggles by molecules on the surface of the egg that hook together with counterparts on the sperm's surface, fastening the sperm until the egg can absorb it." This is a goal in feminism to see these gendered metaphors and bring it to the public's attention. The outcome of looking at things in a new perspective can produce new information.

== Heterosexual relationships ==
The increased entry of women into the workplace beginning in the 20th century has affected gender roles and the division of labor within households. Sociologist Arlie Russell Hochschild in The Second Shift and The Time Bind presents evidence that in two-career couples, men and women, on average, spend about equal amounts of time working, but women still spend more time on housework. Feminist writer Cathy Young responds to Hochschild's assertions by arguing that, in some cases, women may prevent the equal participation of men in housework and parenting. Economists Mark Aguiar and Erik Hurst calculate that the amount of time spent on housework by women since the 1960s has dropped considerably. Leisure for both men and women has risen significantly and by about the same amount for both sexes. Jeremy Greenwood, Ananth Seshadri and Mehmet Yorukoglu argue that the introduction of modern appliances into the home has allowed women to enter the work force.

Feminist criticisms of men's contributions to child care and domestic labor in the Western middle class are typically centered around the idea that it is unfair for women to be expected to perform more than half of a household's domestic work and child care when both members of the relationship perform an equal share of work outside the home. Several studies provide statistical evidence that the financial income of married men does not affect their rate of attending to household duties.

In Dubious Conceptions, Kristin Luker discusses the effect of feminism on teenage girls' choices to bear children, both in and out of wedlock. She says that as childbearing out of wedlock has become more socially acceptable, young women, especially poor young women, while not bearing children at a higher rate than in the 1950s, now see less of a reason to get married before having a child. Her explanation for this is that the economic prospects for poor men are slim, hence poor women have a low chance of finding a husband who will be able to provide reliable financial support due to the rise of unemployment from more workers on the market, from just men to women and men.

Some studies have suggested that both men and women perceive feminism as being incompatible with romance. However, a recent survey of U.S. undergraduates and older adults found that feminism actually has a positive impact on relationship health for women and sexual satisfaction for men, and found no support for negative stereotypes of feminists. Newer research has refuted that claim.

Virginia Satir said the need for relationship education emerged from shifting gender roles as women gained greater rights and freedoms during the 20th century:

"As we moved into the 20th century, we arrived with a very clearly prescribed way that males and females in marriage were to behave with one another ... The pattern of the relationship between husband and wife was that of the dominant male and submissive female ... A new era has since dawned ... the climate of relationships had changed, and women were no longer willing to be submissive ... The end of the dominant/submissive model in relationships was in sight. However, there was very little that had developed to replace the old pattern; couples floundered ... Retrospectively, one could have expected that there would be a lot of chaos and a lot of fall-out. The change from the dominant/submissive model to one of equality is a monumental shift. We are learning how a relationship based on genuine feelings of equality can operate practically."

— Virginia Satir, Introduction to PAIRS

== Women's health ==
Historically there has been a need to study and contribute to the health and well-being of a woman that previously has been lacking. Londa Schiebinger suggests that the common biomedical model is no longer adequate and there is a need for a broader model to ensure that all aspects of a woman are being cared for. Schiebinger describes six contributions that must occur to have success: political movement, academic women studies, affirmative action, health equality act, geo-political forces, and professional women not being afraid to talk openly about women issues. Political movements come from the streets and are what the people as a whole want to see changed. An academic women study is the support from universities in order to teach a subject that most people have never encountered. Affirmative action enacted is a legal change to acknowledge and do something for the times of neglect people were subjected to. Women's Health Equity Act legally enforces the idea that medicine needs to be tested in suitable standards such as including women in research studies and is also allocates a set amount of money to research diseases that are specific towards women. Research has shown that there is a lack of research in autoimmune disease, which mainly affects women. "Despite their prevalence and morbidity, little progress has been made toward a better understanding of those conditions, identifying risk factors, or developing a cure" this article reinforces the progress that still needs to be made. Geo-political forces can improve health, when the country is not at a sense of threat in war there is more funding and resources to focus on other needs, such as women's health. Lastly, professional women not being afraid to talk about women's issues moves women from entering into these jobs and preventing them for just acting as men and instead embracing their concerns for the health of women. These six factors need to be included for there to be change in women's health.

== Religion ==
Feminist theology is a movement that reconsiders the traditions, practices, scriptures, and theologies of religions from a feminist perspective. Some of the goals of feminist theology include increasing the role of women among the clergy and religious authorities, reinterpreting male-dominated imagery and language about God, determining the place of women in relation to career and motherhood, and studying images of women in the religion's sacred texts.

The feminist movement has affected religion and theology in profound ways. In liberal branches of Protestant Christianity, women are now allowed to be ordained as clergy, and in Reform, Conservative and Reconstructionist Judaism, women are now allowed to be ordained as rabbis and cantors. In some of these groups, some women are gradually obtaining positions of power that were formerly only held by men, and their perspectives are now sought out in developing new statements of belief. These trends, however, have been resisted within most sects of Islam, Roman Catholicism, and Orthodox Christianity. Within Roman Catholicism, most women understand that, through the dogma of the faith, they are to hold, within the family, a place of love and focus on the family. They also understand the need to rise above that does not necessarily constitute a woman to be considered less than, but in fact equal to, that of her husband who is called to be the patriarch of the family and provide love and guidance to his family as well.

Christian feminism is a branch of feminist theology which seeks to reinterpret and understand Christianity in light of the equality of women and men. While there is no standard set of beliefs among Christian feminists, most agree that God does not discriminate on the basis of biologically determined characteristics such as sex.

Early feminists such as Elizabeth Cady Stanton concentrated almost solely on "making women equal to men." However, the Christian feminist movement chose to concentrate on the language of religion because they viewed the historic gendering of God as male as a result of the pervasive influence of patriarchy. Rosemary Radford Ruether provided a systematic critique of Christian theology from a feminist and theist point of view. Stanton was a freethinker and Reuther is an agnostic who was born to Catholic parents but no longer practices the faith.

Islamic feminism is concerned with the role of women in Islam and aims for the full equality of all Muslims, regardless of gender, in public and private life. Although rooted in Islam, the movement's pioneers have also used secular and Western feminist discourses. Advocates of the movement seek to highlight the deeply rooted teachings of equality in the Quran and encourage a questioning of the patriarchal interpretation of Islamic teaching through the Quran, hadith (sayings of Muhammad), and sharia (law) towards the creation of a more equal and just society.

Jewish feminism seeks to improve the religious, legal, and social status of women within Judaism and to open up new opportunities for religious experience and leadership for Jewish women. In its modern form, the movement can be traced to the early 1970s in the United States. According to Judith Plaskow, who has focused on feminism in Reform Judaism, the main issues for early Jewish feminists in these movements were the exclusion from the all-male prayer group or minyan, the exemption from positive time-bound mitzvot, and women's inability to function as witnesses and to initiate divorce.

Starting since the 1970s, the Goddess movement has been embraced by some feminists as well.

== Businesses ==
Feminist activists have established a range of feminist businesses, including women's bookstores, feminist credit unions, feminist presses, feminist mail-order catalogs, and feminist restaurants. These businesses flourished as part of the second and third-waves of feminism in the 1970s, 1980s, and 1990s. Although the range of feminist businesses has increased significantly, a study stated that women-owned businesses are frequently described as underperforming, in that, their business remain small and marginal. Women still have high level of barrier to become an entrepreneur compared to males.

== See also ==
Subjects or international organizations

- Comprehensive sex education
- Equity feminism
- Individualist feminism
- Jewish feminism
- Material feminism
- Marxist feminism
- New Thought
- Radical feminism
- Relationship education
- Sexual revolution
- Third-wave feminism
- Timeline of women's rights (other than voting)
- Timeline of women's suffrage
- Women, Culture, and Society
- Women's International League for Peace and Freedom
- Women's liberation movement
- List of feminists
- List of suffragists and suffragettes
- List of women's rights activists

By continent

- Feminism in Africa
- Feminism in Asia
- Feminism in Europe
- Feminism in North America
- Feminism in Oceania
- Feminism in South America

Country or region specific articles

- Feminism in 1950s Britain
- Feminist movements in the United States
- Jam'iyat-e Nesvan-e Vatankhah (Iran)
