= Winchester, Virginia, in the American Civil War =

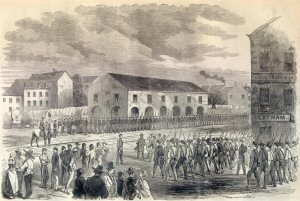
An illustration of the Confederate militia mustering in Winchester, Virginia, from Harper's Weekly in 1861

The city of Winchester, Virginia, and the surrounding area were the site of numerous battles during the American Civil War, as the contending armies strove to control the lower Shenandoah Valley. Winchester changed hands more often than any other Confederate city.

== Background ==
=== John Brown's raid on Harpers Ferry ===
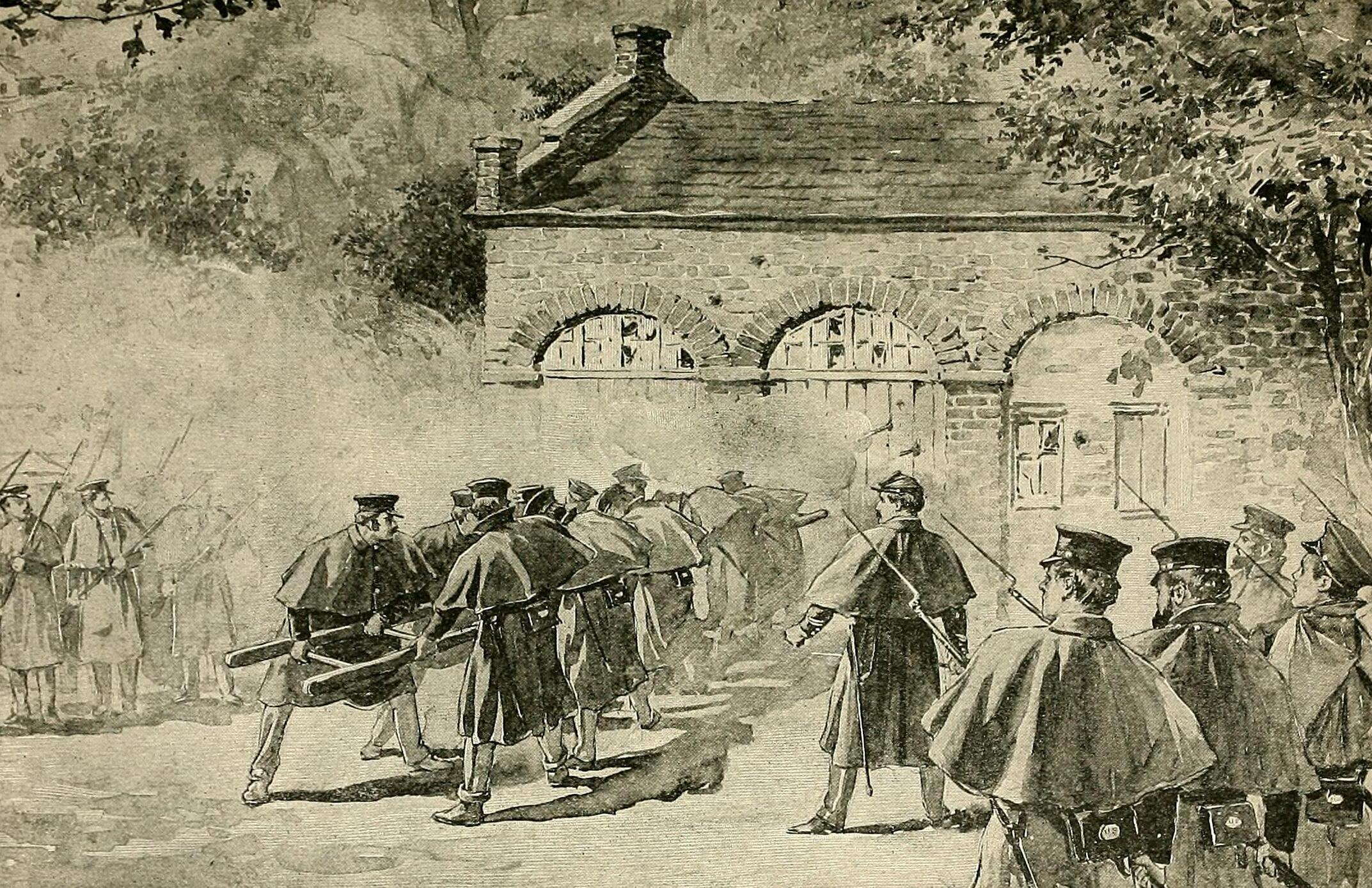
The 31st Virginia Militia participated in the defeat of John Brown's raid

Ties between Winchester and the American Civil War are considered to have begun with the suppression of John Brown's raid in October 1859, in nearby Harpers Ferry. Colonel Lewis Tilghman Moore, of the 31st Virginia Militia of Frederick County, assembled 150 militiamen from the Marion Guards, the Morgan Continentals, and the Mount Vernon Riflemen, and moved them on the Winchester and Potomac Railroad to Harpers Ferry, 30 miles (48 km) to the east. Ironically, the first death of Brown's raid was Heyward Shepherd, a free black from Winchester who worked for the B&O Railroad; he was buried in Winchester's colored cemetery with military honors. Following the raid, Judge Richard Parker of Winchester presided over the trial of John Brown, sentencing the insurrectionist to hang.

The bodies of a son of John Brown and three other raiders, one white (Jeremiah Anderson) and two Blacks (John Anthony Copeland and Shields Green), were taken to the Winchester Medical College for use in medical education. During the two months of the first Union occupation (March 12–May 25, 1862), the Union forces would certainly have learned of this. The bodies of the three dissected bodies were long vanished when Union forces arrived two years later; the only remains were unlabeled bones, taken out in the country and tossed haphazardly into a pit.

In contrast, the body of Watson Brown had not been dissected but had been turned into a medical specimen. Half the skull and the brain had been removed, but the muscles and blood vessels had been preserved and stained. When Union troops arrived his body was on display in the one-room museum of the college, with a label that read: "John Brown's son—thus always with Abolitionists", and the lips "purposely distorted in disrespect". It has been skinned, with the skin made into moccasins and the scraps given out as souvenirs. The troops were also surely informed of the Black community's fear of and hatred for the college, because it regularly robbed Black graves.

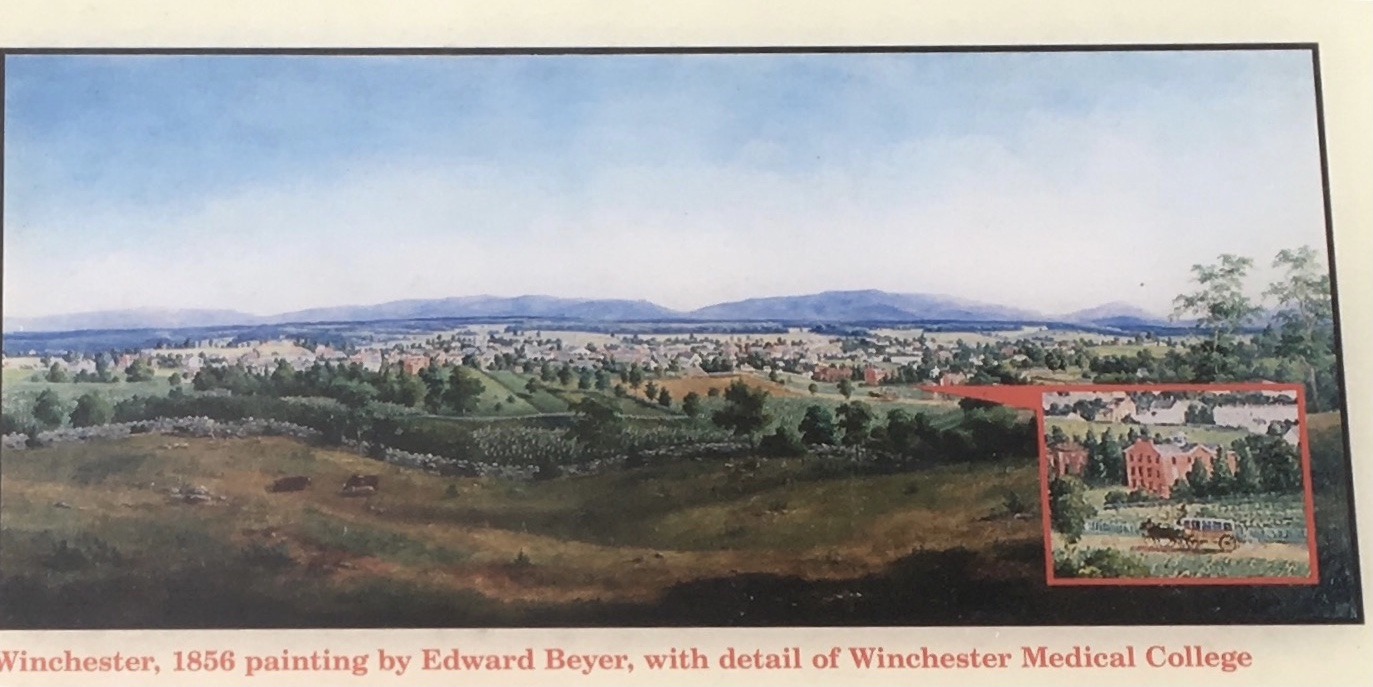
Winchester Medical College, Winchester, Virginia (detail)

John Brown was the Union's hero and the Confederacy's villain in the Civil War. He died to end slavery. Union soldiers marched to John Brown's Body, which became the Battle Hymn of the Republic. It was the assassination of Lincoln that displaced Brown from the nation's consciousness. To dishonor a son of Brown, who also died fighting slavery, and displaying the body as a crude lesson to abolitionists, was deeply offensive to the Union officers.

The Union officers set the college's building on fire on May 16, 1862. They did not allow fire engines to extinguish the blaze, and the building burned to the ground. The college never reopened.

=== Secession deliberations ===
Neither Winchester nor the Commonwealth of Virginia was particularly fond of secession from the Union. Virginia was not a cotton state, and the Valley's economy and culture centered around small family-owned farms producing wheat and cattle. However pro-Union sentiment was often conditional. Historian William A. Link writes:

On December 14, Robert Young Conrad, subsequently the Unionists' leader at the Richmond secession convention, composed resolutions adopted by a Frederick County meeting in Winchester. Although Northerners had launched an "insane war" against Southern institutions, Frederick citizens regarded slavery "as perfectly consistent with civilization, humanity, and piety." Virginians would not "tamely submit" to any limitations of their rights. The resolutions appealed to the North to repeal obnoxious laws regarding fugitive slaves and to suppress abolitionists' activities that led "to invasions of other States, seducing slaves to abscond, harboring runaways, and otherwise disturbing the peace of sister States."

At the same time, the resolutions renounced secession, promised "unfaltering attachment" to the Union; proposed boycotting imports from some Northern states; and called for, if necessary, a national convention to resolve the sectional issues.

In January 1861, Virginia's Governor John Letcher and the State Assembly called for and sponsored the Peace Conference of 1861, which ended up failing in its purpose to get the U.S. Congress to review an agreed upon compromise. Virginia ran an election on February 4, 1861, to elect delegates to a special state convention to deliberate on the question of secession. Of the four candidates (two pro-union and two pro-secession), Winchester and Frederick County elected two pro-union delegates:

- Robert Y. Conrad
- James Marshall

Two thirds of the votes went to the two pro-Union candidates, revealing the strong Union sentiments of the town and county at that time. On April 4, the convention voted, and secession was defeated by a vote of 88 to 45. However, later that month the firing upon Fort Sumter prompted newly-elected President Abraham Lincoln to issue a call for 75,000 volunteers, including a call to Virginia to provide troops. Governor Letcher responded on April 15 on behalf of the state refusing Lincoln's request. In response, the convention passed an ordinance of secession on April 17 by a vote of 88 to 55, which was ratified by popular vote on May 23, 1861. Immediately after this vote, Governor Letcher ordered the capture of the federal arsenal at Harper's Ferry, and Winchester companies of the Virginia militia were among the first to arrive, under the command of Colonel Thomas J. "Stonewall" Jackson.

=== Winchester's strategic location ===
Located at the north end of the lower Shenandoah Valley at a latitude north of the Federal capital city of Washington, D.C., Winchester's location was the hub of key roadways linking the Ohio Valley to the eastern United States coastal plains. Sitting just south of the Potomac River, Winchester lay on the only route between the east and western United States with direct connections to Washington, D.C. Passing through or nearby Winchester are these major transportation and communications routes:

- The Baltimore and Ohio Railroad
- The Chesapeake and Ohio Canal
- The Winchester and Potomac Railroad
- The Manassas Gap Railroad and Manassas Gap
- The Valley Pike and Martinsburg Pike
- The Pughtown Pike
- The Northwestern Grade and Petticoat Gap to Romney, West Virginia
- The Berryville Pike, Castleman's Ferry and Snickers Gap
- The Millwood Pike, Berry's Ferry and Ashby's Gap
- The Front Royal Pike and Chester Gap

Winchester was a base of operations for several Confederate incursions into the Northern United States, at times threatening the Federal capital city. Winchester also served as a central point for troops conducting raids against the Baltimore and Ohio Railroad, Chesapeake and Ohio Canal, and turnpike and telegraph paths along those routes and the Potomac River Valley. For instance, in 1861, Col. Thomas J. Jackson removed 56 locomotives and 386 railroad cars, along with miles of track, from the B&O Railroad and ultimately closed down the B&O's main line for ten months. Much of the effort to transport this equipment by horse and carriage centered in Winchester.

== Winchester in the Eastern Theater ==
Winchester was a key strategic position for the Confederate States Army during the war. It was an important operational objective in Gen. Joseph E. Johnston's and Jackson's defense of the Shenandoah Valley in 1861, Stonewall Jackson's Valley Campaign of 1862, the Gettysburg campaign of 1863, and the Valley Campaigns of 1864.

=== Battles fought around or involving Winchester ===
- Colonel Jackson's Defense of the Lower Valley of 1861
  - The Great Train Raid of 1861, May 23 – June 23, 1861
  - The Skirmish of Falling Waters, July 2, 1861
- General Jackson's Valley Campaign of 1862
  - The Romney Expedition, January 1–24, 1862
  - The First Battle of Kernstown, March 23, 1862
  - The First Battle of Winchester, May 25, 1862
- General Robert E. Lee's Maryland Campaign of 1862
  - The Battle of Harpers Ferry, September 12–15, 1862
- General Robert E. Lee's Gettysburg campaign of 1863
  - The Second Battle of Winchester, June 13–15, 1863
- General Early's Valley Campaign and Washington, D.C. Raid of 1864
  - The Battle of Snicker's Ferry, July 17–18, 1864
  - The Battle of Rutherford's Farm, July 20, 1864
  - The Second Battle of Kernstown, July 24, 1864
  - The Battle of Berryville, September 3–4, 1864
  - The Third Battle of Winchester, September 19, 1864
  - The Battle of Belle Grove (or Cedar Creek), October 19, 1864

== The occupations of Winchester ==
Including minor cavalry raids and patrols, and occasional reconnaissances by various forces, it is claimed that Winchester changed hands as many as 72 times during the course of the war, and 13 times in one day. Battles raged all along Main Street at different points in the war. Both Union General Sheridan and Stonewall Jackson located their headquarters just one block apart at various times. During the war, Winchester suffered greatly under five major periods of Union occupation:

- The Occupation of Major General Nathaniel Banks – (March 12 to May 25, 1862, and June 4 to September 2, 1862)
- The Occupation of Major General Robert Milroy – (December 24, 1862, to June 15, 1863)
- The Burning and Occupation of Major General Philip Sheridan – (September 19, 1864, to February 27, 1865)
- The Occupation of Major General Winfield Scott Hancock – February 27, 1865, to June 27, 1865
- The Occupation of the First Military District of Major General John Schofield – (End of War to January 26, 1870)

During the Union occupation of Winchester, many residents were exiled from town, personal property was stolen, citizens rendering medical assistance to wounded soldiers were shot and murdered, homes were illegally stolen, occupied and destroyed, a medical school was burned down, and the citizens of the Commonwealth were not allowed to vote on readmittance to the Union under the reign of Major General Schofield.

=== The occupations of Major General Nathaniel Banks (1862) ===
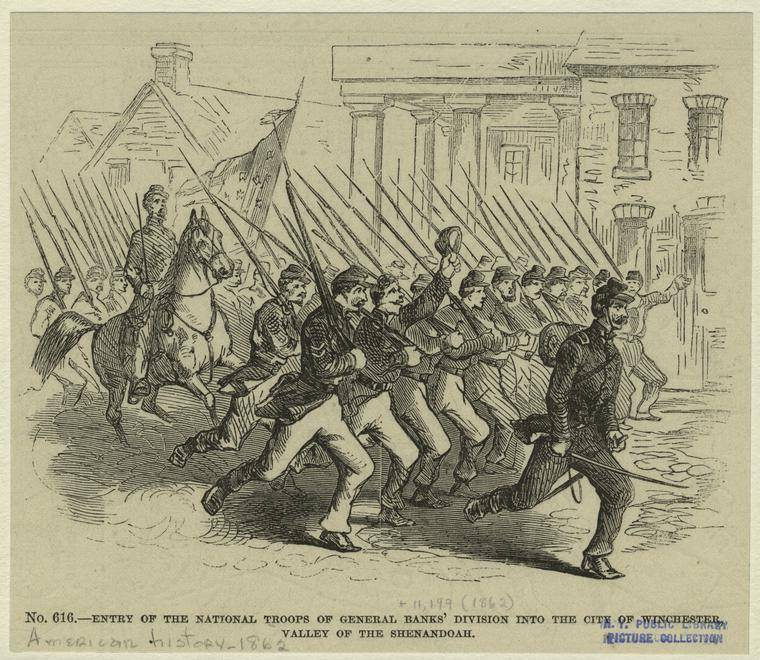
Entry of General Banks' Division, May, 1862

Major General Nanthniel Banks' primary objective in the Shenandoah Valley from 1861 to 1862 was to defend Washington, D.C., from possible attack by the Confederates, as well as defend and protect the Baltimore and Ohio Railroad. During the winter of 1861, Banks headquartered his troops of the V Corps in Frederick, Maryland. A pontoon bridge crossing the Potomac River was completed in early March 1862, allowing Banks to begin crossing and marching up the Shenandoah Valley with superior forces against Major General Stonewall Jackson. Major General Jackson evacuated Winchester, retreating up the Valley.

During the summer of 1862, two major battles were fought in Winchester between Banks and Jackson:

During Banks first occupation from (March May 12 to 25, 1862):

- The First Battle of Kernstown, March 23, 1862
- The First Battle of Winchester, May 25, 1862

Following the First Battle of Winchester, Banks retreated down the Valley. Shortly thereafter, by May 31, Major Gen. Jackson departed Winchester up the Valley (southwest) and Banks re-entered the town, occupying it with forces from June 4 to September 2, 1862).

=== The occupation of Major General Robert Milroy (1862–63) ===
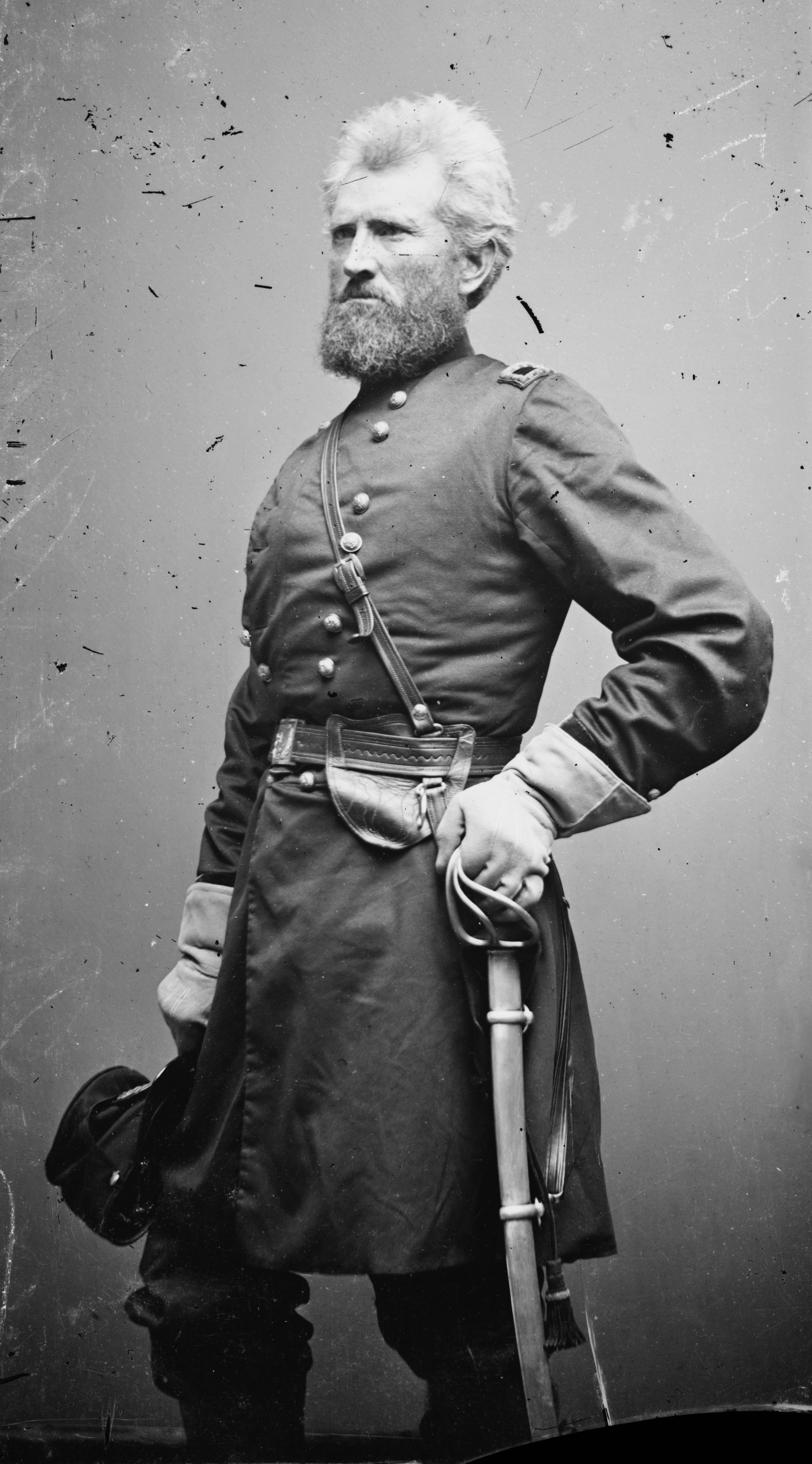
Major General Robert Milroy

Winchester was occupied by the 2nd Division of the VIII Corps of the Federal Middle Department from December 24, 1862, until the Second Battle of Winchester on June 15, 1863. The primary objectives of the Federals during this period were to protect and defend military approaches to Washington, D.C., and especially to guard and defend the Baltimore and Ohio Railroad from Confederate Raids. Major General Robert Milroy, commander of the 2nd Division, entered in force at the beginning of the year in 1863, coincidental with the enactment of the Emancipation Proclamation. Milroy, a radical abolitionist, was intent on using Winchester as a place to enforce this new proclamation in the strictest and harshest terms possible. Major General Milroy is most famous for his edict that:

In this city (Winchester) of about 6,000 inhabitants ... my will is absolute law – none dare contradict or dispute my slightest word or wish. The secesh here have heard many terrible stories about me before I came and supposed me to be a perfect Nero for cruelty and blood, and many of them both male and female tremble when they come into my presence to ask for small privileges, but the favors I grant them are slight and few for I confess I feel a strong disposition to play the tyrant among these traitors.

— Robert H. Milroy

Milroy was noted for his harsh treatment of women. When Milroy felt that a lady had "insulted Gen Closeret ... her fine mansion was immediately taken for a hospital." In one particularly disturbing incident, on April 4, Major General Milroy arrested Mrs. Logan on charges of possessing contraband, and had her and her daughters escorted to the outskirts of town, without time to even gather medicine for one ill daughter, and "exiled" from Winchester. He then moved his wife, Mrs. Milroy, into what was one of the finest and most exquisite homes in Winchester. Ladies of Winchester eventually took to walking in the middle of the streets rather than risk accidentally brushing up against Federal soldiers. Milroy summarized his sentiments toward the ladies in town by noting that:

Hell is not full enough, there must be more of these Secession women of Winchester to fill it up.

— Robert H. Milroy

Most notably, Milroy was feared for his rash desire to execute Virginians, and his reputation for this from previous Alleghany campaigning precede him, striking great trepidation in the town, as Milroy set up his tribunals, without constitutional authority, and sentenced townsfolk to execution by firing squad.

Many of the local blacks freed in January 1863 under the Emancipation Proclamation fled the area, presumably fearing reconquest by the Confederates (as in fact happened later in the year).

=== The "burning" and occupation of Major General Philip Sheridan (1864) ===
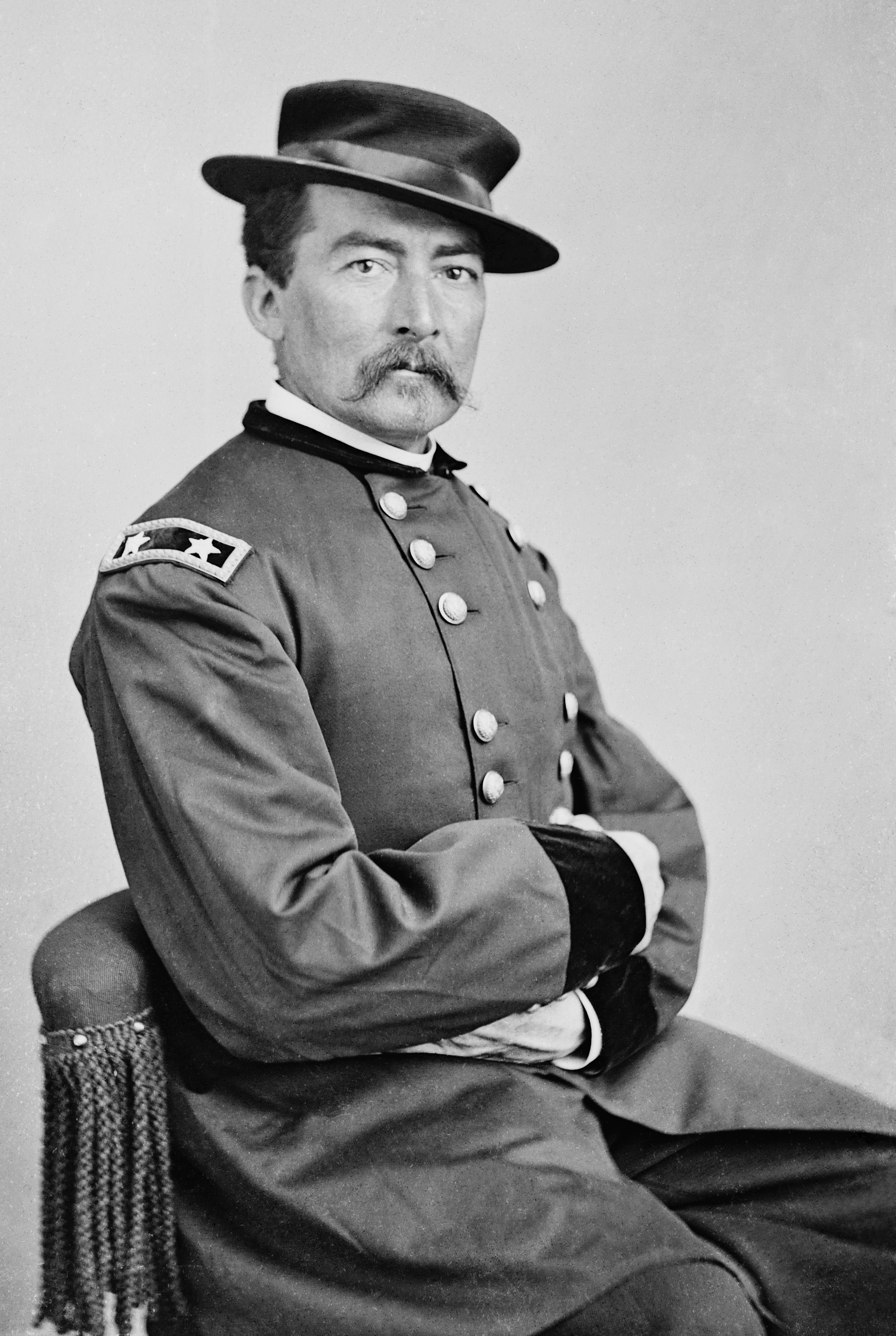
Maj. Gen. Philip Sheridan

Major General Philip Sheridan aggressively marched up the Valley from Winchester and destroyed "2,000 barns filled with grain and implements, not to mention other outbuildings, 70 mills filled with wheat and flour" and "numerous head of livestock," according to the Official Records. At the end of 1864, Sheridan stated, "The crow that flies over the Valley of Virginia must henceforth carry his rations with him".

== People and events ==
=== Confederate units ===
Winchester and Frederick County fielded five infantry companies, six cavalry companies and one artillery battery, as well as two regiments of militia. The units were assigned to or operated under the auspices of what was ultimately called the Army of Northern Virginia, which was also known as the Department of Northern Virginia:

Infantry:

- 2nd Virginia Infantry, Company F (Winchester Riflemen)
- 5th Virginia Infantry, Company A (Marion Rifles)
- 5th Virginia Infantry, Company K (Continental Morgan Guards)
- 13th Virginia Infantry, Company H (Fort Loudoun Guards)
- 33rd Virginia Infantry, Company D (Mountain Rangers)

Cavalry:

- 1st Virginia Cavalry, Company A (Newtown Light Dragoons)
- 11th Virginia Cavalry, Company H
- 12th Virginia Cavalry, Company C
- 18th Virginia Cavalry, Company F
- 23rd Virginia Cavalry, Company K
- 39th Virginia Cavalry, Company A

Artillery

- Jackson Virginia (Winchester) Artillery Company (Cutshaw's Battery)

Militia

- 31st Regiment, Virginia Militia
- 51st Regiment, Virginia Militia

=== Contribution to military medicine ===
In spite of Winchester's wartime hardships, a few residents made great contributions to the Confederate cause, such as Dr. Hunter McGuire, the chief surgeon of the Second Corps of the Army of Northern Virginia, who laid foundations for the future Geneva Conventions regarding the treatment of medical doctors during warfare. Winchester served as a major center for Confederate medical operations, particularly after the Battle of Sharpsburg in 1862 and the Battle of Gettysburg in 1863, and set the stage for advancements in the practice of medicine internationally and during combat operations.

Winchester Medical College, at which Hunter McGuire was a professor and his father the founder president, was deliberately burned in 1862 by the Union troops of General Nathaniel Banks in retaliation for what had happened to John Brown and his men. It never reopened.

=== The "Devil Diarists" of Winchester ===
Many citizens of Winchester recorded diaries of events during the war. U.S. Secretary of War Edwin Stanton summarized his impression of Winchester after visiting there by noting that "the men are all in the army" and "the women are the devil," and Major General Milroy said, "Hell is not full enough.... There must be more of these Secession women of Winchester to fill it up." Noted diary accounts include:

- Portia Baldwin Baker – As the Union Army destroyed the Winchester Academy and a Quaker Church, Portia remarked, "They are foot by foot and plank by plank destroying our property".
- Julia Chase – Born in Maine in 1831, she moved to Winchester when her father became the U.S. Postmaster, and her home was on Loudoun Street & Fairfax Lane. Julia was a Unionist, and witnessed the mistreatment of Winchester loyalists by Confederate authorities, including the arrest of her elderly father. After three years of witnessing Union defeats and disappointments, she celebrated the "glorious" victory of Sheridan's army at the Third Battle of Winchester in 1864.
- Laura Lee – Laura was the daughter of Daniel Lee, who served in the Virginia House of Delegates and as the Frederick County Clerk. Laura supported secession and resided in the home of her sister-in-law, Mary Greenhow Lee.
- Mary Greenhow Lee – Born to a wealthy family in Richmond in 1819, her father, Robert Greenhow was the mayor of Richmond, Virginia. She married Laura's brother, Hugh Holmes Lee in 1843, who was a lawyer in Winchester. A pro-Secessionist, Mary was "banished" from Winchester on February 23, 1865, by Maj. Gen. Sheridan, and she never returned, living in Richmond and then Baltimore, Maryland.
- Cornelia Peake McDonald – Cornelia was married to a Winchester lawyer, Angus McDonald III, who was 23 years her senior and served as a colonel in the Confederate Army. Cornelia is noted for tenderly caretaking for one of her slaves who had run away to the North, only to return willingly after mistreatment with the Union Army. Her home was ultimately used as a hospital.
- Kate Sperry – Born in 1843 in Winchester, Kate married Dr. Enoch Hunt who was a regimental surgeon in the 2nd Mississippi Regiment of the Confederate Army. Kate was a Pro-Secessionist, and is famous for her vow, "Surrender? Never Surrender".

=== Presidential combatants ===
Among those who took part in battles at Winchester were future U.S. presidents William McKinley and Rutherford B. Hayes, who both were officers in the U. S. Army of West Virginia.

== Fortifications and posts in Winchester ==
=== Primary redoubts and forts ===
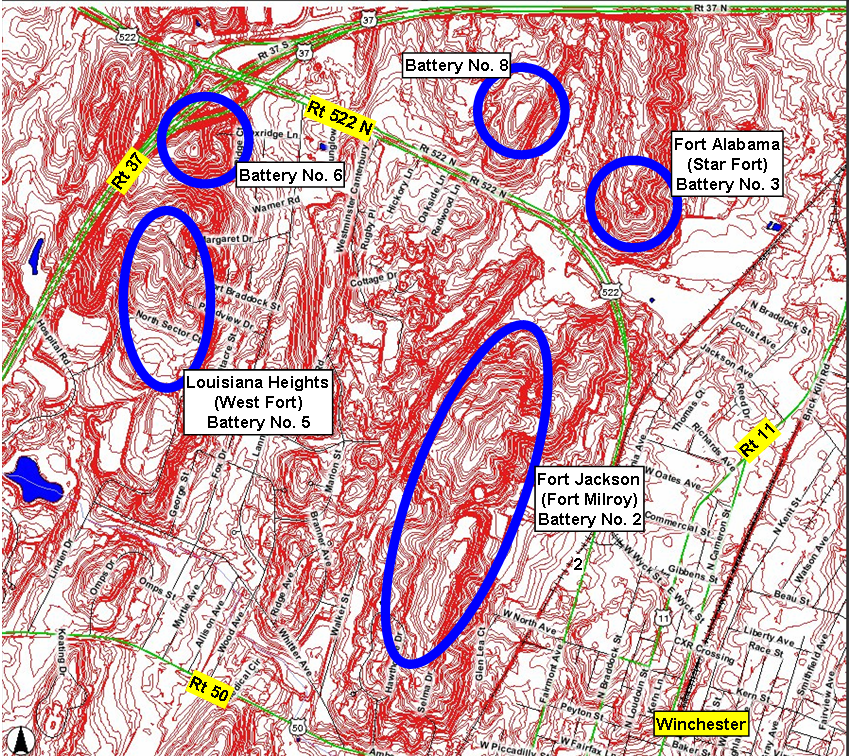
Major General Milroy's defensive fortifications in Winchester, Virginia in June, 1863.

Winchester was heavily fortified by forts and lunettes circumferencing the town, as well as along the outlying turnpike routes entering town. Within Winchester Milroy constructed or improved upon a total of ten defensive fortifications numbered Battery No. 1 through Battery No. 10, making improvements on many pre-existing forts and fortifications left by prior Confederate and Federal occupations. The fortifications were linked in places with roads and trenches.

- Fort Collier: Built by Confederate Lieutenant Collier and Virginia militia with the aid of Federal prisoners, this redoubt guarded the north entrance of town on the east side of the Martinsburg Pike. During later Federal occupations, it was known as Battery No. 10. The fort was constructed on low ground and was dependent upon artillery support from other forts in the area to be effective. It served as a fortified position blocking Union forces advancing up the pike. At the Third Battle of Winchester, Sheridan's cavalry flanked this position and overran the fort and captured two artillery pieces from Chapman's Virginia Battery.
- Fort Jackson: This was originally built by Confederate troops and called the "fortification on the heights" or the "Main Fort" and was improved under Major General Banks and called "Fort Garibaldi" by the 39th New York regiment. The redoubt was improved extensively by Milroy's troops as Battery No. 2 and held 14 guns, including heavy artillery, and renamed Fort Milroy. Its current name was given after the Confederate victory in the Second Battle of Winchester.
- Fort Alabama: This was a large star-shaped lunette built by Federal troops in 1862 that was improved by Milroy as Battery No. 3 (Star Fort) and equipped with 8 guns and outlying rifle trenches. Its current name was given after the Confederate victory in the Second Battle of Winchester.
- Louisiana Heights: This was a 3 gun lunette and redans located due west of Fort Jackson which was occupied by Milroy as Battery No. 5 (called West Fort). It included a line of rifle trenches. Its current name was given after the assault by Confederate Louisiana troops in the Second Battle of Winchester.
- Carysbrooke Redoubt: A redoubt on high ground anchoring the east end of approximately two miles of earthworks which guarded the south side of Camp Russell (Union). The earthworks straddled the Valley Pike south of Winchester (south of modern VA 37 termination into Interstate 81), and Carysbrooke Redoubt was located east of the pike.
- Parkins Mill Battery: A lunette with small fort 4 miles south of Winchester at the Opequon river crossing on Front Royal turnpike (modern VA 522).

=== Fortified batteries ===
- Bower's Hill: A linear entrenchment along Bower's Hill south of Fort Jackson. Major General Banks attempted and failed to hold this defensively in the First Battle of Winchester. From the hill, Major General Jubal Early and Lieuteant General Ewell surveyed their flanking maneuvers in the Second Battle of Winchester and bombarded Major General Milroy's troops.
- Battery No. 1: A 6 gun lunette with infantry flanks on the south end of Fort Jackson (Fort Milroy), co-located on the same ridge line.
- Battery No. 4: A large star 6 gun lunette with rifle entrenchments and minor lunettes, located due north of Fort Alabama (Star Fort) along the same ridge line (north of modern VA 37). The rifle entrenchments between Battery No. 4 and Fort Alabama have been destroyed by the overlaying construction of VA 37.
- Battery No. 6: A small lunette with 3 guns and rifle trenches on a hill peak located in between Louisiana Heights (West Fort) and Battery 7 (located on the southeast corner of VA 37 and VA 522).
- Battery No. 7: A large 8 gun lunette and redans with trench lines on Apple Pie Ridge west of Apple Pie Ridge Road (on modern James Wood High School grounds).
- Battery No. 8: A grouping of a lunette and redans with infantry works west of Fort Alabama (Battery 3) and east of Battery No. 7.
- Battery No. 9: The location is unknown, but this may have been a lunette.

=== Camps ===
- Camp Hill: A Confederal and Federal camp located in the modern Overlook Park on the south side of Winchester east of South Loudoun Street.
- Smithfield Trench Line: This was a mile-long Confederate trench line with ramparts built in a 90-degree angle northwest of Winchester and south of Fort Collier that was used during the Third Battle of Winchester.
- Camp Russell: Camp Russell was a two mile long encampment with earthworks and trenches straddling the Valley Pike south of Winchester, just south of the intersection of modern VA 37 and Interstate 81. Carysbrooke Redoubt formed a part of this encampment.
- Camp Sheridan: Camp Sheridan and two accompanying small forts were located southwest of Winchester (centered on the intersection of modern Middle Road and Apple Valley Road). One fort was located west of the Middle Road and Apple Valley Road intersection, and the second fort was located just north of modern Firelock Court on Middle Road.
- CSA Camp: A Confederate encampment was located north of the Northwest Turnpike along modern Spinning Wheel Lane.
- Federal Camp: A Federal encampment was located north of the Northwest Turnpike along modern Echo Lane.

=== Field hospitals ===
- Sheridan Field Hospital: This was a field hospital used by Major General Sheridan on the southeastern corner of town on Opequon Avenue, near Hollingsworth Drive. It was the largest field hospital operated by the Federals during the Civil War.
- White Sulphur Resort: also known as Jordan Springs, was a hotel and resort facility built by the property owner Branch Jordan in 1843 and 1855. The hotel operation's ceased during the war, when it was used by both sides as a hospital. The buildings remain to this day on Jordan Springs Road in Stephenson, Virginia, just north of Winchester.

=== Field prisons ===
- Old Court House: The Old Court House in downtown Winchester was used as both a temporary prison and field hospital by both sides during the war.

=== Headquarters ===
- Stonewall Jackson's Headquarters: This house, which belonged to Colonel Moore of the Virginia Militia, is preserved as the Stonewall Jackson Headquarters Museum today. Located at 415 North Braddock Street, it served as the winter headquarters for Stonewall Jackson during 1861 and 1862.
- General Philip H. Sheridan's Headquarters: Sheridan utilized the Logan family home as his headquarters during the latter part of the 1864 Shenandoah Valley campaign. Sheridan began his famous ride here to rally his troops to victory at Cedar Creek on October 19, 1864. The home is located at 135 N. Braddock St.

== Civil War tourism ==
Today, Winchester provides a wealth of exploration and tourism for Civil War enthusiasts. Jubal Early Drive snakes around south of downtown Winchester, along the central location for many of the battles.

Civil War Tourism Sites:

- Cedar Creek and Belle Grove National Historical Park (1797)
- Journey Through Hallowed Ground National Heritage Area
- Museum of the Shenandoah Valley
- Old Court House Civil War Museum (1840)
- Stonewall Cemetery (1866)
- Stonewall Jackson's Headquarters Museum (1861)
- Winchester Confederate Cemetery
- Winchester National Cemetery (1866)
- Kernstown Battlefield (1862–1865)

== Flag of Winchester ==
Winchester Flag

The modern flag of the city of Winchester closely resembles the first congressionally-proposed national flag of the Confederate States of America. Both flags were composed of a field of red, upon which a saltire (Saint Andrew's Cross) is laid, with a heraldic shield in the center of the flag. The primary differences in the flags are the addition of a center blue saltire, and an English "Norman" lion instead of a 13-pointed star on the shield in the Winchester flag. The Confederate Congress failed to accept the flag proposal of the Joint Committee on Flag and Seal in April 1862, and went on to adopt the "Stars and Bars" flag.

== See also ==
- Journey Through Hallowed Ground National Heritage Area
