= James Battle Avirett =

American Confederate Army chaplain (1835–1912)

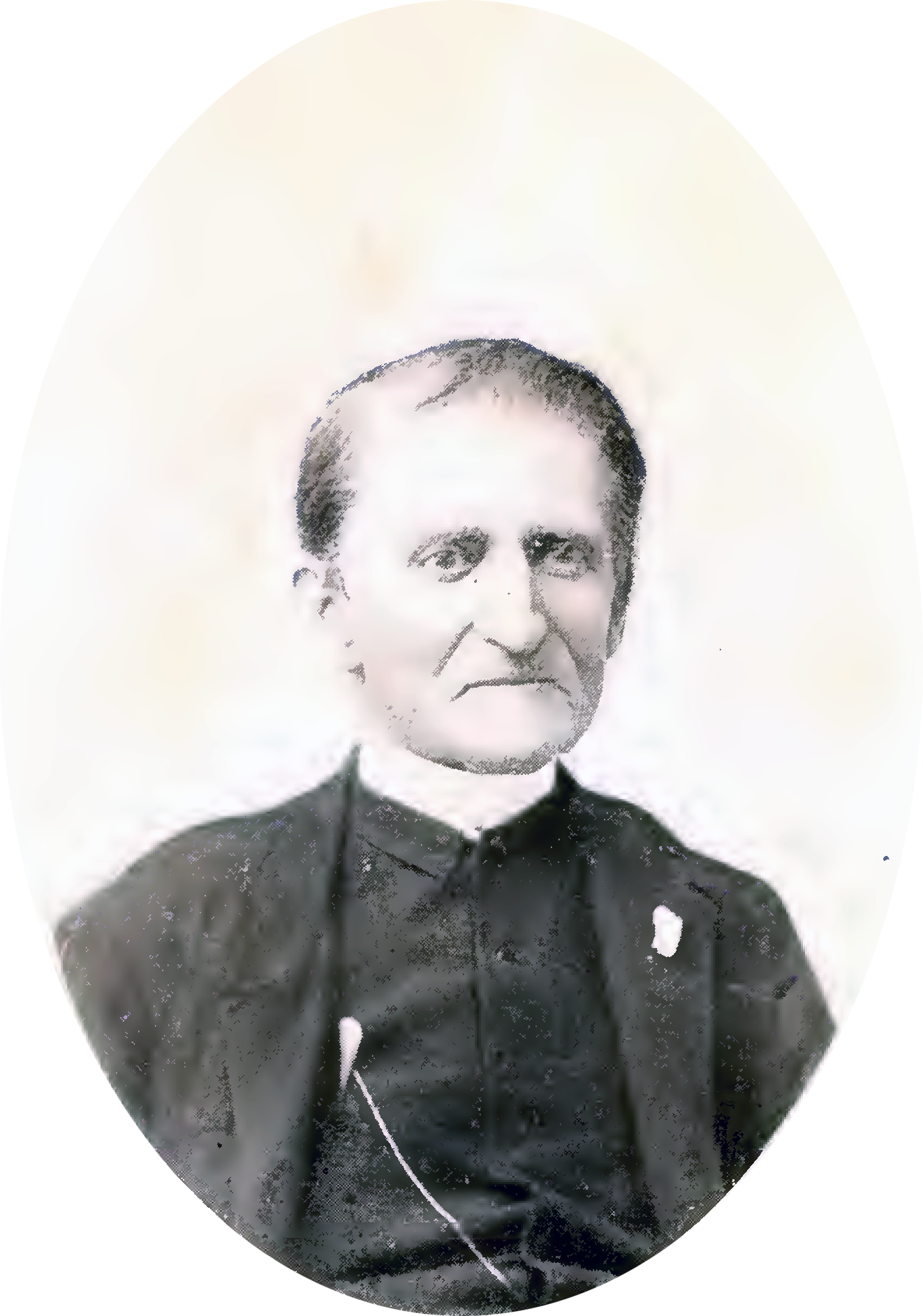
- Born: March 12, 1835; Richlands, Onslow County, North Carolina, U.S.
- Died: February 16, 1912 (aged 76); Cumberland, Maryland, U.S.
- Resting place: Winchester, Virginia, U.S.
- Education: University of North Carolina at Chapel Hill
- Children: John W. Avirett, Philip W. Avirett
- Parent(s): John Alfred Averitt; Serena Thomas

James Battle Avirett (March 12, 1835 – February 16, 1912) was an American Confederate chaplain and author. He was the first chaplain commissioned to serve in the Confederate States Army in 1861. His The Old Plantation: How We Lived in Great House and Cabin before the War, published in 1901 was a nostalgic description of life on a plantation in the Antebellum South. By the time of his death, he was "the last surviving Confederate chaplain."

== Early life ==
James Battle Avirett was born on March 12, 1835, in Richlands, North Carolina. On his paternal side, he was of German-Huguenot descent. His father, John Alfred Alvirett, was a large planter and sheriff of Onslow County, North Carolina. He grew up on the Avirett-Stephens Plantation.

Avirett attended the University of North Carolina at Chapel Hill from 1850 to 1852. He was ordained as an Episcopal priest by Bishop William Meade in 1861.

== Career ==
Avirett was a priest of the Episcopal Church. During the American Civil War of 1861–1865, he served as a chaplain in the Confederate States Army in Alabama, under General Turner Ashby. He was the first chaplain to be commissioned to serve in the CSA in 1861.

Avirett served as the president of the Dunbar Institute, an Episcopal female seminary in Winchester, Virginia from 1865 to 1871. For the next twenty-five years, he was a priest in Sligo, North Carolina, Upper Marlboro and Silver Spring, Maryland, followed by Waterville, New York. He served as the rector of St Paul's Church Louisburg, North Carolina from 1894 to 1899.

Avirett was the author of several books. As early as 1867, he wrote a memoir of General Turner Ashby, after he had given a speech about Ashby at the University of Virginia. By 1897, he wrote two religious pamphlets.

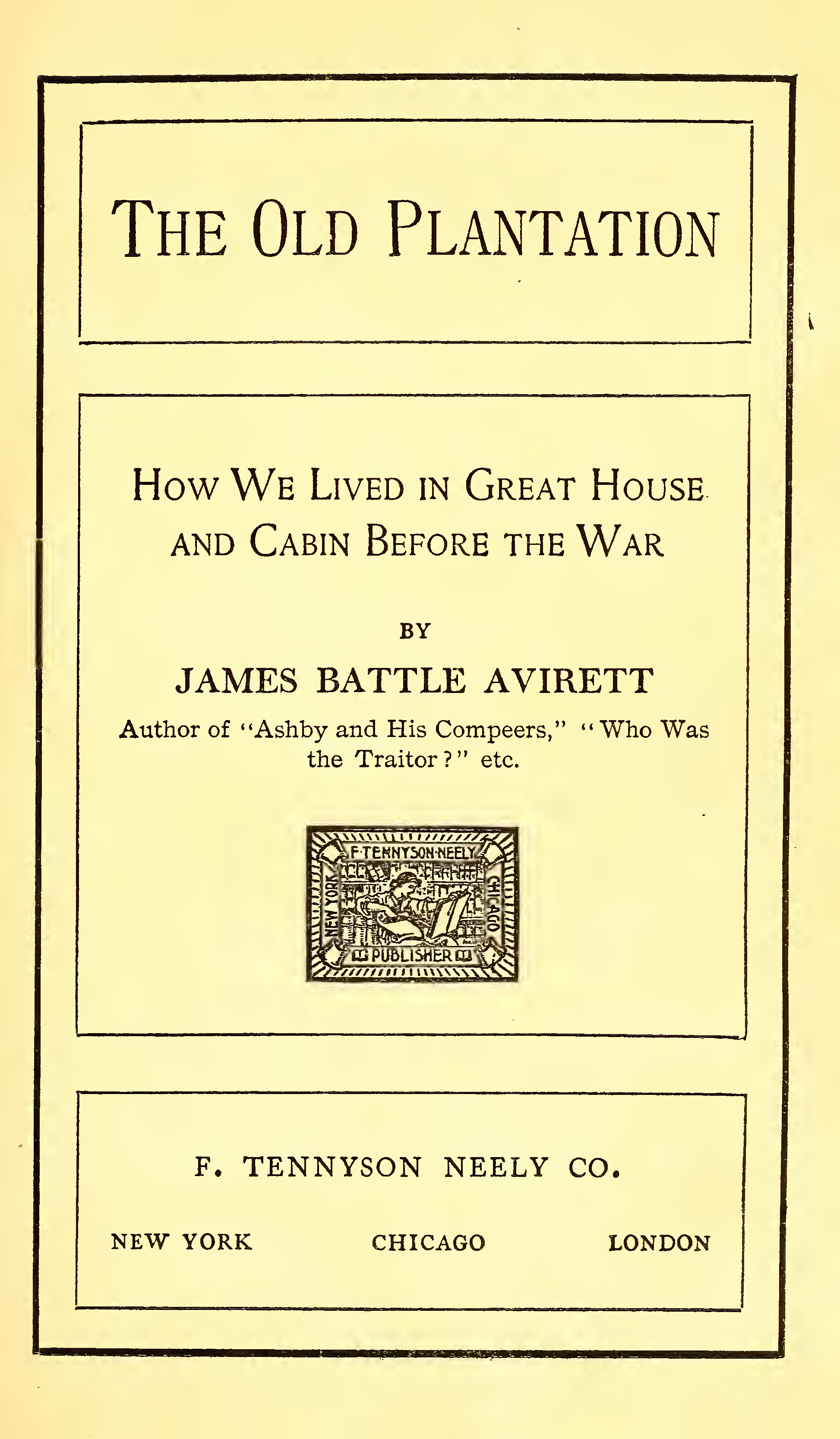

Avirett published The Old Plantation: How We Lived in Great House and Cabin before the War in 1901. He had been encouraged to write about plantation life by Senator Zebulon Baird Vance. Prefaced by Hunter McGuire, it was presented as a response to Uncle Tom's Cabin. For David Anderson, a senior lecturer in cultural and political studies at Swansea University, the book was emblematic of nostalgic memoirs about the Old South, which was lost forever except in writing and memories. However, David Goldfield, a professor of history at the University of North Carolina at Charlotte, suggests that it was "much less a re-creation of plantation life than a fantasy, part of the full-blown rehabilitation of the Old South that had been underway since the end of Reconstruction."

Avirett was a regular contributor to the Cumberland Evening Times, a newspaper in Cumberland, Maryland.

== Personal life ==
Avirett married Mary Louise Dunbar Williams of Winchester, Virginia, in 1862. His wife was a driving force in the establishment of the Stonewall Cemetery, a Confederate cemetery near the Mount Hebron Cemetery and Gatehouse in Winchester, Virginia. The couple had two sons, John Williams Avirett (1863–1914), who was the owner of the Cumberland Evening Times, and Philip Williams Avirett (1867–1902), a lawyer and newspaper editor.

== Death ==
Avirett died on February 16, 1912, in Cumberland, Maryland. By the time of his death, he was the last surviving Confederate chaplain. He was buried in Winchester, Virginia.

== Bibliography ==
- The Memoirs of General Turner Ashby and His Compeers (1867).
- Watchman, What of the Night? or The Causes Affecting Church Growth (1897).
- Who Was the Rebel ? (1897).
- The Old Plantation: How We Lived in Great House and Cabin before the War (1901).
