= Winchester Medical College =

American university burned in the Civil War

The Winchester Medical College (WMC) building, currently located at 302 W. Boscawen Street, Winchester, Virginia, along with all its records, equipment, museum, and library, was burned on May 16, 1862, by Union troops occupying the city. This was "retaliation for the dissection of cadavers from John Brown's Raid". More specifically, it was in retaliation for the desecration they discovered of one of those cadavers, the body of one of John Brown's sons, identified years later as Watson. The body of John Brown's son, fighting against slavery in the raid on Harpers Ferry, had been dishonored: made into an anatomical specimen in the College's museum, with the label "Thus always with Abolitionists" (mirroring Thus Always to Tyrants, the motto of the Commonwealth of Virginia). In addition, students at the school collected and then dissected the bodies of three other members of Brown's troop (John Anthony Copeland Jr., Shields Green, Jeremiah Anderson) and a black boy was apparently tortured and killed there for favoring the Union.

The College never reopened.

== Winchester and secessionism ==
According to the Encyclopedia of Virginia, "during the [Civil] war and after, Winchester enjoyed a reputation as a secessionist stronghold." Support for Southern slavery was therefore also strong. As in other Southern cities, there were some who opposed slavery and supported the Union, but they kept their heads down and their mouths shut. In any visible way Winchester, including its politicians, professionals, and intellectuals, was pro-slavery. Frederick County, alongside the Piedmont region of Virginia, was among the areas where secessionist sentiment was strongest in the state. From the Union point of view, Winchester was "a hot bed of treason".

=== Senator James M. Mason ===
The most important man in Winchester in the Antebellum period was three-term Virginia Senator James M. Mason (1798–1871), owner of the estate Selma, overlooking the city. Mason, who "spent his long career fighting against change," represented Virginia in Congress from 1837 until he was expelled in March 1861 for supporting the Confederacy. Mason's commitment to slavery can be concluded from the fact that he wrote the Fugitive Slave Act of 1850, arguably the most hated and openly evaded federal legislation in the nation's history. He was the Chair of the Senate Select Committee investigating John Brown's raid and wrote its report, informally known as "the Mason report". He was also the Confederacy's leading diplomat, having been chairman of the Senate Foreign Relations Committee. In 1861 the Confederacy sent him to Europe in an unsuccessful attempt to obtain diplomatic recognition or financial help from England or France (see Trent Affair).

Mason, the politician most identified with the "old South", was not only a white supremacist—most white Southerners and many Northerners were—, he believed that negroes were "the great curse of the country". Giving Blacks the vote particularly offended him; it was, he thought, the rule of the mob and the "end of the republic." Mason did not consider it "expedient or wise...to educate the Negro race at all, bond or free," and thought that freeing the slaves "would end...in their relapsing into utter and brutal barbarism." He opposed the "colonization project"—sending free blacks to Africa—as he believed, and said publicly, that they were much better off as American slaves. In short, Mason believed bondage was the best place for blacks. "Mason had a paternalistic relationship with the few slaves whom he owned, and he made the mistake of assuming that kindness and generosity were the norm for Southern slave holders."

Mr. Mason's residence became an object of much curiosity, and as a guard was detailed from the Thirteenth to protect the premises, we had an opportunity of becoming distantly acquainted with his family. Their sentiments were of the rabid kind. They believed a dead Yankee was the best kind of a Yankee. We did our best, by good nature and politeness, to remove their impressions; but it was no go, as the gangrene of contempt had too deeply affected their minds to allow a change of heart.

Union troops in Winchester at first used Selma for regimental offices. The lower officers might not have known who Mason was, but they soon learned. In the first religious service after occupying Winchester, held in the square in front of the courthouse, Chaplain Noah Gaylord from the courthouse steps addressed "a large assemblage of citizens and soldiers[,] beside[s] our own regiment", and "preached a rattling sermon on the evils of secession":

I think he must have forgot it was the Sabbath when he spoke of Senator Mason. He called him a traitor and everything but what was good; he told his hearers that he had dragooned the people of Virginia into this rebellion, and it was such as he, and his kind, that had got the whole South drawn in.

Furthermore, the general in charge of the Union troops was Nathaniel Banks, former Speaker of the House of Representatives and Governor of Massachusetts, who sought the Republican 1860 vice presidential nomination, with Salmon Chase. Banks knew perfectly who Mason was and what he stood for.

Once the Union men using Selma learned that Northerners viewed Mason with "disdain and hatred", that they "reviled him", they proceeded to destroy his house, using pick-axes. The entire roof was removed, some time later the walls were pulled over, and anything burnable was chopped into firewood. They did their work so thoroughly that "from turret to foundation stone, not one stone remains upon another; the negro houses, the out-buildings [there was an ice house], the fences are all gone, and even the trees are many of them girdled". Stone from the foundation was used to build Star Fort, nearby. As Mason wrote later, it was "destroyed, or rather obliterated". Mason never lived in Winchester again. After his return to the U.S. in 1868—he was in exile in Canada—and living in Arlington, Virginia, he made a point of not hiring any negroes for household labor, going to some trouble to get whites for these positions.

=== Hugh and Hunter McGuire, father and son physicians ===
The second most influential man in Winchester was arguably Hugh Holmes McGuire (1801–1875), founder of the Winchester Medical College; he was certainly the most distinguished doctor in northern Virginia. "Although well advanced in years [he was 60], Dr. McGuire was with the cause so heartily that he accepted a commission as surgeon in the Confederate Army, and had charge of the hospitals at Greenwood and Lexington."

Even more a devotee of the Southern cause was his son Hunter Holmes McGuire (1835–1900), a graduate of and briefly professor of anatomy at the College. At the time of John Brown's execution he was studying medicine in Philadelphia, as many Southern students did. He was "acutely upset" that John Brown's body would travel through Philadelphia, where according to an announcement it would be embalmed. (In fact Brown's body did not stop in Philadelphia, and it was embalmed in New York; to distract the crowd a sham coffin was taken off the train on which his widow was travelling.) He organized a movement through which three hundred medical students attending the University of Pennsylvania and Jefferson Medical College, including him, left Philadelphia en masse on December 21st, 1859, on a "very large" special train for Richmond, paid for by the Medical College of Virginia. They were received there with "great enthusiasm" by an "immense throng", and addressed by Governor Wise.

When the war arrived, he became medical director of the Confederate Army of the Shenandoah and the personal physician of Confederate Generals Stonewall Jackson and Jubal Early. "During the 1890s he headed a Confederate veterans association committee that analyzed history textbooks to make sure that the Southern viewpoint was presented fully and correctly." In 1907 he published in a book papers sponsored by the Grand Camp of Confederate Veterans of Virginia, supporting the Lost Cause tenets that "slavery [was] not the cause of the war" and that "the North [was] the aggressor in bringing on the war". The book quickly sold out and required a second edition.

=== Richard Parker ===
Richard Parker, the judge who, in nearby Charles Town, sentenced John Brown to death, lived in Winchester.

=== Stonewall Confederate Cemetery ===
The Stonewall Confederate Cemetery contains monuments from every Confederate state, plus Kentucky and Maryland, plus monuments to the unknown Confederate dead. At the dedication of the latter in 1879, Winchester invited racist Alabama senator John T. Morgan, who complained in his address of the Union plan to end slavery, "in defiance of the Constitution".

There are Confederate cemeteries all over the South, but they are almost all local. There are places with the flags of every Confederate state, such as the Confederate Memorial of the Wind and Stone Mountain. But a cemetery with a stone marker for each Confederate state, with burials of soldiers from each state: there is no other in Virginia, and only two others elsewhere (Marietta Confederate Cemetery and McGavock Confederate Cemetery, in Georgia and Tennessee respectively).

== The Winchester Medical College ==
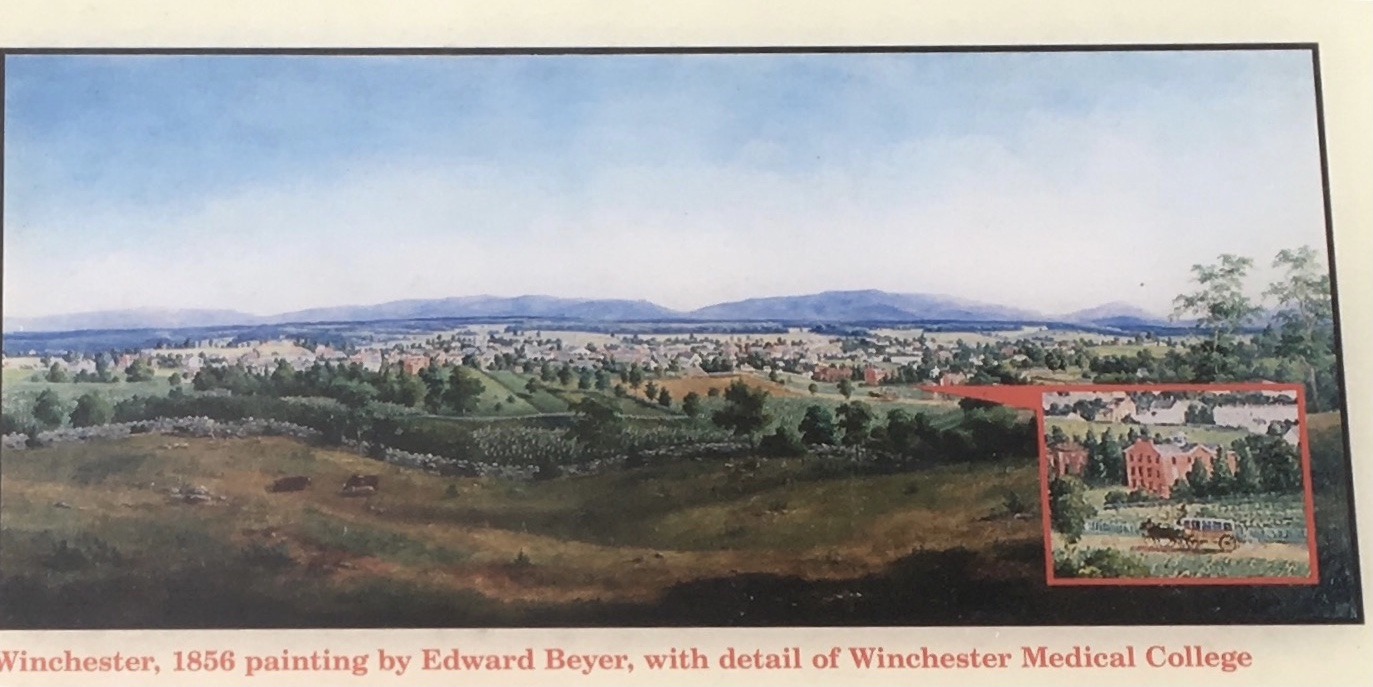
Winchester Medical College, Winchester, Virginia (detail). Note the white cupula over the glass dome.

The medical school in Winchester was the first in the state. The Medical College of the Valley of Virginia was incorporated December 30, 1825, by the Virginia General Assembly. It operated from 1826 to 1829. The location is not known, but it was not the same location as the Winchester Medical College, as Preservation Historic Winchester mistakenly suggests. A. Bentley Kinney offers what he calls an "educated guess": that it was "in a small brick office in the back yard of the McGuire home". the home survives and is still in use, at 103 North Braddock Street. Hugh Holmes McGuire was one of the three physicians on the staff. "It is also possible the early classes, which only had six or seven students, moved from the office of one faculty member to another, since they all lived within three blocks of each other, the article posits." The college closed after the senior physician, John Esten Cooke, left for Transylvania University.

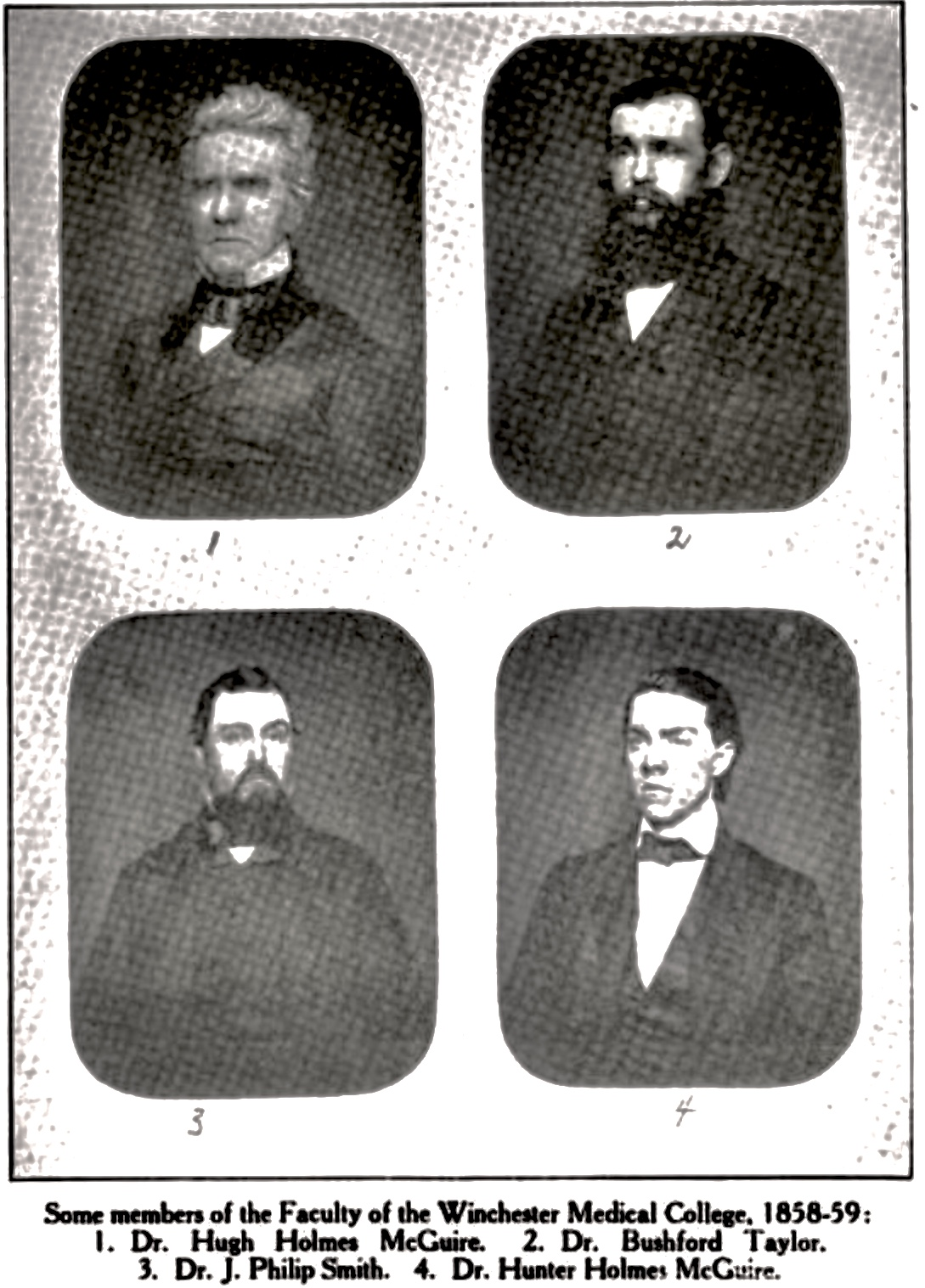
Faculty at Winchester Medical College

McGuire, 20 years later, would restart the medical school as the Winchester Medical College, incorporated March 11, 1847. The state Legislature loaned it $5,000 (equivalent to $172,768 in 2025), and later accepted ownership of the college as repayment for the loan. The college built a red brick building at the northwest corner of Boscawen and Stewart streets, near Mason's and McGuire's homes. It had an operating amphitheater with a large dome for light (daylight), two lecture halls, a dissecting room on the third floor, and a chemical laboratory, as well as a museum-library and offices. It graduated 72 students before it closed in 1861, soon to become a hospital, when Virginia seceded and joined the Confederacy, at the beginning of the Civil War, and all the students enlisted. Hugh's son, Hunter Holmes McGuire, began his medical studies there.

Like other Southern medical schools, most bodies used in the dissection laboratory were Black. The owner of a slave could do with his (doctors were less interested in female bodies) corpse whatever he wanted. Donating it to a medical college disposed of it without using slave time to dig a grave. However free Black corpses were also used, as grave robbers plundered African-American cemeteries and potter's fields where the poor were laid to rest. "The majority of cadavers were African-American—not because they were being targeted, but they were more vulnerable to grave-robbing. Municipal cemeteries—they were open, they were unguarded, whereas white folk of the time were buried in churches, [or] on their own property, and it was very difficult to steal them."

For this reason, the College was both feared and hated by the Blacks of Winchester. One Virginia student at the Winchester Medical College took evident satisfaction recounting the terror with which African-American inhabitants of the town regarded student doctors like himself, and boasted of his midnight raids on the graves of his black neighbors.

== Four bodies taken by Winchester Medical College ==
=== Those killed during the raid ===
Human bodies for student dissection were in short supply. (See Body snatchers.) They were only 30 miles (48 km) from Harpers Ferry, much closer than the next closest medical school, the Richmond Medical School, and there was a train every day. Hearing of the ten killed during the raid, some students went down to Harpers Ferry in search of bodies. An anatomy faculty member may have accompanied the students.

All sources report that the train stopped before Harpers Ferry, everyone had to get off, and the students found a body:

On leaving the train in Harpers Ferry before it reached the station the students came across a dead body lying on the banks of the river, and, always looking for material for dissection, they packed it in a box and shipped it back to Winchester. Papers found on the body after it arrived at the college proved it to be the body of Owen Brown, the son of John Brown. The body was prepared for dissection and used for teaching purposes.

Eventually they learned that Owen Brown was very much alive, and fighting in the Union army, so the body had to be of one of John Brown's two sons killed at Harpers Ferry, Watson or Oliver. (Letters of both written to their wives have been published.) They never knew the identity of the second body they took, Jeremiah Anderson, who was identified by writers on the Harpers Ferry events. There are statements that the body of John Henry Kagi was also taken to Winchester for dissection; but that thesis was dropped by the scholar that was advancing it. A plaque in North Elba says his remains are there, together with the others.

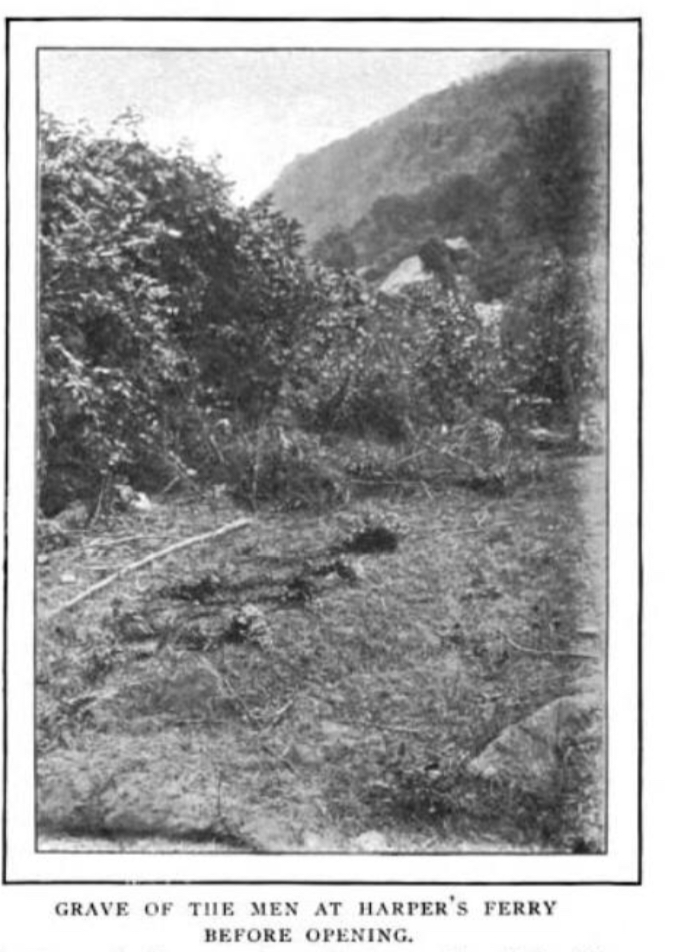
Original burial site of Oliver Brown and seven others killed at Harpers Ferry.

In any event, there being no refrigeration, the students could only take bodies that would be "used" right away. The remaining eight bodies of those killed during the raid, including that of Oliver Brown, were unwelcome in local cemeteries. After lying where they fell for over 24 hours, two Black men, James Mansfield and his brother-in-law James Giddy, for $10 stacked the corpses in a "gruesome pile", loaded them on a wagon, drove them to the burial site, then put them into two "packing boxes". These were buried without marker, clergy, or ceremony in "an unusual place" (so it would be forgotten): across the Shenandoah River from Harpers Ferry, in Loudoun County. Despite the lack of marker, one of the men who buried them, and two spectators, were still alive 40 years later, and in 1899 led those interested to the site. The remains were disinterred and reburied at the John Brown Farm in North Elba, New York, in a single casket, since the remains in most cases could not be matched with names.

The bodies of the son of Brown and Jeremiah Anderson were packed into barrels, and the empty space filled with formaldehyde. They were then taken by the students back on the train from Harpers Ferry to Winchester. Dr. William P. McGuire (1846–1926), son of Hugh Holmes McGuire and younger brother of Hunter Holmes McGuire, was a student and an eyewitness.

Mrs. Brown attempted to recover Watson's body, but was unsuccessful. "When Mrs. Brown was given the body of her husband after his execution, she was granted permission to search for the bodies of her sons. One of them was traced to a medical college near Winchester, Va. ...The family made some effort to obtain the body which was said to be in this medical college, but the feeling against the agitators was so bitter that they made no progress, and only excited prejudice and derision."

=== Those hanged in Charles Town ===
In addition to the 10 who died during the raid, seven others were captured, tried, convicted, and executed by hanging. In this case, since under Virginia law a month had to pass between sentence and execution, and the trials and sentences were widely reported, the potential availability of bodies was known well in advance.

On November 1, the day before John Brown's sentencing, Arthur E. Peticolas, an anatomy professor from the Medical College of Virginia (since 1968 part of Virginia Commonwealth University), wrote to Virginia Governor Henry A. Wise and Prosecutor Andrew Hunter requesting the heads of those executed in Charles Town, "for the collection in our museum", together with the bodies, if the latter could be transported for no more than $5 each. This was not unusual, and Wise agreed to it, adding that any who were hung should not be buried in Virginia.

==== John Brown's body ====
John Brown was executed on December 2. The physician Lewis Sayre wrote Governor Wise before the execution suggesting that Brown's body be given to a medical school for dissection, so as to avoid having the body paraded as a "hero martyr". Wise would have turned his body over to "surgeons" (anatomy professors), but "the abolitionist was far too famous and national sentiments were far too raw". The body was given to Mrs. Brown and she took it back to North Elba and buried it, not without some concern about Southern medical students in Philadelphia stealing the corpse.

==== Shields Green and John A. Copeland ====
Shields Green and John A. Copeland, both Black, were hung, along with 2 whites, on December 16. "They will be interred to-morrow on the spot where the gallows stands, though there is a party of medical students here from Winchester who will doubtless not allow them to remain there long."

Copeland's parents read in a newspaper that their son's body was at the Winchester Medical College awaiting dissection. Governor Wise, whom they contacted, telegrammed that as free Blacks, they could not enter the state of Virginia, but they could send a white representative. James Monroe, from Oberlin, at their request went to inquire. The professors in the medical school unanimously agreed to return the body. However, a student representative called on Monroe and said that the faculty could not return the body because it was not theirs to return, it belonged to the students who had gotten it:

"Sah," said he, "these gentlemen and I have been appointed a committee by the medical students to explain this matter to you. It is evident to us, sah, that you don't understand the facts in the case. Sah, this nigger that you are trying to get don't belong to the Faculty. He isn't theirs to give away. They had no right to promise him to you. He belongs to us students, sah. Me and my chums nearly had to fight to get him. The Richmond medical students came to Charlestown determined to have him. I stood over the grave with a revolver in my hand while my chums dug him up. Now, sah, after risking our lives in this way, for the Faculty to attempt to take him from us is mo' 'an we can b'ar. You must see, sah, and the Faculty must see, that if you persist in trying to carry out the arrangement you have made, it will open the do' for all sorts of trouble. We have been told that Governor Wise gave you permission to come into this State and get this nigger. Governor Wise, sah, has nothing to do with the matter. He has no authority over the affairs of our college. We repudiate any interference on his part. Now, sah, that the facts are befo' you, we trust that we can go away with your assurance that you will abandon the enterprise on which you came to our town. Such an assurance is necessary to give quiet to our people."

The students had already broken into the dissection lab, stolen the bodies, and hidden them.

=== A cemetery discovered ===
In 1928, a barn was razed on the farm of "wealthy farmer and fruit grower" Edward W. Cather, presumably near Cather's Farm Market, on Route 50 west of Winchester. While excavations to build a house were underway, a cemetery was found underneath the foundation of the former barn. In it there were not bodies or skeletons but loose human bones, enough of them to assemble several skeletons. "It is generally accepted that the bones were those of bodies dissected many years ago by students of the old Winchester Medical College." There was no identification with the bones and WMC's records were burned along with its building, so there is no way of knowing if any of the bones were from one of Brown's African American raiders. There is also no note on what was done with the bones after they were dug up in 1928.

== What the Union soldiers found at the College ==
On March 11, 1862, the forces of then–Major Thomas "Stonewall" Jackson abandoned Winchester. When Union troops, under the command of General Nathaniel Banks, entered the city on the 12th, they found the Winchester Medical College empty. No lectures had been given "for a twelvemonth past", and in the summer of 1861 it had been used as a field hospital "by [Gen. Joseph E.] Johnston".

Union troops found two things in the medical college which horrified and angered them.

=== A Black boy tortured ===
"On Sunday last [March 15, 1862] considerable excitement was caused by the discovery of the remains of a negro boy, about seven years of age, in the dissecting room of the College. The head had been removed, the feet cut off and the body mutilated, and although the College had not been occupied for many months, it was evident that the boy had not been dead more than a week." Another report says the boy was 14, and was shot because he was "very jubilant to think that Union troops were so near the town. A rebel soldier seeing him in such extasies about it shot him dead on the spot."

His body was taken to the College; the soldier reporting said that it had been given to the doctors and the students; since the College was closed these were presumably the ones that lived in Winchester, as the McGuires did. Anatomical study would not explain the removal of his head, not typical of skeletal or anatomy studies. No more does it explain that his arms were cut off at the elbows, his legs at the knees, and his belly "ripped open lengthwise". It does not sound like the work of a doctor or medical student.

The best interpretation is that if the boy were already dead, this was just a gory display for the arriving Union doctors and soldiers to see. If the boy were still alive, it was torture. The College would have been examined immediately by the Union doctors and other officers, as they did all buildings in Winchester, in serious need of accommodation and hospital beds. The only possible explanation, given the known information, is that his body was left there in this condition to send a hateful message to the Union men.

Kinney has suggested that what was in the dissecting room were "remains [of deceased soldiers] that the Confederates had no time to bury". However, the Confederates' evacuation of Winchester was not sudden or rapid. And none of the first Union visitors to the dissecting room mentions adult bodies, or dead soldiers. They would not have led a soldier to say he saw "terrible sights", "the most horrid thing that I ever did see".

According to the same letter from Winchester, the students and faculty had to leave with the withdrawing rebel troops, "for they committed all sorts of depredations on Union people, and the negroes especially".

=== The skinning of one of Brown's sons ===
==== The skin ====
That the body of one of John Brown's sons had been skinned in Winchester and turned into an anatomical exhibit appeared in a newspaper as early as December 6, 1859, only four days after John Brown's execution:

[T]he students at the Winchester Medical College...have skinned the body of one of Brown's sons, separated the nervous and muscular and venous systems, dried and varnished them, and have the whole hung up as a nice anatomical illustration. Some of the students wished to stuff the skin, others to make it into game pouches."

Another report says the skin was tanned. Yet another says that "the skins of John Brown's sons" were tanned and used to make saddle seats for the "chivalry" of Virginia.

According to the best documented version, Winchester Medical students made moccasins of it. A man present in Winchester in 1861 before the arrival of Union troops, whom the newspaper called reliable, reported this, adding that the student or students had given him a scrap of the skin, which he displayed. A student,

after a triumphal parade of the slippers and a bloviating description of the processes by which they were produced, heroically exclaimed, 'That's the way we se've you d—d Yankees when you come 'mongst us an' don't walk afteh ouh style!"

Not only did this student have a scrap of skin to give away, pieces of the skin were in demand and apparently distributed widely in the area; pieces had to be kept "minute" because there was such a demand for them. A doctor in Winchester had another piece in his "private museum". Another piece was sent by a Union general to a doctor in New York, who displayed it to a reporter. According to the General, it had been given "to my present Aid [sic] in Richmond last April [1861] by a Captain Sommers of the Confederate States army, and a friend of the doctor who has the skeleton, and who flayed and tanned the skin." Yet another piece was reported to have been sent to one member of the family, in an envelope.

Skinning a human corpse was an indication of scorn and disrespect. Nat Turner's body was skinned.

==== The remainder of the body, an exhibit ====
The Union officers coming into Winchester in March 1862 had no reason to know about this. However, Union troops, needing space for barracks, offices, and especially hospitals, used "all the buildings that could be commandeered into service: ...hotels, churches, and private homes." They soon found the vacant Medical College, recently used as a military hospital by General Jackson.

Like most medical schools, that in Winchester had a one-room "museum" or collection of anatomical specimens and curiosities. A letter to the New York World from Winchester, dated March 15, reported:

In the Medical College, here, is preserved the body of John Brown's son, killed at Harper's Ferry, first skinned, and only the frame and muscles retained. It stands at full length in one corner of the museum, labelled 'John Brown's son—thus always with Abolitionists'.

Another report, dated three days later, says that "the muscles, veins and arteries [were] all preserved, the top of the cranium sawn off, and the lips purposely distorted in disrespect." This report, however, identifies the body as that of John Brown, contradicting the earlier statement that the specimen was labeled. It was immediately pointed out that the body of John Brown, as was widely reported, had been buried in 1859 at the John Brown Farm in North Elba, New York. Other reports specify that it was the left half of the skull that had been removed, along with the brain.

According to Dr. Jarvis Johnson, it was "one of the most beautiful specimens he ever saw". "The anatomical preparation of the body was perfect." The arteries had been stained with red dye, and the muscles looked as solid as wood.

When found, the exhibit was standing, leaning against the wall, the arms extending upwards from the elbows. Four of the finger joints on one hand and all the toes on one foot had been stolen by souvenir hunters.

An unidentified "doctor in Virginia" had written Governor Wise asking that John Brown's body be "held for dissection in order to further degrade Brown".

==== The intervention of Dr. Jarvis J. Johnson ====
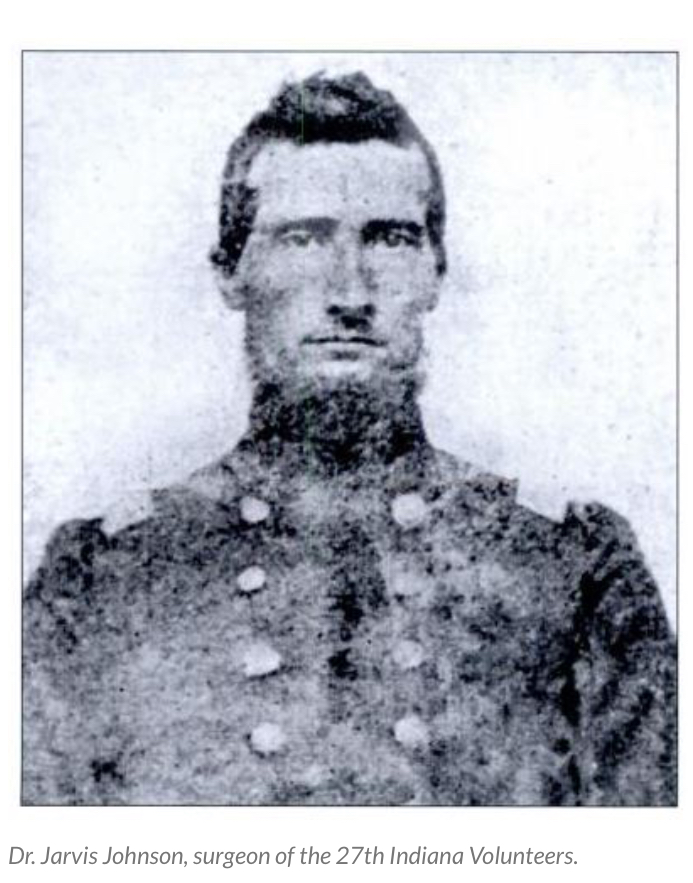
Dr. Jarvis J. Johnson

The most detailed account is in a sworn (notarized) statement from Dr. Jarvis J. Johnson (1825–1899), of Martinsville, Indiana, who was with General Banks when Union troops entered Winchester, and was the first doctor to enter the building.

After we had entered the city, I took possession of the medical college situated therein. In the museum of the said college I found a large symmetrical and anatomical human body or frame. It had been well prepared for preservation and contained all the muscles, arteries and nerves. By permission of General Banks, I took charge of the specimen and removed it to the Academy Hospital in Winchester [the hospital in the Winchester Academy building], which hospital was then under my control.

After its removal to the said hospital a number of prominent citizens of Winchester called upon me at the hospital, and each and all declared that it was the remains of a son of John Brown. That the said son had been killed at Harper's Ferry, Va., in October, 1859, at the time of the insurrection.

One of the professors of the said college [presumably the college president and its professor of anatomy, Dr. Hugh Holmes McGuire] also called upon me in person, and demanded that I return the specimen. He then gave me all the details of the manner in which the body had been prepared, and said that he did it himself. He told me that after young Brown was killed at Harper's Ferry, that he had the body sent to Winchester, and that upon consultation with the other professors of the college, it was decided to prepare the body of young Brown that it might be preserved in the museum of the college as a specimen, and as an object of interest and note.

The professor strongly appealed to me in the name of my profession, and in the interest of the same, and as a friend of science to return to him the said body. He said that when the war was over, the college, which had been burned, would be rebuilt and that it should again be deposited therein. He cited the fact that the sons of John Brown had been killed while engaged with their father in the attempt to overthrow Virginia's cherished institution of slavery, and hence Virginia was entitled to the body as an object of warning and curiosity.

In answer to the demand and appeals of the professor I said that the memory of John Brown and his sons, and their heroic battle at Harper's Ferry for the freedom of the slave, were held in too high esteem for me to leave the body upon the slave soil of Virginia.

It is garbled misinformation that Jarvis himself preserved the body. However, what to do with the preserved body of Brown's son was a problem for Dr. Johnson. It could not be buried in Winchester. No cemetery would have accepted his body, and if had been buried it would have been dug up just as soon as Union troops departed if not before, since the professor very much wanted his specimen back.

Since the body, as Dr. Johnson saw it, had to leave Virginia, "I afterwards, in the summer of 1862, shipped the said body by express via Franklin, Ind., that point being the nearest express office to my own home, then at Morgantown, Morgan County, Ind. The said specimen has been in my possession, and under my control ever since, and I have no doubt whatever, but that it is the son of the heroic John Brown."

Johnson's statement is supported by two notarized affidavits. The first is from Lieutenant Fletcher D. Rundell, a Union soldier who entered Winchester with Johnson. The second is from 11 prominent citizens of Martinsville—3 doctors, 3 lawyers, 3 bankers, a druggist, and a clerk. They stated that it was well known in Martinsville that Johnson brought back from Winchester the body of one of John Brown's sons, although they had no way of confirming the identity of the corpse. An Army nurse also wrote in support.

== Burning the College ==
The Winchester Medical School was burned to the ground by Union soldiers under General Banks on May 16, 1862, just before retreating as Stonewall Jackson's army came down the Shenandoah toward the city. Soldiers prevented fire trucks from extinguishing the blaze.

As put by a former student:

Winchester, Va., Sept. 7, 1894.
James Monroe,
Dear Sir: — The postmaster asked me, as the oldest living graduate of the old Winchester Medical College, to answer your note. The college was burnt by General Banks' army in May, 1862. He himself regretted it, but his New England doctors and chaplains did it—applied the torch with their own hands. They proclaimed that theirs was a campaign of education. ...Only one of the professors now lives—Dr. Hunter McGuire, of Richmond. I am, sir, respectfully yours, D. B. Conrad.

== The identification and burial of Watson's body ==
=== Dr. Johnson reaches out to John Brown's widow ===
Mrs. Brown, John Brown's widow, lived in California. She travelled considerably, attending fundraisers and seeking employment or support; she was near-destitute. A fundraiser was announced for Chicago to raise money for a monument to Brown, and she attended, intending to travel on to visit her two stepsons in Ohio, John Jr. and Owen, and her husband's grave at North Elba, which she had not visited in over 20 years. Her trip to Chicago was funded by friends.

A second fundraiser in Chicago was intended to buy her a homestead in California. It was attended by over 1,000 people, and the amount raised "will probably be quite a handsome sum". These facts appeared in the Chicago Tribune and then were reprinted in the Indianapolis Journal, where they came to the attention of Dr. Jarvis Johnson.

Johnson wrote the Chicago Tribune, asking that it inform Mrs. Brown that he had the body of one of her sons, whose name was either Edward or Edwin. (Another report on Johnson says the names he gave were "Owen, or Edwin".) Unsure of what her reaction might be, rather than give Johnson's letter directly to Mrs. Brown, the paper said editorially, it passed it on to her stepson John Jr., whom she was about to visit at his home in Put-In-Bay, Ohio.

Johnson then wrote to John Jr. saying that he believed he had the body of one of his brothers, and that he wished to return it so that it could be properly buried. Johnson made clear in his letters that he was not selling the body and would not accept any reward or other compensation. This helped Johnson's credibility; at first there was skepticism of his story.

=== John Brown Jr. travels to Martinsville to identify the remains ===
The Brown family knew that two sons had died in Harpers Ferry: Watson and Oliver; Owen also participated but escaped. They knew also that one body had been taken to the Winchester Medical College, but they did not know which. No one else knew either. It was called a mystery that would never be solved.

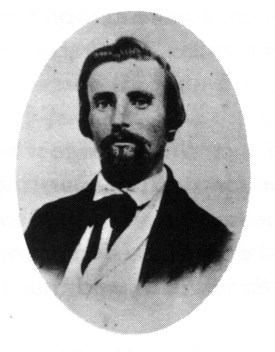
Only known picture of Watson Brown.

John Jr., with photos of both Watson and Oliver, traveled to Martinsville to inspect the remains—he was the guest of the Governor of Indiana for dinner. At John's request, Indiana State Geologist John Collett, whom John Jr. knew from their common interest in phrenology, also traveled to Martinsville to see the body. From the pictures and the bullet hole, they both concluded the body was Watson and not Oliver.

=== Watson Brown's burial ===
Watson's body was taken on the train by John Jr. to Put-in-Bay, and their mother then took it to her former home, today the John Brown Farm State Historic Site, near Lake Placid, New York. He was buried next to his father in October 1882, 23 years after his death.

== See also ==
- Body snatchers
- Scientific racism
- Jackson's Valley Campaign
- John Brown's raiders
- Winchester Law School
- Winchester, Virginia, in the American Civil War
