= Sociopolitical issues of anatomy in America in the 19th century =

As anatomy classes in medical education proliferated in the 19th century, so too did the need for bodies to dissect. Grave robbery proliferated, along with associated social discontent, revulsion, and unhappiness. Conflicts arose between medical practitioners and defenders of bodies, graves and graveyards. This resulted in riots. Social legislation was passed in many countries to address the competing concerns.

== History ==
The sociopolitical issues of anatomy in America in the 19th century largely stemmed from the increased use of anatomy in the medical curriculum, headed by Xavier Bichat, René Laennec, and other European and American physicians. In America, medical education expanded significantly during this period, with the number of medical schools going from four in 1800 to more than 160 in 1900. The conventional medical establishment became concerned with a possible decline in quality of medical students and the competition of orthodox medicine.

In the face of these pressures, the American medical profession turned to identify with anatomy and European science (then seen as the most advanced and prestigious). With increasing anatomical emphasis in hospitals and the medical curriculum following changes in European medicine in the early 19th century, physicians in the US similarly sought to set the medical profession apart from alternative medicine and other rivals through increased anatomical studies. As a result, the demand for corpses by medical students for dissection studies grew, which in turn propelled widespread medical grave-robbing, social strife and legislative changes to provide anatomists with legal supplies of cadavers. Medical grave robbery prompted anatomy riots in nearly every medical institution and drove changes in legislatures. The increase in importance of anatomy in medical studies also increased society's interest in the human body, which prompted the popularization of anatomy museums.

== Grave robbery ==
The societal funerary obligation to respect the dead made it difficult for anatomists to obtain bodies for dissection. It was legal in most US states to dissect executed criminals, but the number of people executed was insufficient for the growing medical body. Thus, the medical schools had to resort to sourcing cadavers from graves. Ostensibly, authorities were willing to turn a blind eye on the desecration of graves, so long as it involved only the graves of those who had been impoverished or poorly connected.

Christians were particularly against dissections as they believed that only complete bodies could be resurrected. In addition, dissections were commonly associated with executed, i.e., hanged criminals, thus many perceived morbid anatomy for anatomical studies as punishment that is only justified to inflict on the morally condemned.

=== Anatomy riots ===
Medical grave robbing incited widespread anger and abhorrence, resulting in at least seventeen full-fledged anatomy riots in the United States between 1785 and 1855, in Connecticut, Vermont, Ohio, and elsewhere. Although a law which outlawed body snatching, and allowed executed criminals to be dissected after death, was passed by the New York legislature after the 1788 riot, medical students continued to face a shortage of cadavers, and so grave robbing persisted

These anatomy riots involved citizens attacking medical buildings and the students and staff within them, reclaiming bodies and retaliating against militiamen sent to contain the riots. These attacks were rampant at most medical schools, including the University of Maryland, Franklin Medical College in Illinois, and even Yale University. Some were forced to shut down, sometimes permanently, and others had to relocate. Union troops burned Winchester Medical College in 1862 specifically for using for dissection the bodies of John Brown's son Watson Brown and three African Americans following John Brown's raid on Harpers Ferry; it never reopened. In the nineteenth century, the availability of bodies for anatomical studies often determined a medical institution's success. Subsequent to these riots, institutions that could afford it turned to importing cadavers at much higher prices, and those who could not faced shutdown.

== Anatomy acts ==
In response to the increasing hospital competition for and public opposition against bodies for pathological anatomy, in 1820s the anatomists in America began demanding legal protection for the acquisition of cadavers. States began passing anatomy acts, or "bone bills," the first of such in Massachusetts in 1831. This legislation allowed medical schools access to "unclaimed" bodies, often those of people who died in workhouses, hospitals or other similar institutions and had no money for proper burial.

While supplying anatomists with a steady supply of bodies, the anatomy acts sought to appease the upper and middle classes, assuring them that their bodies would not be plundered after death. Anatomists also appealed to taxpayers by arguing that expenditures could be saved on burying the indigents in society and the poor could be motivated to work harder and not seek social relief. These acts were a form of retributive justice, contending that the poor, like the criminal, owed a debt to society, which could be repaid through offering their bodies for the advancement of medical science.

This legislation evoked an outcry from the poor and the egalitarian bourgeoisie. They contended the class basis of such laws and argued that anatomists were no more morally superior than resurrectionists who robbed graves. Contentions over anatomy acts continued in states across America from the mid to late nineteenth century. Three of the five acts passed before 1860 were repealed, among which New York's act was only enacted in 1854, thirty years after its proposal?

=== Subsequent influences ===
The anatomy acts did relieve medical institutions' shortage of bodies and significantly reduced grave robbing. Yet, it entailed other social contentions. Waiting periods were sometimes breached, and the next of kin were rarely notified before bodies were procured. As the medical profession continued to expand and some states were yet to pass anatomy acts, illegal trading of bodies still endured. By the end of the nineteenth century, most states had enacted anatomy acts, except those in the South that obtained bodies through predominantly black prison populations.

The anatomy acts resulted in a moral condemnation of the poor and a general fear of falling into the abyss of the "unclaimed," driving large changes in the funeral economy. Humanitarian movements in the mid to late nineteenth century against the legislation propelled a rapid increase in philanthropic organizations offering burials for the poor. Religious beliefs of the importance of proper burials bound people more closely to the religious institutions and charitable organizations, which often offered spaces in their cemeteries for poor. The working class set up burial societies to protect against economic downturns and poverty, and cheap insurance for the poor increased in popularity (see history of Prudential Financial)

== Anatomy museums ==
The expansion of medical schools and the emphasis on anatomical dissection in the nineteenth century increased public interest in anatomy. Anatomy museums were the norm for medical schools, sometimes even an attraction for potential medical students. The learned medical professional or the bourgeoisie were often the collector or curator, while criminals and the poor were bodies being displayed <.

Initially set up to teach people the natural and moral sciences of the human body, anatomy museums gradually declined in status with the progress of medical science and education. In postbellum America, the division between high and low medicine increased. The focus of public scientific education turned toward the structures and functions of plants, animals, and cells, and this was done through politically and socially approved public school curriculums and United States Sanitary Commission Sanitary Fairs. These other avenues not only appeared more legitimate, but also reduced the uniqueness of anatomy museums. Anatomy museums' popularity also suffered with the establishment of nonprofit art and natural history museums catering to the upper and middle classes, causing anatomy museums to resort into displays of sexual anatomy and bodies with venereal diseases to appeal to the middle and lower classes. In the nineteenth century, nudity was only permitted when embellished with moral claims. Anatomy museums thus began to seek the audience of those who desired to attain bourgeois status, appealing to this population's aspirations for a culturally refined status and their interests in the sensational.
