= Hunter McGuire =

American physician, teacher, and orator

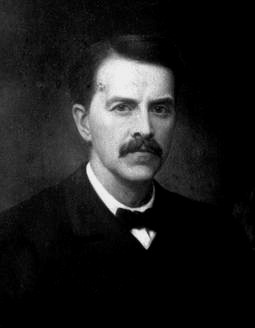
- Hunter Holmes McGuire
- Born: October 11, 1835; Winchester, Virginia
- Died: September 19, 1900 (aged 64)
- Education: Winchester Medical College
- Occupations: Physician, teacher, orator
- Known for: Started several schools and hospitals which later became Virginia Commonwealth University
- Relatives: Hugh Holmes McGuire (father)
- Medical career
- Field: Surgery
- Institutions: Confederate Army

Hunter Holmes McGuire (October 11, 1835 – September 19, 1900) was an American soldier, physician, teacher, and orator. McGuire was a surgeon in the Confederate Army attached to Stonewall Jackson's command, and he continued serving with the Army of Northern Virginia after Jackson's death. He started several schools and hospitals which later became part of Virginia Commonwealth University in Richmond, Virginia. McGuire was later president of the American Medical Association. The McGuire Veterans Administration Medical Center was named in his honor until 2023 when the Veterans Administration changed the name to Richmond VA Medical Center.

== Biography ==
=== Youth and education ===
Hunter Holmes McGuire was both born and died in the family house at Braddock and Amherst Streets in Winchester, Virginia, built by his grandfather. He was born on October 11, 1835. His father, Hugh Holmes McGuire, was a prominent surgeon, and a pioneer in eye surgery. Hunter was one of seven children. He often accompanied his father, and studied medicine at the Winchester Medical College founded and run by his father, from which he graduated in 1855. His continuing medical education in Philadelphia at Jefferson Medical College was interrupted by the onset of the hostilities which led to the American Civil War. He taught briefly at Tulane University in New Orleans before joining the Confederate Army in 1861.

=== Civil War ===
McGuire joined "The Winchester Rifles", Company F of the 2nd Virginia Infantry as a private in the Confederate Army. However, his services were much more valuable as a doctor rather than a front line soldier. McGuire was made a brigade surgeon and was ordered to report to General Thomas J. Jackson at Harpers Ferry. Jackson initially scoffed at McGuire's youth, but the two became very close as the war progressed. McGuire treated General Jackson after the First Battle of Manassas, where the General picked up the nickname "Stonewall Jackson" following an exclamation by General Barnard E. Bee Jr. (who himself was killed during the battle).

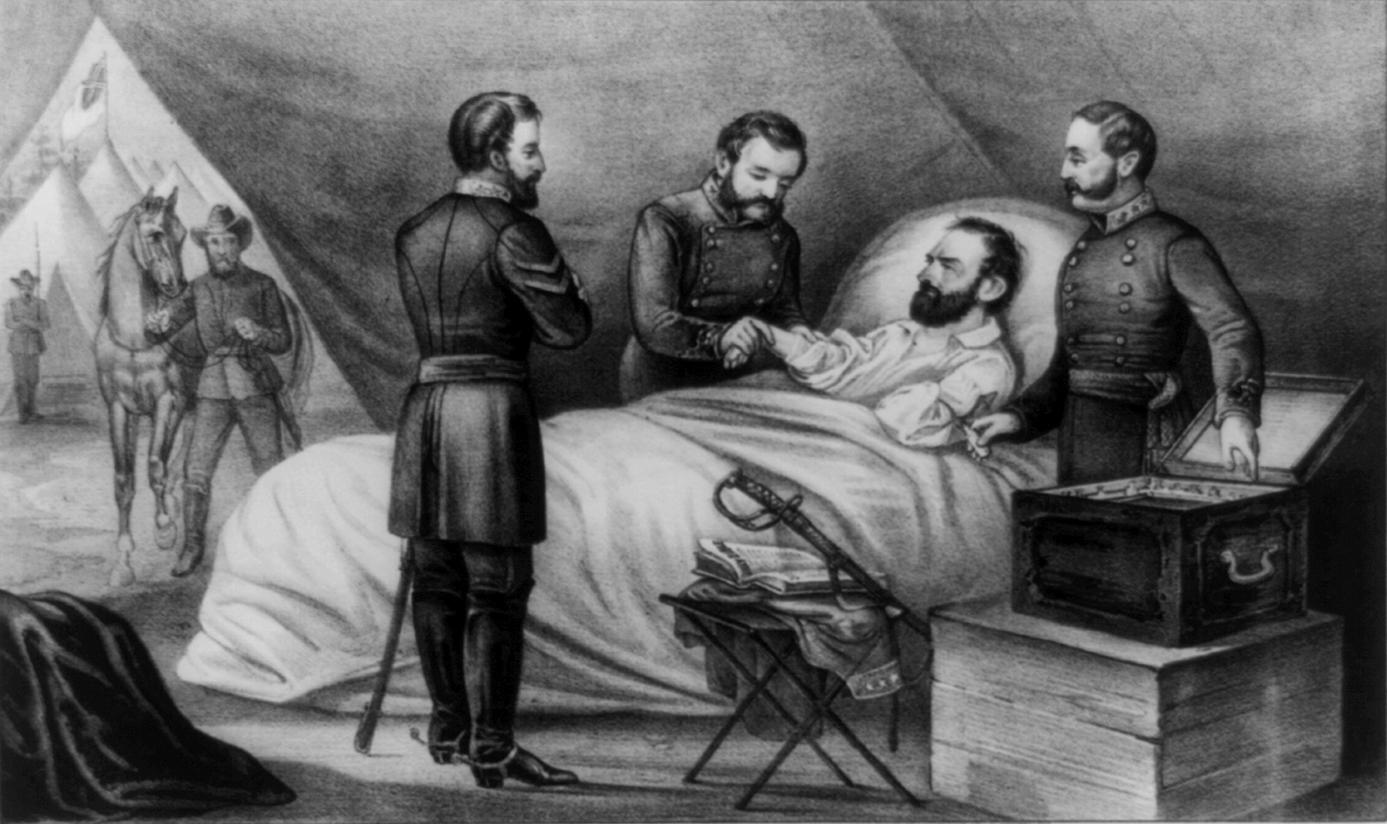
Stonewall Jackson's deathbed

In 1862, McGuire was promoted to the chief surgeon of Jackson's Corps, serving in the Army of Northern Virginia under its Medical Director, Lafayette Guild. While attached to Jackson's corps during the Second Bull Run Campaign, McGuire amputated Jackson's subordinate Richard Ewell's leg after Ewell was wounded at the Battle of Groveton. In May 1863, Jackson was gravely wounded by friendly fire while performing a reconnaissance during the Battle of Chancellorsville. The severity of the wounds required McGuire to amputate Jackson's left arm. Jackson died of pneumonia a few days later. His last words were recorded by McGuire as: "Let us cross over the river and rest beneath the shade of the trees". The death of Jackson affected McGuire greatly. He would always remember Jackson with the deepest reverence and served as a pallbearer in Stonewall's funeral. During the Second Battle of Winchester, which was part of Robert E. Lee's invasion of Pennsylvania, McGuire served under Richard Ewell (who by this time had returned to field command). At the Battle of Gettysburg, McGuire amputated the leg of General Isaac R. Trimble after Pickett's Charge. He later served under General Jubal Early.

McGuire was captured at the Battle of Waynesboro in March 1865, but was released and rejoined the Army of Northern Virginia. He was present at the surrender at Appomattox Court House.

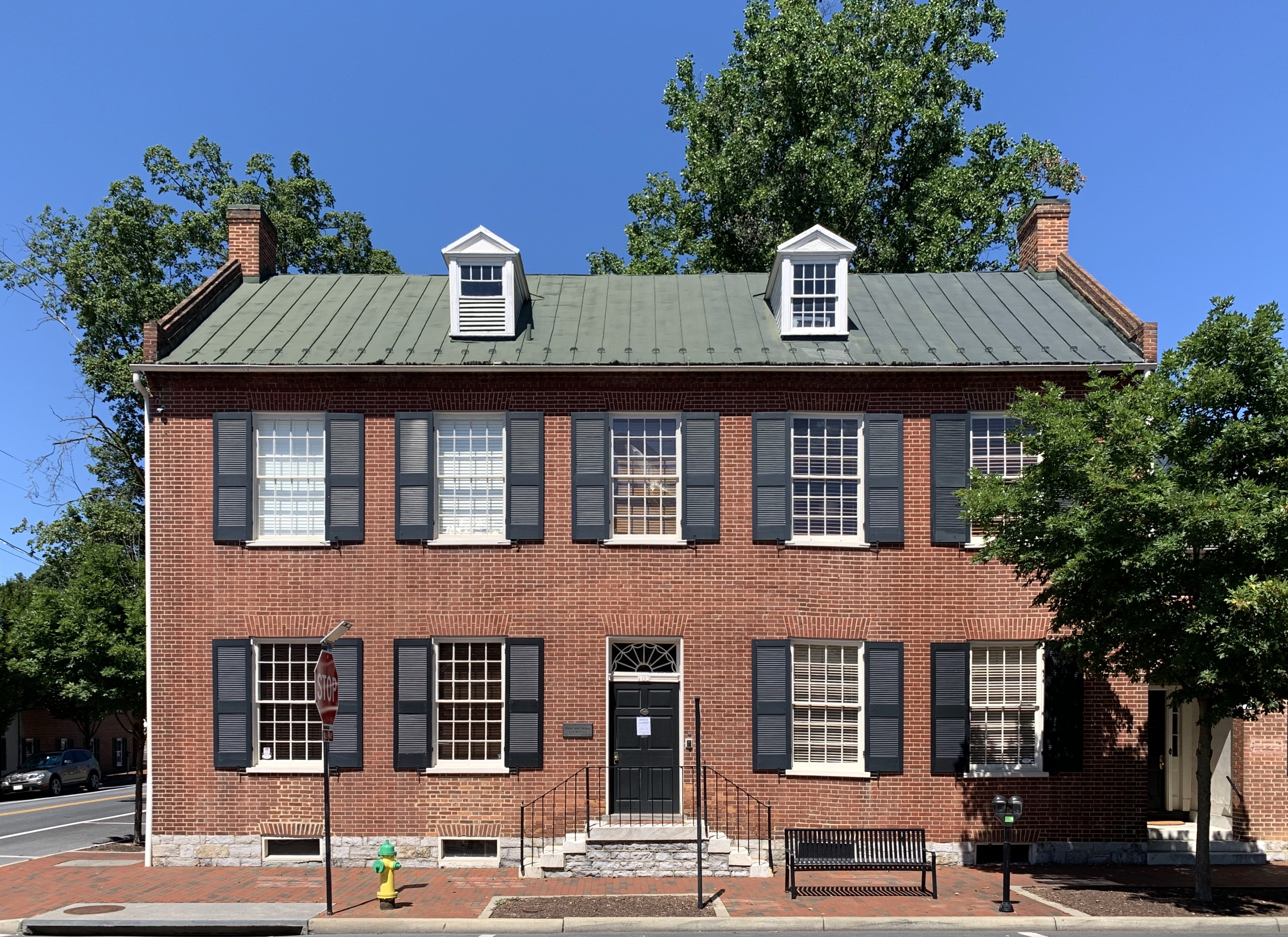
McGuire's home in Winchester, Virginia

In May 1862, Jackson's army captured Winchester, Virginia. Among their captured prisoners were seven U.S. army physicians (then called "surgeons"). McGuire wished to see medical personnel treated as non-combatants, so he convinced Jackson to set a precedent by releasing the captured surgeons. With Jackson's approval, McGuire drafted an agreement (known afterwards as the "Winchester Accord", which the Federal surgeons signed, saying: "We surgeons and assistant surgeons, United States Army, now prisoners of war, do give our parole of honor on being unconditionally released to report in person, singly or collectively to the Secretary of War in Washington City as such and that we will use our best efforts that the same number of medical officers of the Confederate States Army now prisoners or may hereafter be taken be released on the same terms. And furthermore we will on our honor use our best efforts to have this principle established – the unconditional release of all medical officers taken prisoners of war hereafter." The released surgeons honored their agreement to take the message to Washington and almost immediately it had the desired effect. On June 6, 1862, the United States immediately and unconditionally released all Confederate surgeons being held as prisoners of war. Thereafter, for the remainder of the war, all captured medical personnel were immediately released so as not to impede their live-saving work, saving an untold number of lives. As the National Museum of Civil War Medicine puts it on its website: "Thanks to Dr. Hunter McGuire's idea…the safety of medical personnel drastically improved. With the safety and quick release of doctors, assistants, and nurses ensured, care of the wounded progressed. It could be argued (that) Dr. McGuire revolutionized American battlefield medicine by humanizing the battlefield and giving injured men a better chance to receive the care they needed to survive."

=== Post-Civil War ===
McGuire served as president of the American Medical Association. McGuire married Mary Stuart of Staunton. Her father, Alexander Hugh Holmes Stuart, was a U.S. Congressman and Secretary of the Interior before the Civil War. Mary was a cousin of General Jeb Stuart. She and Hunter had nine children. He lived at 5th and Grace St. in downtown Richmond, had a summer residence in Bon Air, Virginia, and a house in Henrico County. A statue of McGuire sat behind the Virginia State Capitol.

McGuire wrote the introduction of the 1901 book The Old Plantation: How We Lived in Great House and Cabin before the War, written by James Battle Avirett. In the introduction cited above he lamented the freeing and enfranchisement of former slaves, and lauded the supremacy of the Caucasian race.

In August 2026, McGuire's statue was removed from the grounds of the Virginia State Capitol and moved to the visitor's center at the Third Battle of Winchester battlefield.

== Writings ==
- McGuire, Hunter; Christian, George L. (1907). The Confederate Cause and Conduct in the War Between the States; As set forth in the Reports of the History Committee of the Grand Camp, C.V., of Virginia, and other Confederate Papers. Richmond, Virginia: L.H. Jenkins.
- McGuire, Hunter (1901). Introduction to James Battle Avirett, The Old Plantation. pp. v–x.

== Further reading (most recent first) ==
- Breeden, James O. (1995). "Rehearsal for Secession? The Return Home of Southern Medical Students in 1859". In Finkelman, Paul (ed.). His Soul Goes Marching On. Responses to John Brown and the Harpers Ferry Raid. Charlottesville, Virginia: University Press of Virginia. pp. 174–210. ISBN 0813915368.
- Shaw, Maurice F. (1993). Stonewall Jackson's surgeon Hunter Holmes McGuire: a biography. Lynchburg, Virginia: H. E. Howard. ISBN 9781561900473.
- Schildt, John W. (1986). Hunter Holmes McGuire: Doctor In Gray. Chewsville, Maryland: Antietam Publications. ISBN 9780936772059.
