= Kristin Luker =

American sociologist

Kristin Luker (born c. 1946) is Elizabeth Josselyn Boalt Professor of Law in the Jurisprudence and Social Policy Program and Professor of Sociology at the University of California, Berkeley. Earlier she was the Doris Stevens Chair of Women's Studies at Princeton University and professor at the University of California, San Diego.

Luker has been elected to the American Academy of Arts and Sciences, the Sociological Research Association, and was invited to the White House by President Bill Clinton to discuss issues of politics and social policy. She has been awarded grants from the Spencer and Ford Foundations, as well as the Commonwealth Fund, and has won fellowships from the Guggenheim Foundation, the National Endowment for the Humanities and the National Institute of Mental Health. Her interests include sexual and reproductive behavior, gender, and the relationship between gender and the history of the social sciences in the United States and elsewhere.

Luker is the author of five books: Taking Chances: Abortion and the Decision Not to Contracept (1975), Abortion and the Politics of Motherhood (1984), Dubious Conceptions: The Politics of Teenage Pregnancy (1996), When Sex Goes to School (2006) and Salsa Dancing Into the Social Sciences (2008) and many articles in scholarly journals.

Her book Abortion and the Politics of Motherhood received the Charles Horton Cooley Award from the Society for the Study of Symbolic Interactionism. The book contrasts the worldviews of abortion-rights and anti-abortion activists, arguing that the two sides of the debate on abortion are rooted in different sets of values and ideas about women's roles. Her thesis was criticized in the 2010s by political scientist Jon Shields in a retrospective in Contemporary Sociology as well as by the New York Times journalist Ross Douthat. The book also explores the historical connection between the rise of both anti-abortion and abortion-rights sentiments, and the desire on the part of physicians to professionalize their image. She is careful in the book not to reveal her personal position on abortion, but her 1992 article "She's Come To You For An Abortion" in Harper's Magazine reveals that she supports abortion.

In her book Dubious Conceptions, Luker discusses the evolution of public perceptions about teenage pregnancy during the twentieth century, and argues that teenage pregnancy should be recognized not as a distinct social problem, but as a symptom of the need for better approaches to poverty. The book was named a New York Times "Notable Book of the Year."

== Selected publications ==
- Taking Chances: Abortion and the Decision Not to Contracept (University of California Press, 1975) (ISBN 0-520-02872-4)
- Abortion and the Politics of Motherhood (University of California Press, 1984) (ISBN 0-520-05597-7)
- Dubious Conceptions: The Politics of the Teenage Pregnancy Crisis (Harvard University Press, 1996) (ISBN 0-674-21703-9)
- When Sex Goes to School: Warring Views on Sex--and Sex Education--Since the Sixties" (W.W. Norton, 2006) (ISBN 0393329968)
- Salsa Dancing Into the Social Sciences: Research in an Age of Info Glut (Harvard University Press, 2010) (ISBN 0674048210)
- A reminder that human behaviour frequently refuses to conform to models created by researchers. Family Planning Perspectives, 1999, 31(5), 248–249.
- Is academic sociology politically obsolete? Contemporary Sociology, 1999, 28(1), 5–10.
- Sex, social hygiene and the double-edged sword of social reform. Theory and Sociology, 1998, 27, 601–634.
- Does liberalism cause sex (with J. Mauldon). American Prospect, 1996 (winter).
- The effects of sex education on contraceptive behavior (with J. Mauldon). Family Planning Perspectives. 1996 (March)
- Young Single Mothers and 'Welfare Reform' in the United States. In A. Daguerre and C. Nativel (eds) When Children become Parents: Welfare State Responses to Teenage Pregnancy (with C. Carter. Polity Press, 2006)
