= Charles Broadway Rouss =

American businessman and philanthropist (1836–1902)

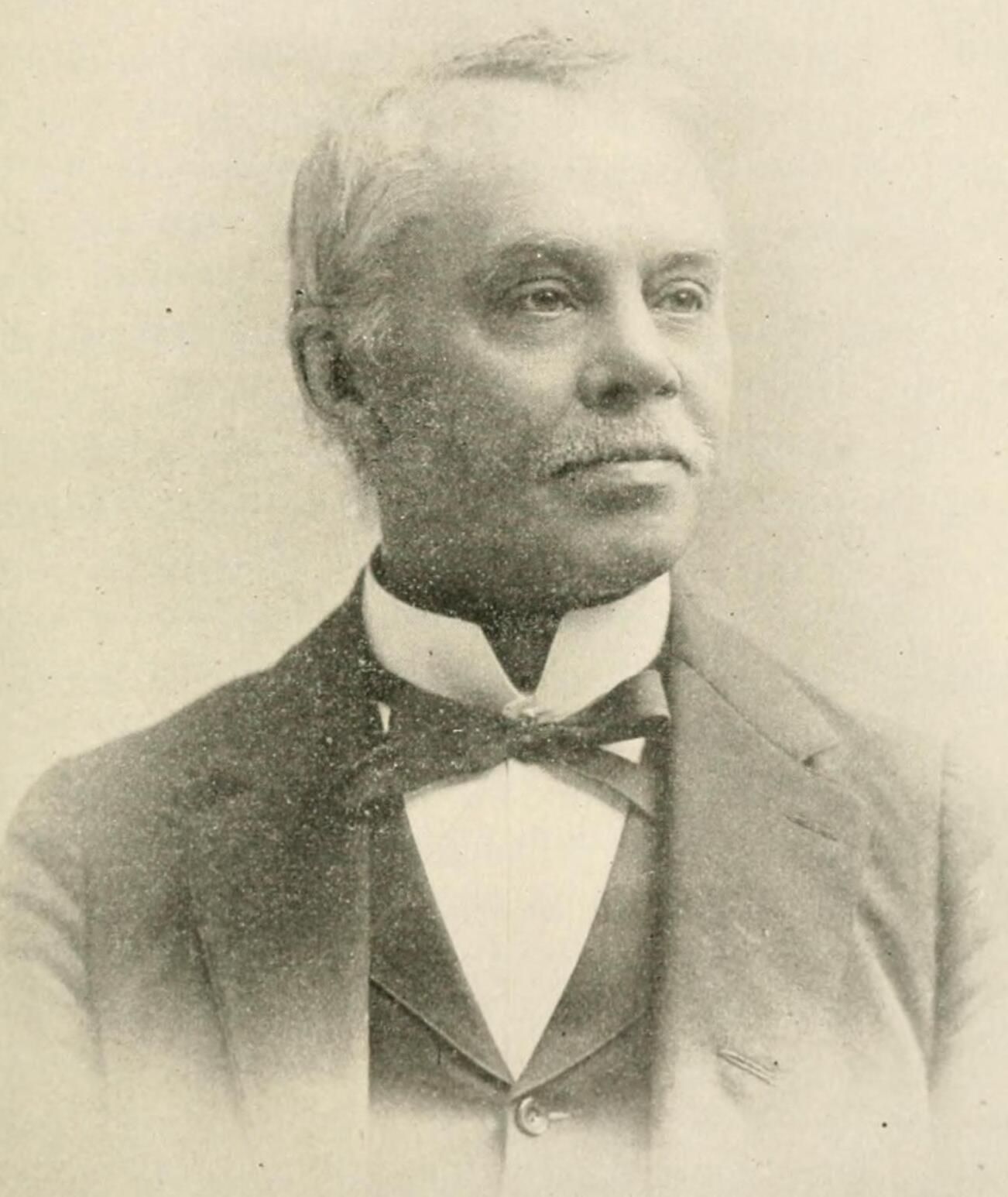
- Portrait of Rouss in a 1900 publication
- Born: Charles Baltzell Rouss; February 11, 1836; Woodsboro, Maryland, U.S.
- Died: March 3, 1902 (aged 66); Manhattan, New York, U.S.
- Resting place: Mount Hebron Cemetery
- Occupation: Businessman
- Spouse: Margaret Keenan (died 1899)
- Children: 3
- Military career
- Allegiance: Confederate States
- Branch: Confederate States Army
- Rank: Private
- Unit: 12th Virginia Cavalry
- Conflicts: American Civil War

Signature
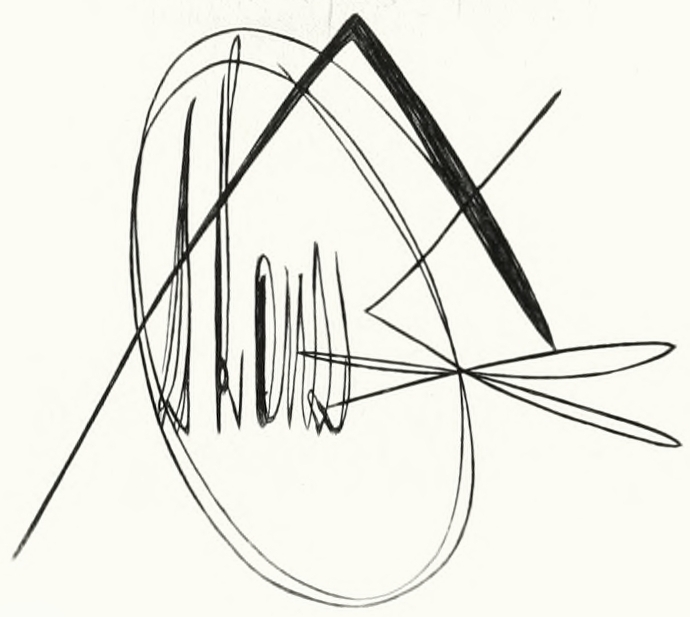

Charles Broadway Rouss (born Charles Baltzell Rouss; February 11, 1836 – March 3, 1902) was an American businessman and philanthropist. Starting as a dry goods businessman in Winchester and Richmond, Virginia, he moved to Manhattan and established a dry goods business there. A former private in the Confederate States Army, he gifted his wealth to the city of Winchester and memorials to the Confederate cause in New York and Virginia.

== Early life ==
Charles Baltzell Rouss was born on February 11, 1836, in Woodsboro, Maryland, to Belinda (née Baltzell) and Peter Hoke Rouss. He later adopted the middle name Broadway after Broadway in Manhattan. In 1841, his father purchased "Runnymede" in Berkeley County, Virginia. The family later moved to Winchester. In 1846, he entered the Winchester Academy. From the ages of 14 to 18, he worked as a clerk at a general store owned by Jacob Senseny in Winchester.

== Career ==
In 1854, Rouss began to start his own mercantile business, a pins-and-needles store. He purchased an advertisement after speaking to Arunah Shepherdson Abell of The Baltimore Sun. The advertisement, "we shall keep everything calculated to make a man fashionable, a woman irrestible, and a family comfortable" appeared in Winchester papers and as handbills throughout the Shenandoah Valley. According to his obituary in The News & Advance, his motto was "quick sales and small profit". At the outbreak of the American Civil War, he was worth US$60,000.

In 1862, Rouss moved his dry goods business to Richmond. He established one store on Main Street and another on East Broad Street. After a short time, he enlisted as a private in company B of the 12th Virginia Cavalry Regiment. He served alongside his friend William Lyne Wilson. Following the war, he returned to his home in the Shenandoah Valley and worked on his father's farm until the end of 1865. Possessing about 250,000 in Confederate bonds and US$11,000 in debt to Northern suppliers from the war, he moved to New York City with his family with less than US$30 in his pocket. He sought loans in Baltimore, Philadelphia, and New York City, including from Alexander Turney Stewart, but was rejected.

By 1873, Rouss had paid off his debt from the war and was shipping goods to stores in 40 different cities across the United States. He went bankrupt during the Panic of 1873. He spent several weeks Ludlow Street Jail due to his debts. Following loans from friends, his debt remained at US$51,000. He then worked in a small room on Church Street.

In late 1877, Rouss opened a store on Broadway and took on the middle name of Broadway. By 1888, he had paid off his standings debts. Between 1889 and 1890, he built a 10–story cast-iron and stone store at 549–553 Broadway for US$500,000 and it stood as the second tallest building in New York City of the time. He owned a chain of retail outlets throughout the United States. By 1895, he had stores in Paris, Berlin, Nottingham, Vienna, Yokohama, and Chemnitz. His business rose to US$10,000,000–US$15,000,000 in annual sales.

== Philanthropy ==
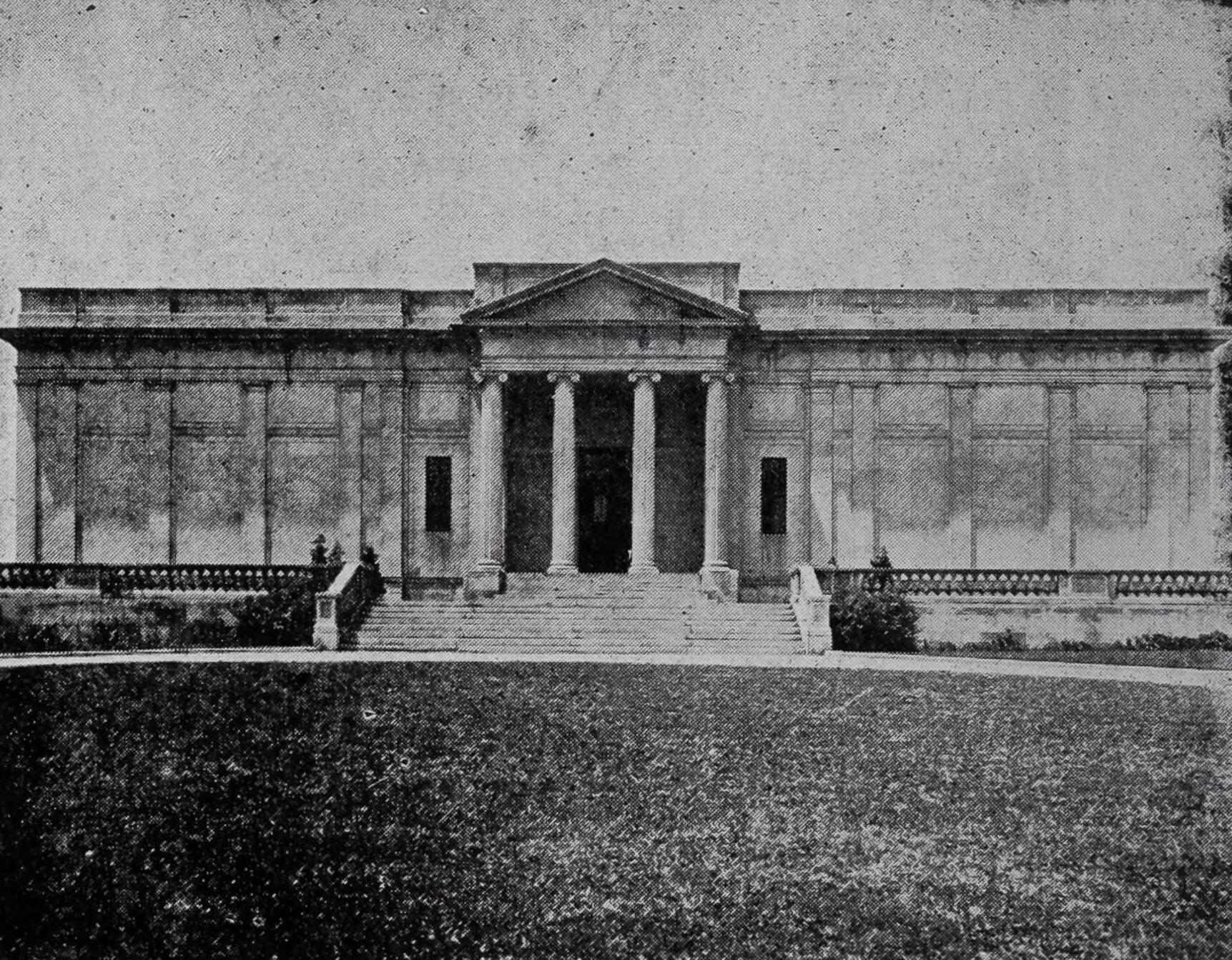
Confederate Memorial Institute ("Battle Abbey")

Rouss gifted over US$100,000 to the city of Winchester. He donated US$30,000 to establish a city hall in Winchester that was later renamed Rouss City Hall. He gifted US$17,500 for a fence around Mount Hebron and Stonewall Confederate cemeteries and a mortuary chapel. He also gifted three fire engines and US$25,000 for the Winchester's first fire department. It was later renamed the Rouss Fire Company. He gifted US$5,000 for Winchester Memorial Hospital (later Winchester Medical Center) and US$30,000 for the city to buy Thatcher Spring. It became the city's first water distribution facility and remained in operation until 1956.

Rouss gifted US$35,000 to the University of Virginia for a physical laboratory. He gifted US$100,000 for Battle Abbey, a Confederate Memorial abbey in Richmond. He described the building as "the Temple of the Lost Cause". He donated US$5,000 for the construction of a monument to the Confederate dead at Mount Hope Cemetery in New York.

Rouss donated US$25,000 to victims of the Johnstown Flood. He gifted a US$25,000 Frédéric Auguste Bartholdi group statue of George Washington and Marquis de Lafayette at Morningside Park in Manhattan. He donated the statues to the city in memorial to his son. He also established an art scholarship for American students in Paris.

== Personal life ==
Rouss married Margaret Keenan, daughter of Andrew Keenan. They had a son who died young in 1891. They also had another son and daughter, Peter Winchester and Virginia. His wife died in 1899. Rouss lived in a mansion on 5th Avenue, Manhattan. He hosted dinners on Sundays to parties of 50 people. After moving to Manhattan, he spent summers in the South at his 23–room Shannon Park home built near his father's Shannon Hill home in the Shenandoah.

Rouss owned a statue Surprise. He was a collector of paintings and portraits, including paintings of Robert E. Lee by Edward Caledon Bruce, and paintings of Stonewall Jackson and Thomas Jefferson. He was friends with Robert G. Ingersoll and Virginia governor Frederick W. M. Holliday. He was agnostic and was quoted saying, "I'd rather be sumbody in Hel than nobody in Heven".

Rouss began losing his sight in 1892 and was completely blind in three years. He offered US$1,000,000 to anyone who could restore his sight. He hired another blind man, James J. Martin or John F. Martin, sources differ, to try treatments to restore his blindness, but in October 1900, Rouss withdrew the offer. He died of heart disease and dropsy on March 3, 1902, at his home in Manhattan. He was interred in the Rouss mausoleum in Mount Hebron Cemetery.

== Legacy ==
In April 1901, the people of the South gave the City of New York a bronze bust of Rouss. It was placed in the Arsenal in Central Park. A United Confederate Veterans camp was named after him.

In 1991, the city of Winchester named February 11 as Charles Broadway Rouss Day to honor his philanthropy to the city. Today, a portrait of Rouss hangs in Rouss City Hall in Winchester.
