= Wood Farm (disambiguation) =

Wood Farm may be:

- Wood Farm, a cottage on the Sandringham Estate in Norfolk, England
- Wood Farm, Oxfordshire, a district of Oxford, England

== See also ==
- Tree plantation
- Woods Mill Farm, Maryland, USA
