= Mount Hebron Cemetery and Gatehouse =

Historic cemetery in Virginia, United States

- U.S. National Register of Historic Places
- Virginia Landmarks Register
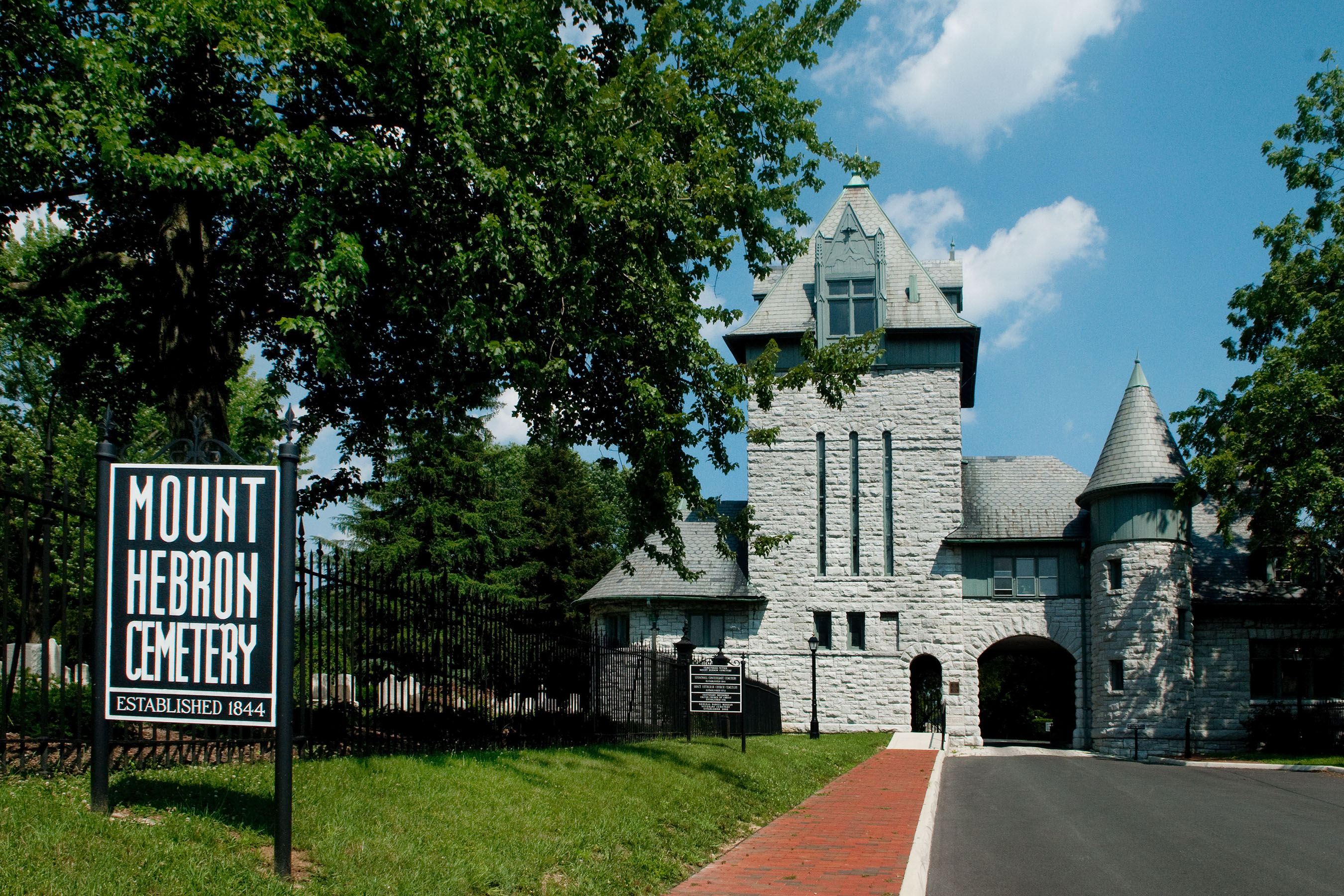
- Mount Hebron Cemetery and Gatehouse, June 2010

- Location within Virginia Location within the United States
- Location: 305 E. Boscawen St., Winchester, Virginia
- Coordinates: 39.182799°N 78.160637°W
- Area: 56.1 acres (22.7 ha)
- Built: 1764, 1844, 1891, 1902
- Architect: Barney, James Stewart; et al.
- Architectural style: Chateauesque
- NRHP reference No.: 09000163
- VLR No.: 138-0044

Significant dates
- Added to NRHP: March 20, 2009
- Designated VLR: December 18, 2008

Mount Hebron Cemetery and Gatehouse is a historic cemetery and gatehouse located at Winchester, Virginia. The cemetery was established in 1844 on two older churchyards, including that of Christ Episcopal Church in 1853. Many Civil War soldiers who died in Winchester's hospitals were interred in this cemetery, but after the war, the Union Burial Corps reinterred many Union dead into the Winchester National Cemetery established nearby, or to their home towns. The 1866 expansion included Stonewall Confederate Cemetery for 2,576 Confederate war dead. Iron fence added in 1891 and the Chateauesque style limestone gatehouse for superintendent added in 1902.

Mount Hebron was added to the National Register of Historic Places in 2009.

== Notable burials ==
- Harry Byrd (1887–1966), American politician from Virginia
- Daniel Morgan (1736–1802), Revolutionary War hero
- Daniel Roberdeau (1727–1795), Founding Father
- Charles Broadway Rouss (1836–1902), businessman and philanthropist
