= Woodsboro, Maryland =

- Town
- Town of Woodsboro
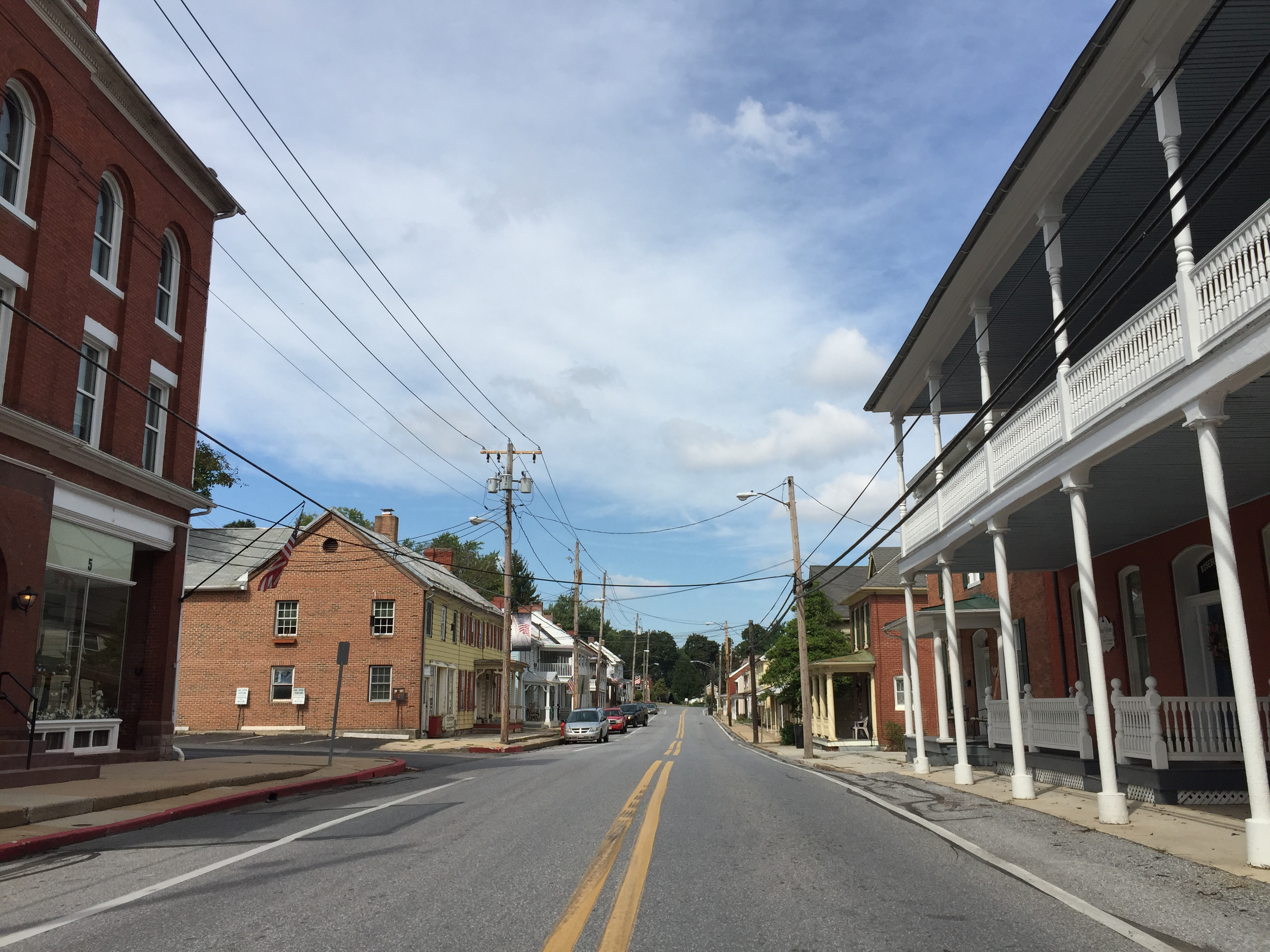
- Main Street in Woodsboro

- Coat of arms Logo
- Motto: "Small Town Life at its Best!"
- Location of Woodsboro, Maryland
- Coordinates: 39°31′58″N 77°18′34″W
- Country: United States of America
- State: Maryland
- County: Frederick
- Founded: 1786
- Incorporated: 1836

Government
  - Burgess: Heath Barnes

Area
  - Total: 0.71 sq mi (1.84 km^{2})
  - Land: 0.71 sq mi (1.83 km^{2})
  - Water: 0.0039 sq mi (0.01 km^{2})
- Elevation: 345 ft (105 m)

Population (2020)
  - Total: 1,092
  - Density: 1,543.6/sq mi (595.97/km^{2})
- Time zone: UTC-5 (Eastern (EST))
  - Summer (DST): UTC-4 (EDT)
- ZIP code: 21798
- Area codes: 301, 240
- FIPS code: 24-86750
- GNIS feature ID: 2391492
- Website: Woodsboro On-Line

Woodsboro is a town in Frederick County, Maryland, United States that was granted to Joseph Wood in 1693. The population was 1,092 at the 2020 census.

== History ==
The town was named after Joseph Wood. The LeGore Bridge was listed on the National Register of Historic Places in 1978 and Woods Mill Farm was listed in 2007.

In 1895, Dr. George F. Smith founded Rosebud Perfume Company in Woodsboro. Smith had eight children, and served as mayor of the town for 19 years. The business has remained in the family, and as of 2012, was still producing its famous "Smith's Rosebud Salve," a lip gloss and salve. The products are shipped from company headquarters in Woodsboro; however, "the salve is manufactured and filled at Case Mason in Joppa, Md., and the tins are made in Baltimore."

The Woodsboro Savings Bank, and several buildings associated with the three limestone quarries near the town are among the structures which have been considered for historic preservation.

== Government ==
Unlike most cities, the executive officer of Woodsboro, Maryland is called a burgess. As of 2025, the Burgess of Woodsboro was Heath Barnes. The legislative body for Woodsboro is a town council consisting of four commissioners.

Woodsboro manages its own water and sewage systems.

In January 2025, work commenced on the construction of a new town hall to serve the Town of Woodsboro. A grand opening ceremony was held on Thursday, October 9, 2025.

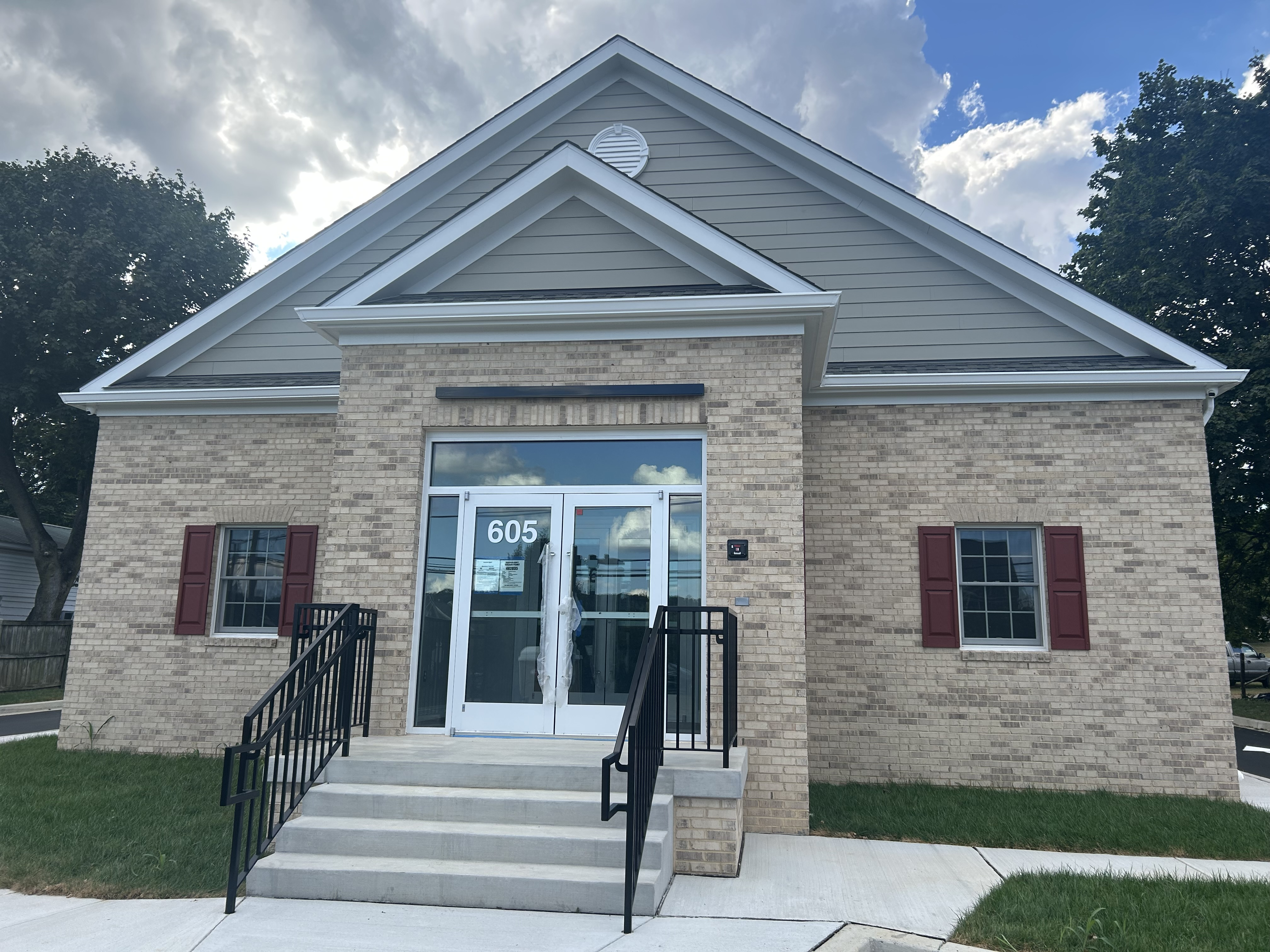
The new Woodsboro Town Hall under construction, September 2025

== Geography ==
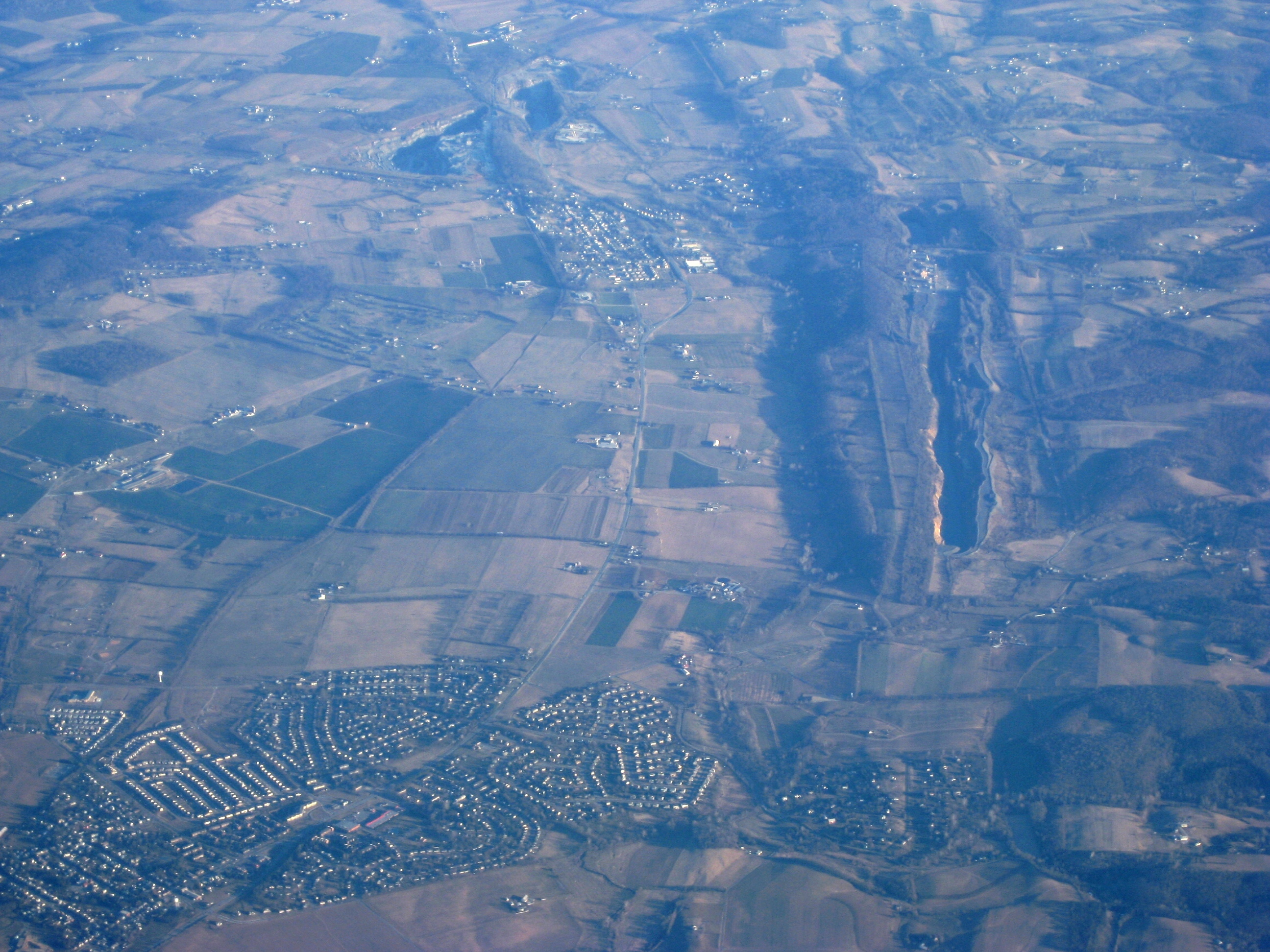
Aerial photo of Woodsboro (center top)

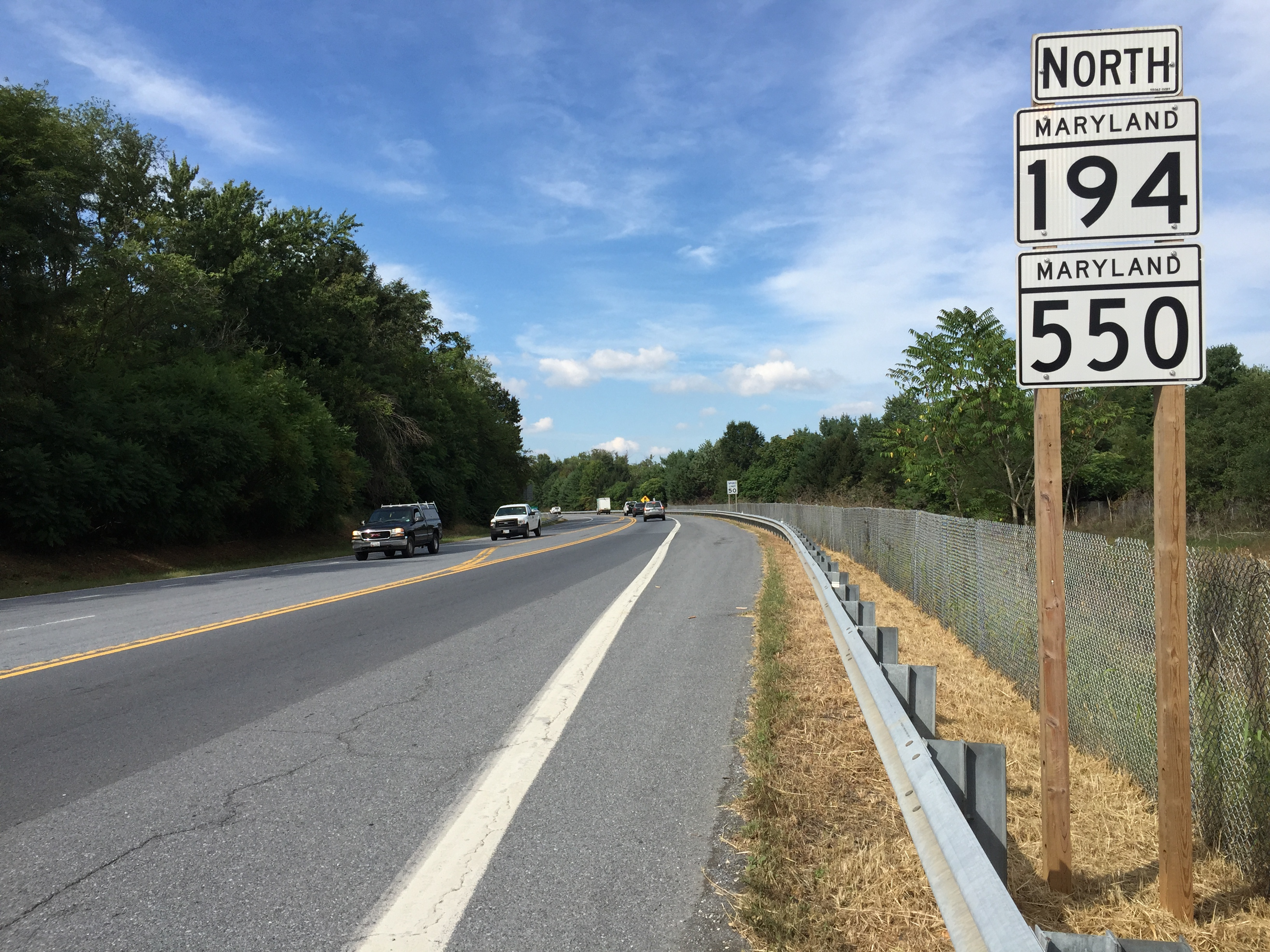
MD 194 and MD 550 northbound in Woodsboro

According to the United States Census Bureau, the town has a total area of 0.71 square miles (1.84 km^{2}), all land.

== Transportation ==
The main means of transport to and from Woodsboro is by road, and two primary state highways serve the town. Maryland Route 194 traverses the area northeast to southwest, connecting the Frederick area to Taneytown. Maryland Route 550 follows a northwest-to-southeast alignment, providing connections to Thurmont and Libertytown. Both roads follow the same alignment for a short distance on the northeast side of Woodsboro.

== Demographics ==
Historical population
Census	Pop.	Note	%±
1880	336		—
1910	362		—
1920	385		6.4%
1930	385		0.0%
1940	416		8.1%
1950	427		2.6%
1960	430		0.7%
1970	439		2.1%
1980	506		15.3%
1990	513		1.4%
2000	846		64.9%
2010	1,141		34.9%
2020	1,092		−4.3%
U.S. Decennial Census

=== 2010 census ===
As of the census of 2010, there were 1,141 people, 423 households, and 306 families living in the town. The population density was 1,607.0 inhabitants per square mile (620.5/km^{2}). There were 443 housing units at an average density of 623.9 per square mile (240.9/km^{2}). The racial makeup of the town was 91.9% White, 3.7% African American, 0.1% Native American, 1.3% Asian, 1.1% from other races, and 1.9% from two or more races. Hispanic or Latino of any race were 4.0% of the population.

There were 423 households, of which 38.1% had children under the age of 18 living with them, 60.5% were married couples living together, 7.8% had a female householder with no husband present, 4.0% had a male householder with no wife present, and 27.7% were non-families. 25.1% of all households were made up of individuals, and 12.5% had someone living alone who was 65 years of age or older. The average household size was 2.70 and the average family size was 3.23.

The median age in the town was 41.1 years. 27% of residents were under the age of 18; 8.3% were between the ages of 18 and 24; 19.9% were from 25 to 44; 32.7% were from 45 to 64; and 12.1% were 65 years of age or older. The gender makeup of the town was 46.6% male and 53.4% female.

=== 2000 census ===
As of the census of 2000, there were 846 people, 273 households, and 229 families living in the town. The population density was 1,230.9 inhabitants per square mile (475.3/km^{2}). There were 295 housing units at an average density of 429.2 per square mile (165.7/km^{2}). The racial makeup of the town was 98.46% White, 0.24% African American, 0.59% Asian, 0.24% from other races, and 0.47% from two or more races. Hispanic or Latino of any race were 0.95% of the population.

There were 273 households, out of which 50.2% had children under the age of 18 living with them, 74.0% were married couples living together, 6.2% had a female householder with no husband present, and 16.1% were non-families. 13.6% of all households were made up of individuals, and 9.5% had someone living alone who was 65 years of age or older. The average household size was 3.10 and the average family size was 3.37.

In the town, the population was spread out, with 35.3% under the age of 18, 4.7% from 18 to 24, 33.3% from 25 to 44, 17.7% from 45 to 64, and 8.9% who were 65 years of age or older. The median age was 36 years. For every 100 females, there were 94.5 males. For every 100 females age 18 and over, there were 89.9 males.

The median income for a household in the town was $65,000, and the median income for a family was $62,500. Males had a median income of $45,250 versus $26,528 for females. The per capita income for the town was $21,434. About 0.9% of families and 2.0% of the population were below the poverty line, including 1.8% of those under age 18 and 5.7% of those age 65 or over.

== Education ==
It is in Frederick County Public Schools.

School zoning is as follows: Residents are zoned to New Midway/Woodsboro Elementary School, Walkersville Middle School, and Walkersville High School.

== Notable people ==
- Charles Broadway Rouss (1836–1902), businessman and philanthropist
