= LeGore Bridge =

- U.S. National Register of Historic Places
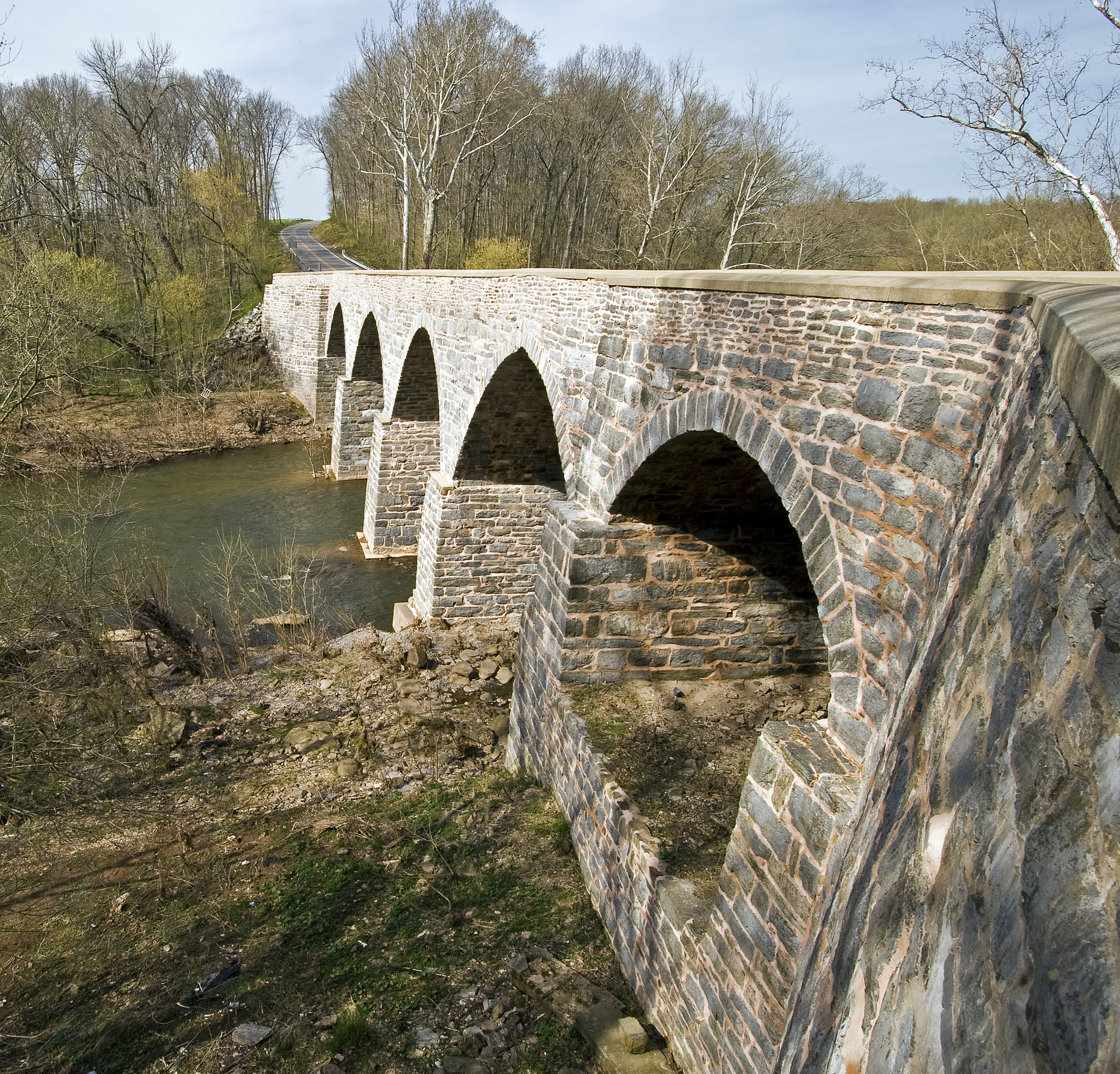

- Location within Maryland Location within the United States
- Location: North of Woodsboro over the Monocacy River, Woodsboro, Maryland
- Coordinates: 39°34′50″N 77°18′50″W
- Area: 1 acre (0.40 ha)
- Built by: LeGore, James W.
- Architectural style: Five-span stone arch
- NRHP reference No.: 78001464
- Added to NRHP: September 18, 1978

Begun in 1898 in rural Frederick County, Maryland, the LeGore Bridge was completed and opened to the public in 1900. It was built and maintained by the owners of the LeGore Lime Company, including local businessman James William LeGore and his company advisor, Eugene Hammond. It is 340 feet (100 m) in length, 27 feet (8.2 m) wide and 64 feet (20 m) high. The bridge is situated at 39°35'N 77°19'W. The five arch limestone bridge was restored in 1981 and 2009.

The bridge was built for three purposes:

- as part of a hydroelectric dam for an electric railway going from the Nation's Capital to Gettysburg, Pennsylvania,
- for transport of limestone from the LeGore Quarry to sales companies in Pennsylvania, and
- to accommodate the state-owned road for public travel across the Monocacy River.

Several decades have passed and the LeGore Bridge is still used for everyday automobile traffic.

The structure was included in the National Register of Historic Places in 1978.
