= Edward Caledon Bruce =

American deaf artist and author (1825–1900)

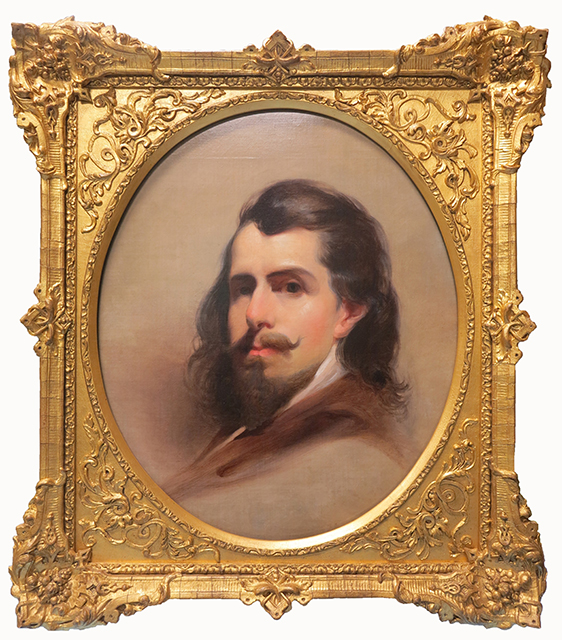
An 1855 self-portrait displayed at Abram's Delight in Bruce's hometown of Winchester, Virginia

Edward Caledon Bruce (May 26, 1825 – November 24, 1900) was an American artist, author, and publisher. Born in Winchester, Virginia, to educated and wealthy parents, he became deaf in his teens due to complications from scarlet fever. It was around this time Bruce began showing an interest in art. A few years later, he studied under Thomas Sully in Philadelphia. Bruce kept a diary in which he wrote "thank God I have my sight yet — all Nature can speak to me through that sense." He married Eliza T. Hubard with whom he had two daughters.

He was a successful author of several books, and the publisher and editor of the Winchester Virginian newspaper. He contributed articles to national magazines, including Harper's Weekly and Lippincott's Monthly Magazine. Bruce was a slaveowner and supported the secession of Virginia during the Civil War. Unable to fight due to his hearing loss, Bruce nonetheless provided artwork of the war, including sketches of fights and portraits of notable people. His most famous work, a portrait of General Robert E. Lee, was painted in the fall and winter of 1864–65. His other portraits include that of General Stonewall Jackson and Colonel John S. Mosby. He continued painting after the war and died in 1900.

Over 70 of Bruce's paintings, mostly portraits, survive and are exhibited in places such as the National Portrait Gallery, the Virginia Historical Society, the Abram's Delight historic house museum, and the Museum of the Shenandoah Valley, which owns the largest single collection of his portratis.

== Early life ==
Edward Caledon Bruce was born on May 26, 1825, in Winchester, Virginia. His parents were John Bruce (1795–1855) and Sidney Smith Bruce (1794–1874). John had emigrated from Scotland and became a prosperous teacher and businessman, playing a role in the Shenandoah Valley's first railroad. Sidney was born in the Tidewater region of Virginia to wealthy parents, who later moved their agriculture business to the Shenandoah Valley. Bruce's parents were both well-educated and had a large social network. Around the same time Bruce began showing an interest in art by copying portraits of his ancestors, he fell ill with scarlet fever. Complications from the disease resulted in Bruce becoming deaf around the age of 14.

In his late teens Bruce began studying with artist Thomas Sully in Philadelphia. Bruce's painting techniques, including brushwork and poses, were influenced by his time with Sully. When he was 20, Bruce traveled to New Orleans to deliver a portrait. He kept a diary during his trip, including his ride down the Mississippi River, which gives insights into the Antebellum South. In his diary, Bruce suggested he carried a notebook to write down what he thought people were saying to him and his written response.

In one diary entry, Bruce wrote: "It was like another glimpse of the world to me — shut out for six years by the iron hand of sorrow ...it is better to think to some purpose, and think to live instead of living to think. I have much to be thankful for, and in all that I have set my heart on my success has been encouraging ...thank God I have my sight yet — all Nature can speak to me through that sense." Bruce joined the American Art-Union and returned to Winchester to start his career. He married Eliza T. Hubard, a native of Norfolk, with whom he had two daughters. The Bruce family owned five slaves, which he may have communicated with by teaching them to read, despite anti-literacy laws in Virginia.

== Career ==
During his career, Bruce not only painted portraits but also worked as an author, illustrator, and the editor and publisher of the Winchester Virginian. He was a regular contributor to Harper's Weekly, both before and after the Civil War, and the Lippincott's Monthly Magazine. He authored several books and a 250-page volume about the 1876 Centennial Exposition. His early portraits often depicted subjects in different poses that did not face the artist, a reflection of his training with Sully and his desire to paint like hearing artists. Starting in the 1850s, his works showed the subjects facing more directly at him, allowing him to see their facial cues. An example of this is his portrait of Thomas Glass, painted in the early 1860s.

During the Civil War, he could not join the Confederate Army due to being completely deaf, but he did serve as a "civilian combat artist." His artistry during the war mostly took place in Richmond, where he painted a rare portrait painting of General Robert E. Lee while the war was taking place. It was painted between 1864 and 1865 and exhibited in the Virginia State Capitol from February 1865 to the war's conclusion. The original has been lost, but there are surviving studies of the upper portion of the painting. A Richmond Evening Journal article from 1907 called the portrait "the most valuable memorial" at the Stewart–Lee House, which had been given to the Virginia Historical Society (VHS). The article said soldiers considered the portrait a "very good likeness," and that it had been purchased from Bruce by J. B. McCaw, who later bequeathed it to the VHS. In addition to Lee, Bruce painted portraits of General Stonewall Jackson and Colonel John S. Mosby.

Bruce continued his portrait work until shortly before his death in 1900, with his last painting being a portrait of Supreme Court Justice and Founding Father John Marshall, based on an original work by Cephas Thompson. In his obituary in The Richmond Dispatch, Bruce was described as one of the state's best known antebellum editors whose articles were immensely popular. It was also noted he was an "ardent secessionist", an "artist of ability", and whose portrait of Lee was the "only canvas portrait of that general taken from life." The Museum of the Shenandoah Valley (MSV) describes Bruce as "one of the Shenandoah Valley's most talented native painters." Bruce's works include over 70 surviving paintings, many of these portraits, which are held in various museums and private collections.

== Legacy ==
The MSV is home to the largest single collection of Bruce's portraits, many of which are ancestors of Julian Wood Glass Jr., displayed in the Glen Burnie house. The partial-length portrait of Lee is on display in the National Portrait Gallery, which acquired it in the 1970s. Two historic house museums in Winchester each have a portrait by Bruce: a self-portrait hangs in Abram's Delight and the portrait of Jackson at the Battle of Port Republic is at the Stonewall Jackson's Headquarters Museum. The VHS holds a collection of 19 items related to the Bruce family, including the painting Lee's Headquarters, October 1864, amongst other works by Bruce. Bruce is included in the Library of Virginia's Virginia Deaf Culture Digital Library, which is a digital map highlighting key figures and places in the state's deaf culture.

== Selected works ==
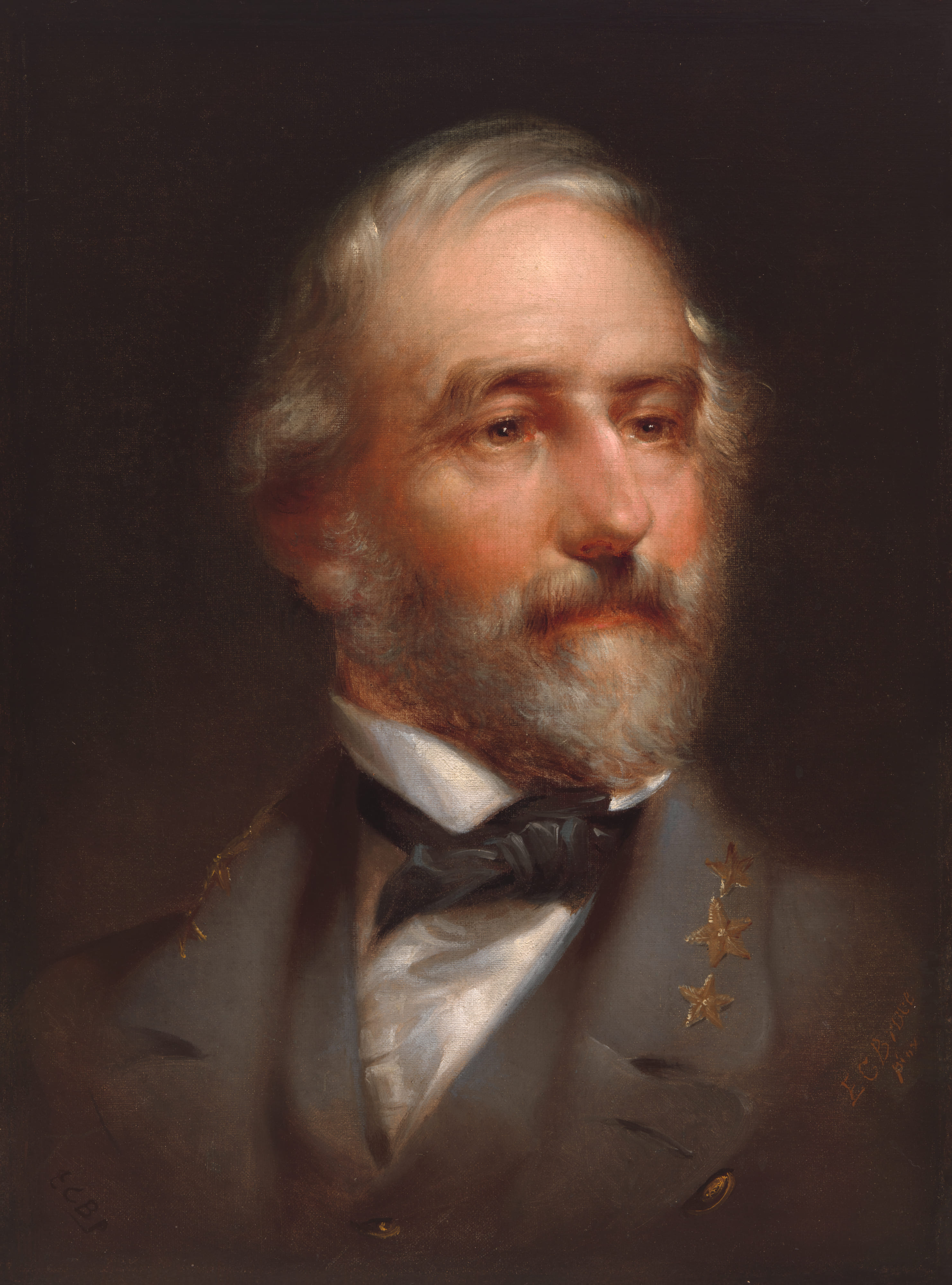
Robert E. Lee, National Portrait Gallery

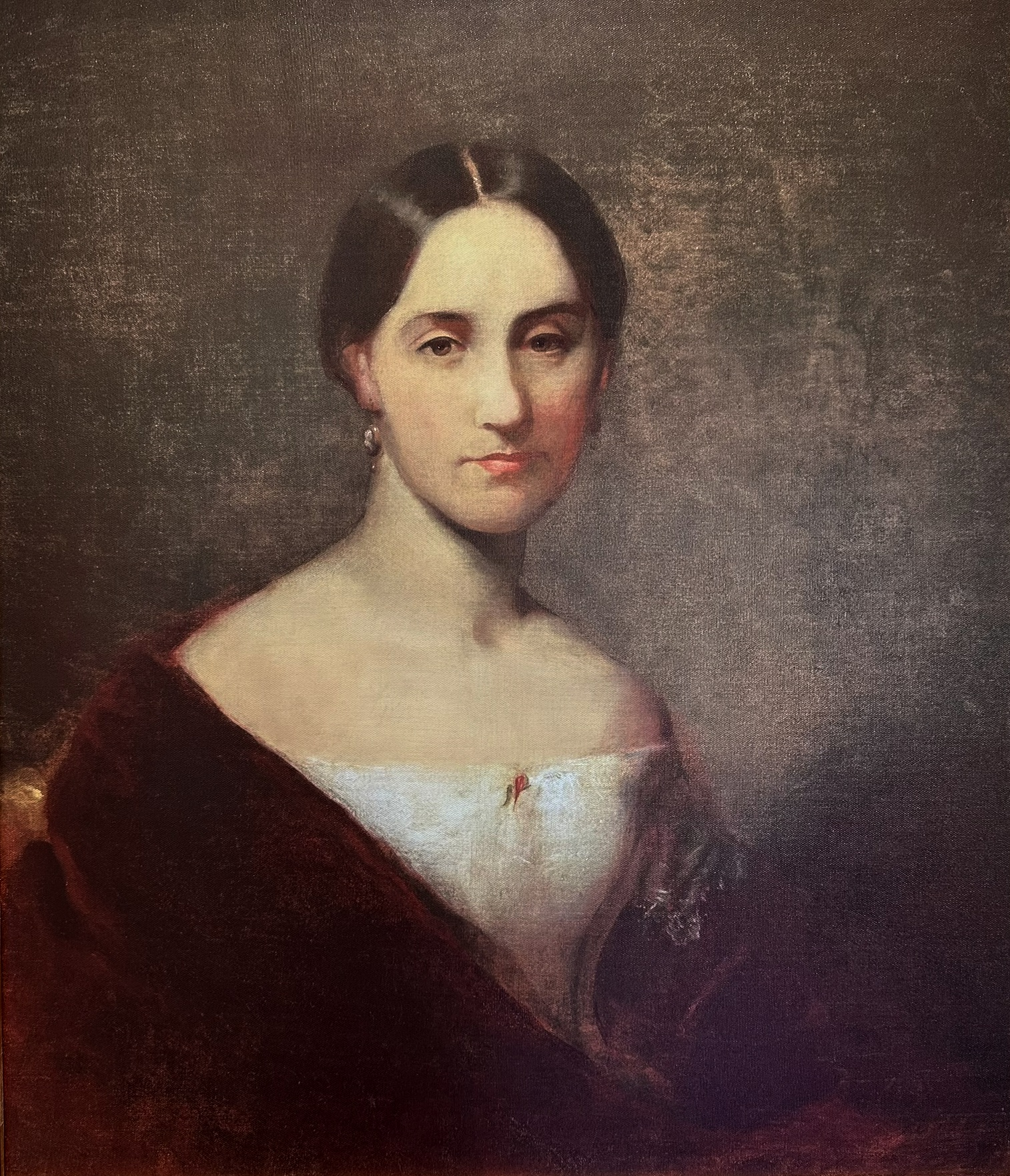
Portrait of Mrs. William Wood Glass (Nan L. Luckett), Museum of the Shenandoah Valley

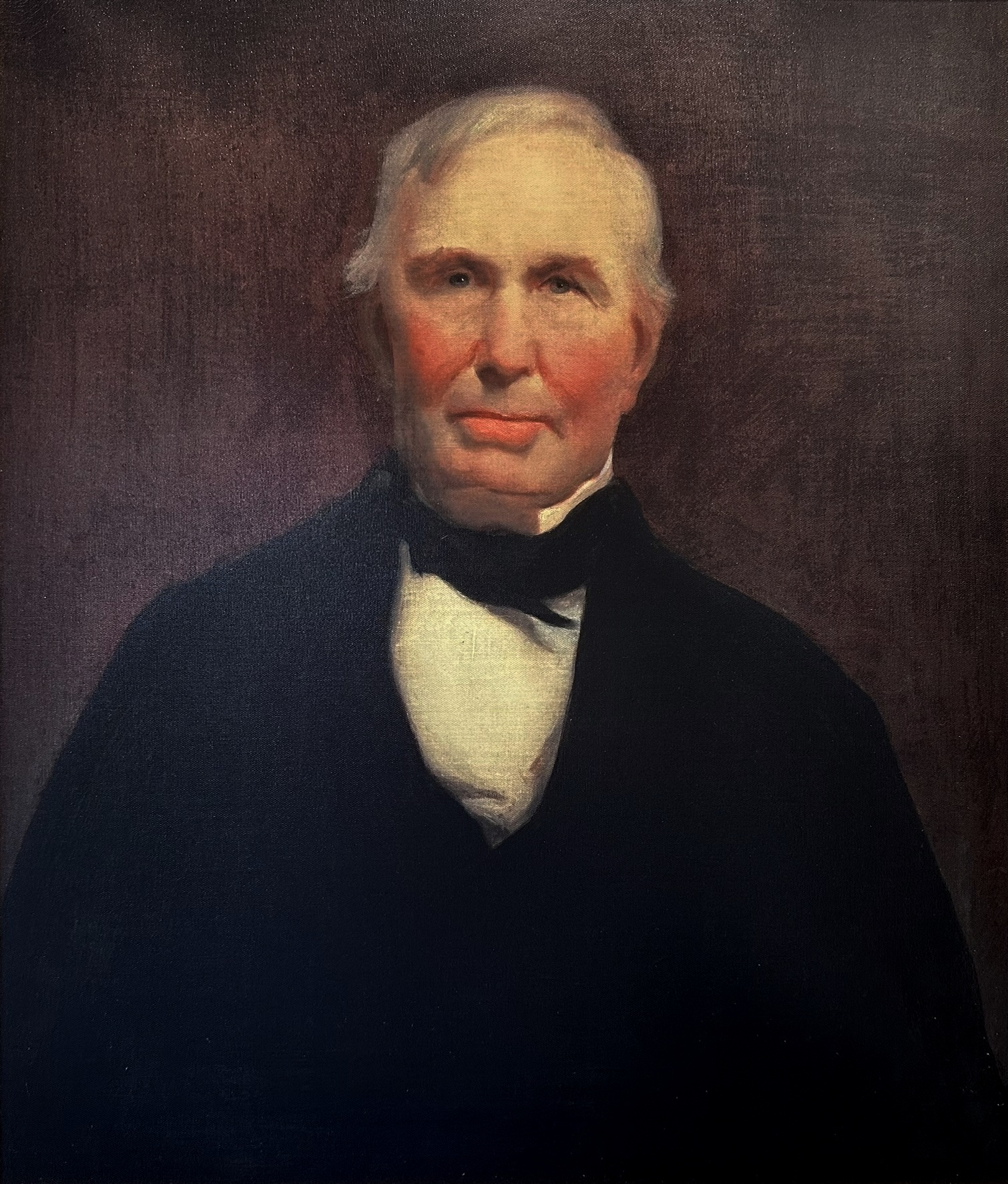
Portrait of Thomas Glass, Museum of the Shenandoah Valley

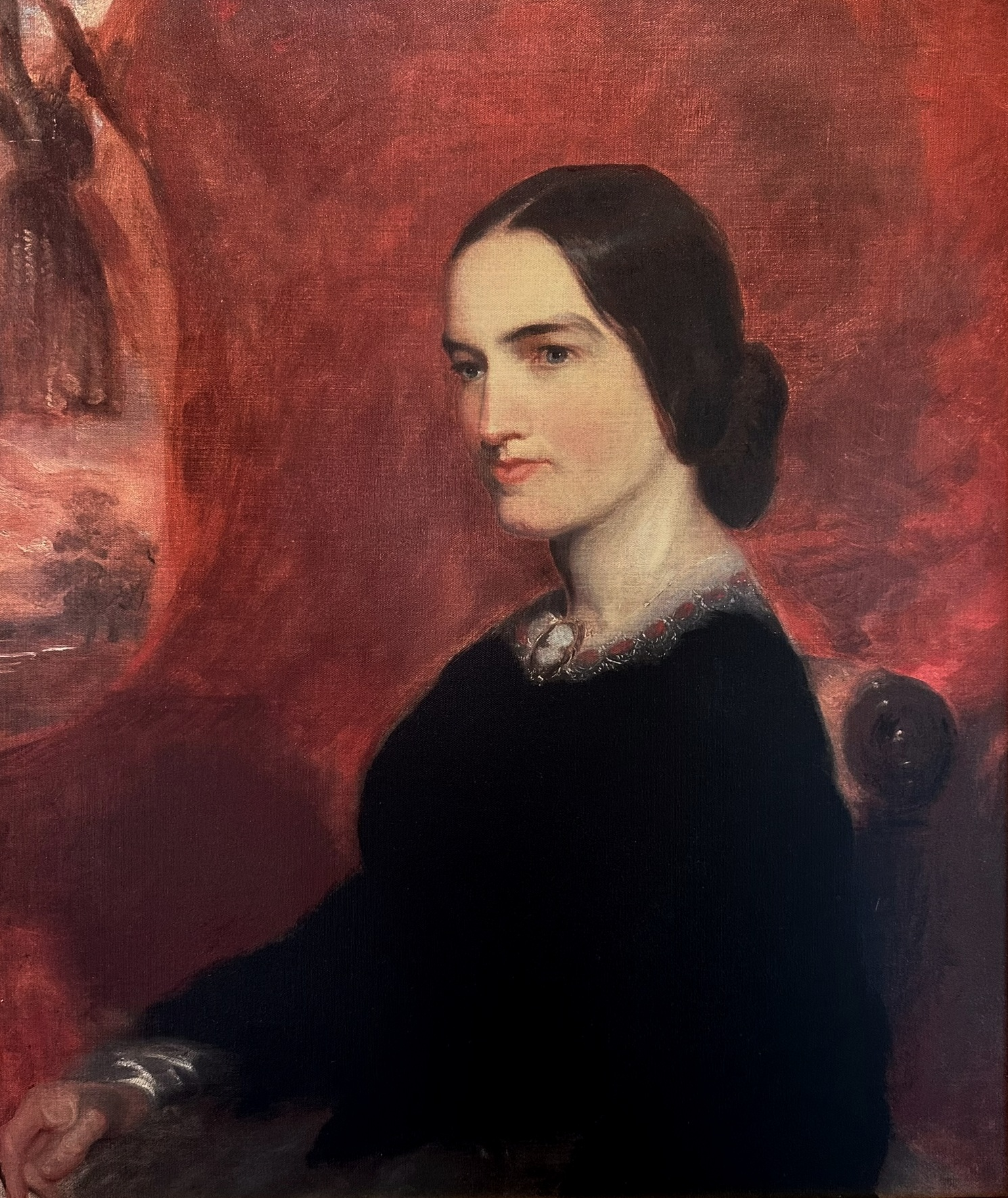
Portrait of Mrs. William Wood Glass (Nan R. Campbell), Museum of the Shenandoah Valley

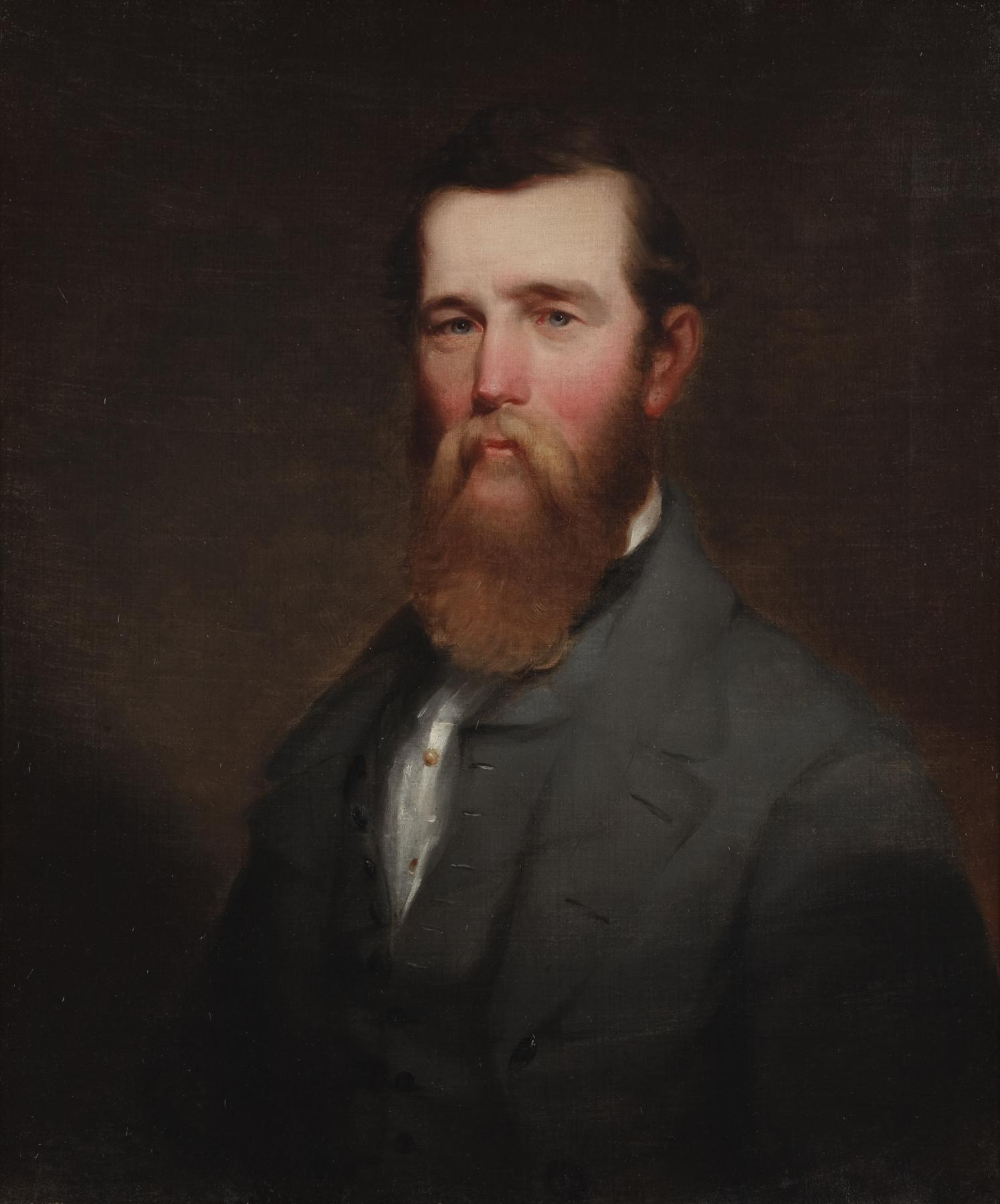
William Wood Glass, Museum of the Shenandoah Valley

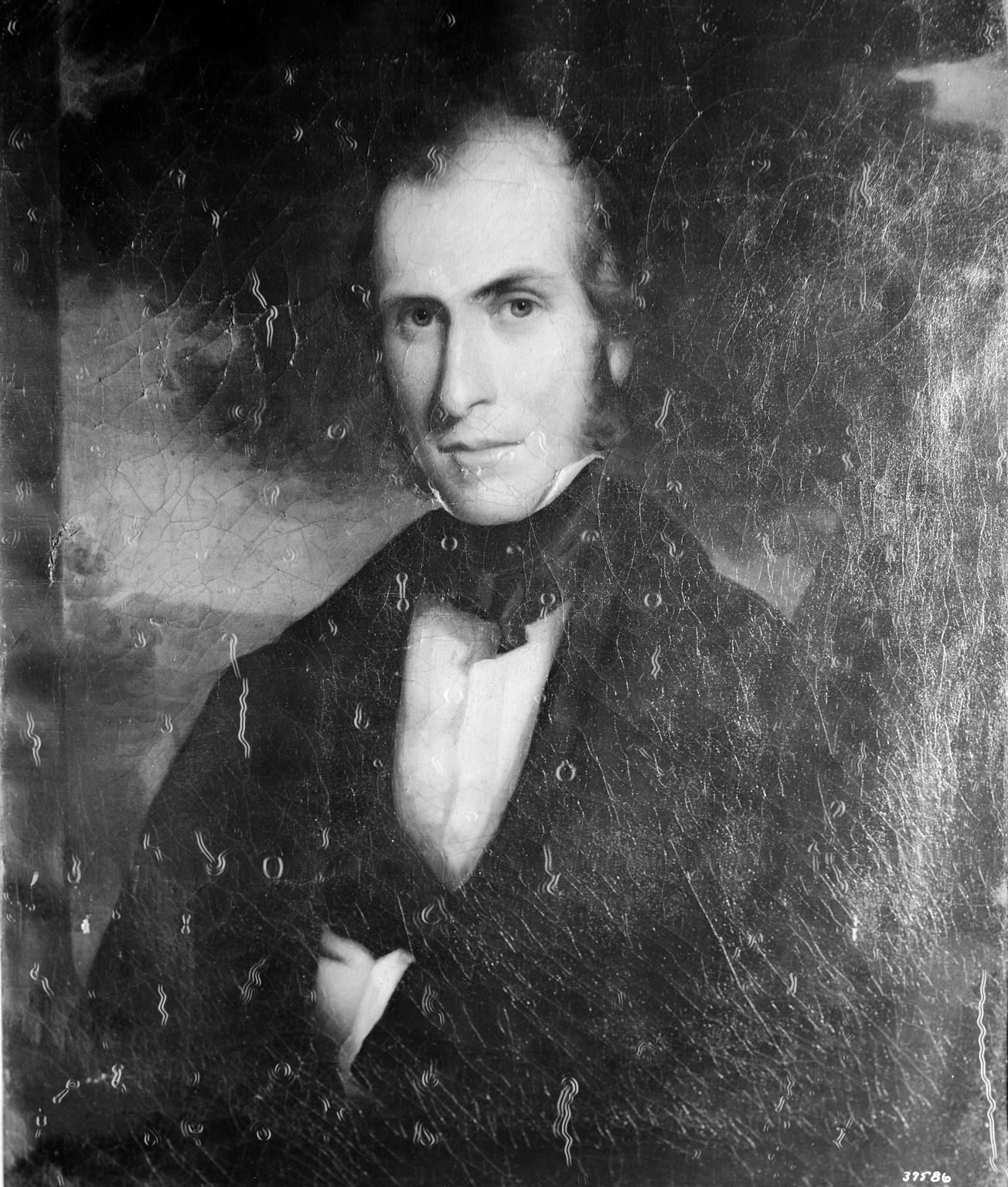
Allen Bowie Davis, Frick Art Research Library Photoarchive
