= Winchester National Cemetery =

Historic veterans cemetery in Winchester County, Virginia

- U.S. National Register of Historic Places
- Virginia Landmarks Register
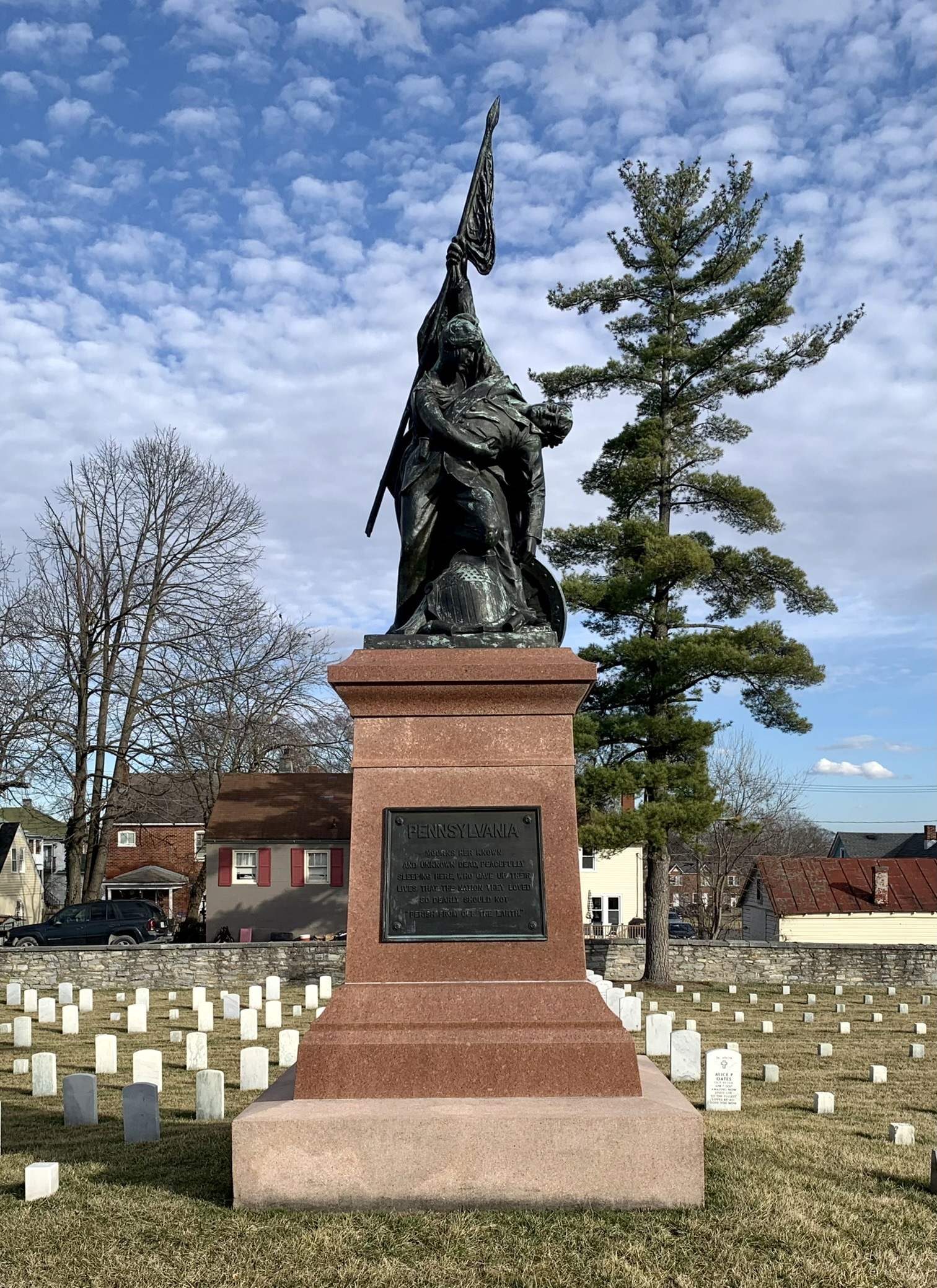
- Pennsylvania Memorial

- Location within Virginia Location within the United States
- Location: 401 National Ave., Winchester, Virginia
- Coordinates: 39°11′04″N 78°09′23″W
- Area: 4.9 acres (2.0 ha)
- Architect: Meigs, Montgomery C.
- Architectural style: Tudor Revival
- MPS: Civil War Era National Cemeteries MPS
- NRHP reference No.: 96000032
- VLR No.: 138-0035

Significant dates
- Added to NRHP: February 26, 1996
- Designated VLR: October 18, 1995

Winchester National Cemetery is a United States National Cemetery located in the city of Winchester in Frederick County, Virginia. Administered by the United States Department of Veterans Affairs, it encompasses 4.9 acres (2.0 ha), and as of the end of 2005, it had 5,561 interments. It is closed to new interments.

The cemetery was used for burials of Union soldiers. The Stonewall Confederate Cemetery was for Confederate soldiers.

== History ==
The land around Winchester National Cemetery was used for burials as early as 1862, but after the Civil War additional land was appropriated by the federal government and it was officially dedicated on April 8, 1866. The land was not legally transferred to the U.S. government until Dec. 1, 1870, when the landowner, Jacob Baker, was paid $1,500 for the 4.89-acre (1.98 ha) tract and the deed was signed and executed.

Numerous Union soldiers from surrounding battlefields were reinterred here, including those from the different battles of Winchester, the Battle of Front Royal, Battle of New Market, Battle of Harpers Ferry, as well as actions at Snickers Gap, Martinsburg, West Virginia, and Romney, West Virginia.

The cemetery grounds underwent significant renovations during the 1930s, adding walls, maintenance buildings, and improving the headstones.

Winchester National Cemetery was listed on the National Register of Historic Places in 1996.

== Notable monuments ==
- There are 14 monuments to Union regiments, corps, and states that either are represented by some of the soldiers buried in the cemetery and/or had participants in the 3rd Battle of Winchester. The oldest monument dates to 1864 and was erected for the 38th Massachusetts Infantry. The monuments are as follows:
  - 12th Connecticut Infantry Monument (erected by the state of Connecticut on Oct. 19, 1890)
  - 13th Connecticut Infantry Monument (erected by the state of Connecticut)
  - 18th Connecticut Infantry Monument (erected by the state of Connecticut)
  - 14th New Hampshire Infantry Monument (erected 1868)
  - 114th New York Infantry Monument (erected by the state of New York)
  - 123rd Ohio Infantry Regiment Monument (installed in 1899 by the State of Ohio)
  - 34th Massachusetts Infantry Monument which includes a marble bust of Col. George D. Wells that sits atop a granite base
  - 38th Massachusetts Infantry Monument (erected 1864)
  - 3rd Massachusetts Cavalry Monument (dedicated in 1888)
  - a Massachusetts Monument features a bronze soldier atop a granite base (erected by the State of Massachusetts in 1907)
  - a Pennsylvania Monument (erected in 1890 by the Commonwealth of Pennsylvania)
  - two monuments for the 8th Vermont Infantry (one of these was erected in 1885 by Herbert E. Hill)
  - a monument to the 6th Army Corps (erected shortly after the Civil War).
- There are also two "monuments," typical to National Cemeteries created for reinterred Union soldiers. They are both seven feet, six inches (152 mm) in height, and are made of an original cast iron seacoast artillery tube, secured by a concrete base. One is located on each side of the flagpole. There is no inscription on either monument.
- An upright historical marker typical of those erected by the Virginia Department of Historic Resources is also near the opening of the cemetery, with a focus on the Third Battle of Winchester.

== Gallery ==
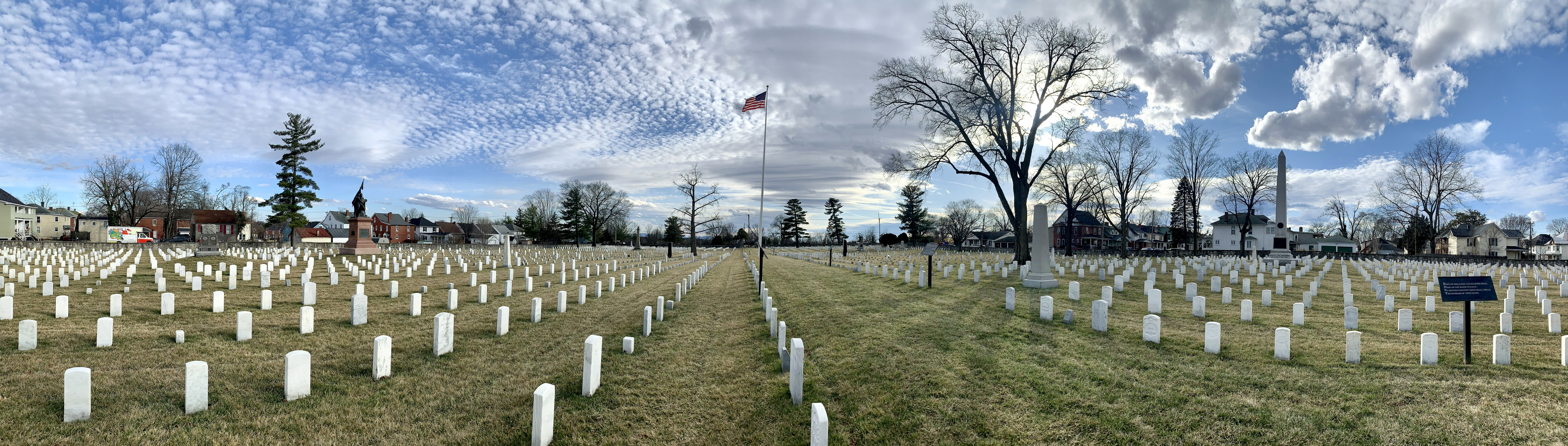
Winchester National Cemetery in 2022
