= Glen Burnie (Winchester, Virginia) =

Historic house in Virginia, United States

- U.S. National Register of Historic Places
- Virginia Landmarks Register
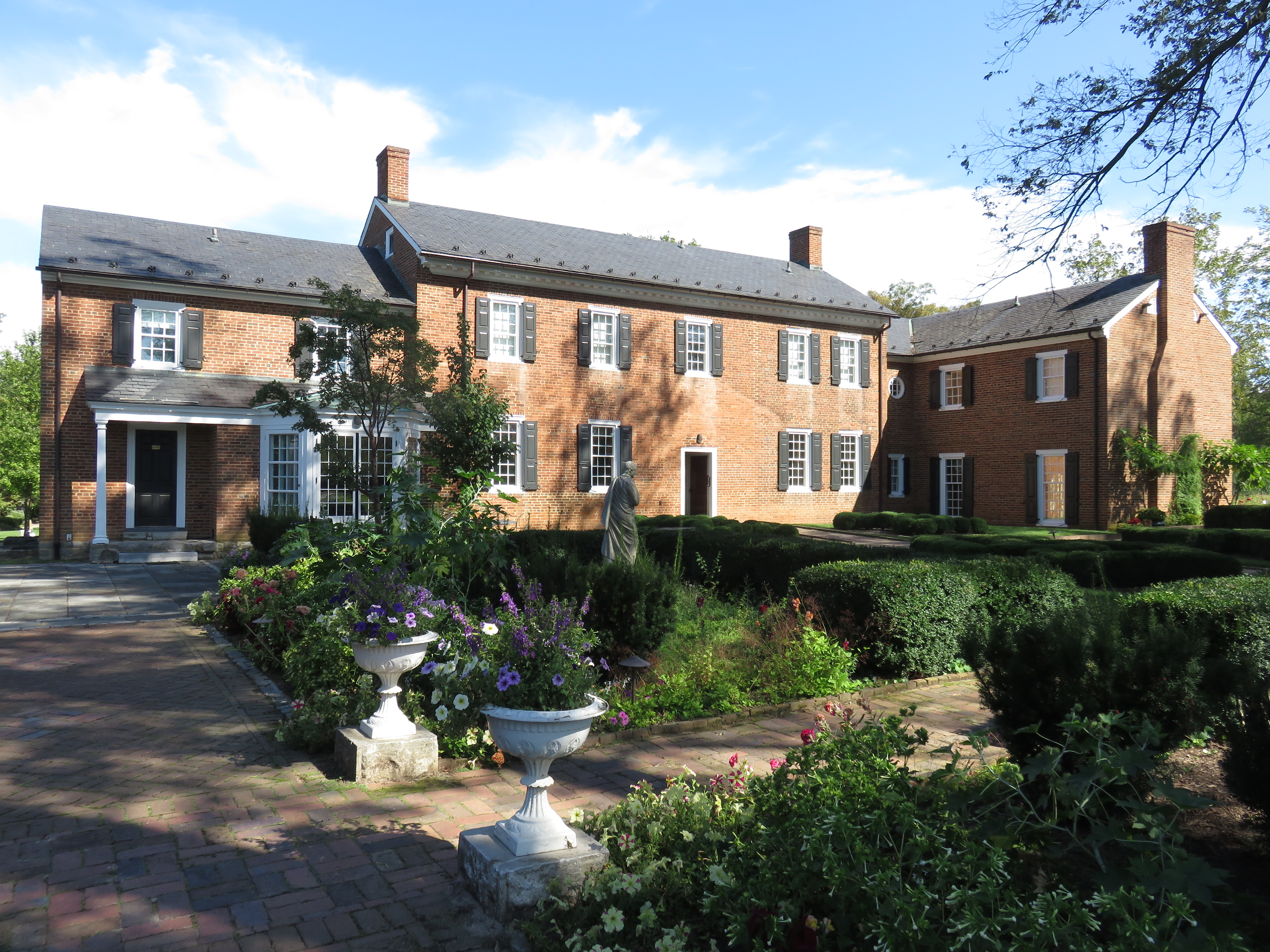
- Glen Burnie in 2019

- Location within Virginia Location within the United States
- Location: 801 Amherst St., Winchester, Virginia
- Coordinates: 39°11′13″N 78°10′43″W
- Area: 12 acres (4.9 ha)
- Built: 1794
- Architectural style: Georgian
- NRHP reference No.: 79003305
- VLR No.: 138-0008

Significant dates
- Added to NRHP: September 10, 1979
- Designated VLR: June 19, 1979

Glen Burnie is a historic home located at Winchester, Virginia. It consists of a 2 1/2-story central section built in two sections about 1794, with flanking two-bay, two-story wings built in 1959. It is a brick dwelling in the Georgian style.

Built in 1794 by Robert Wood, son of James and Mary Wood. James founded Frederick Town (later Winchester) in 1744.

It was added to the National Register of Historic Places in 1979.

The house is now part of the Museum of the Shenandoah Valley.

== Gallery ==
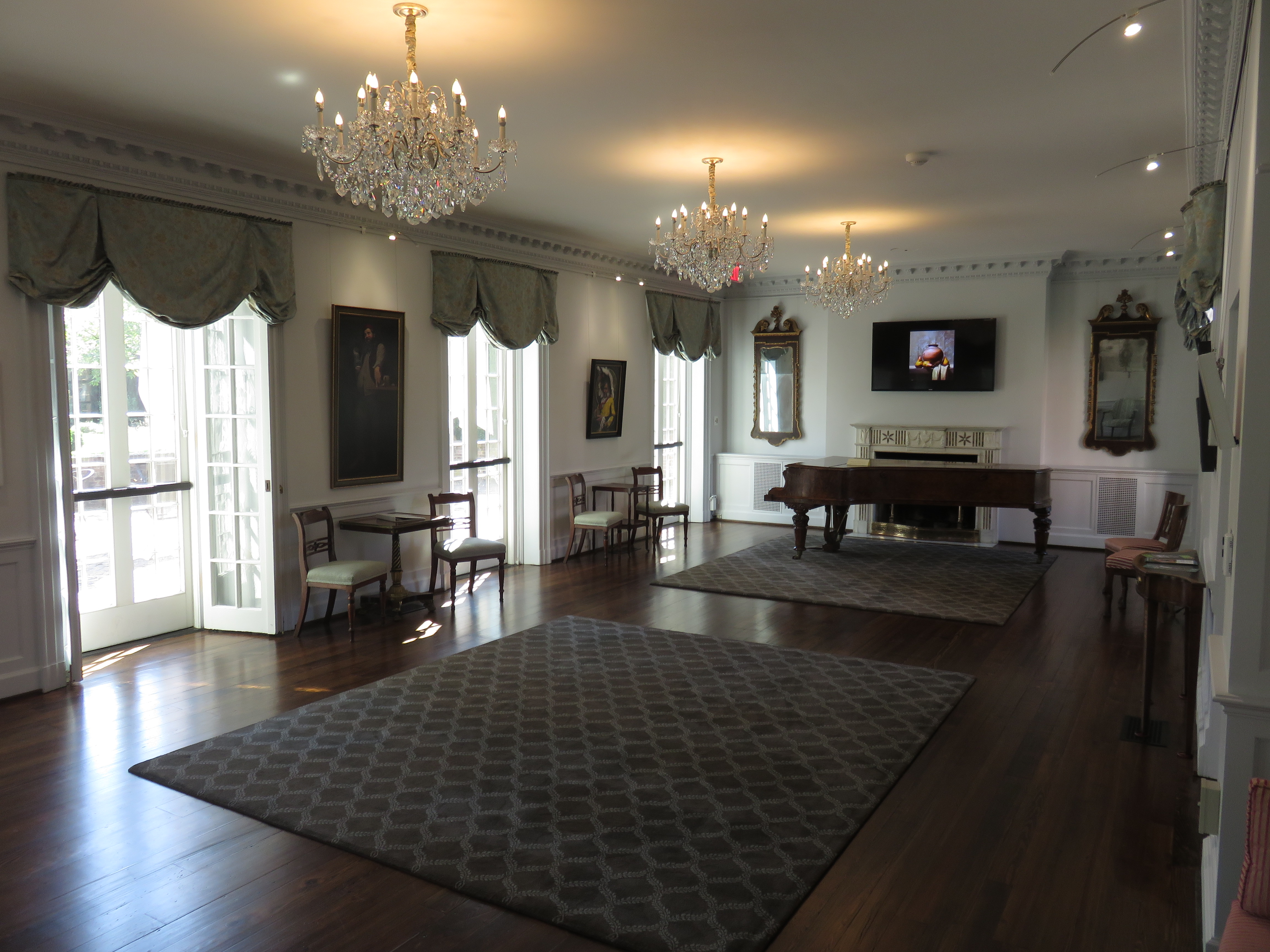
Interior

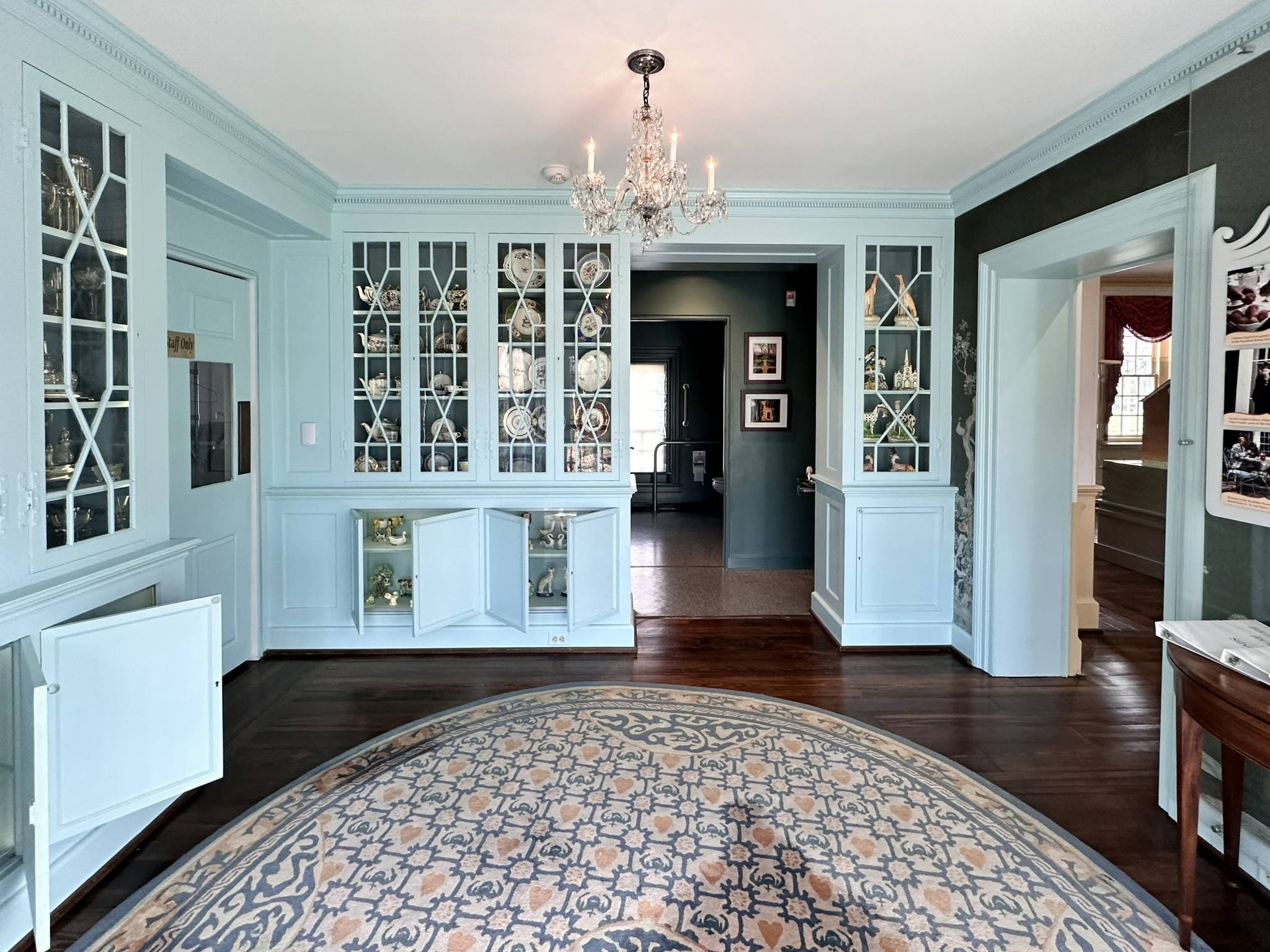
Interior

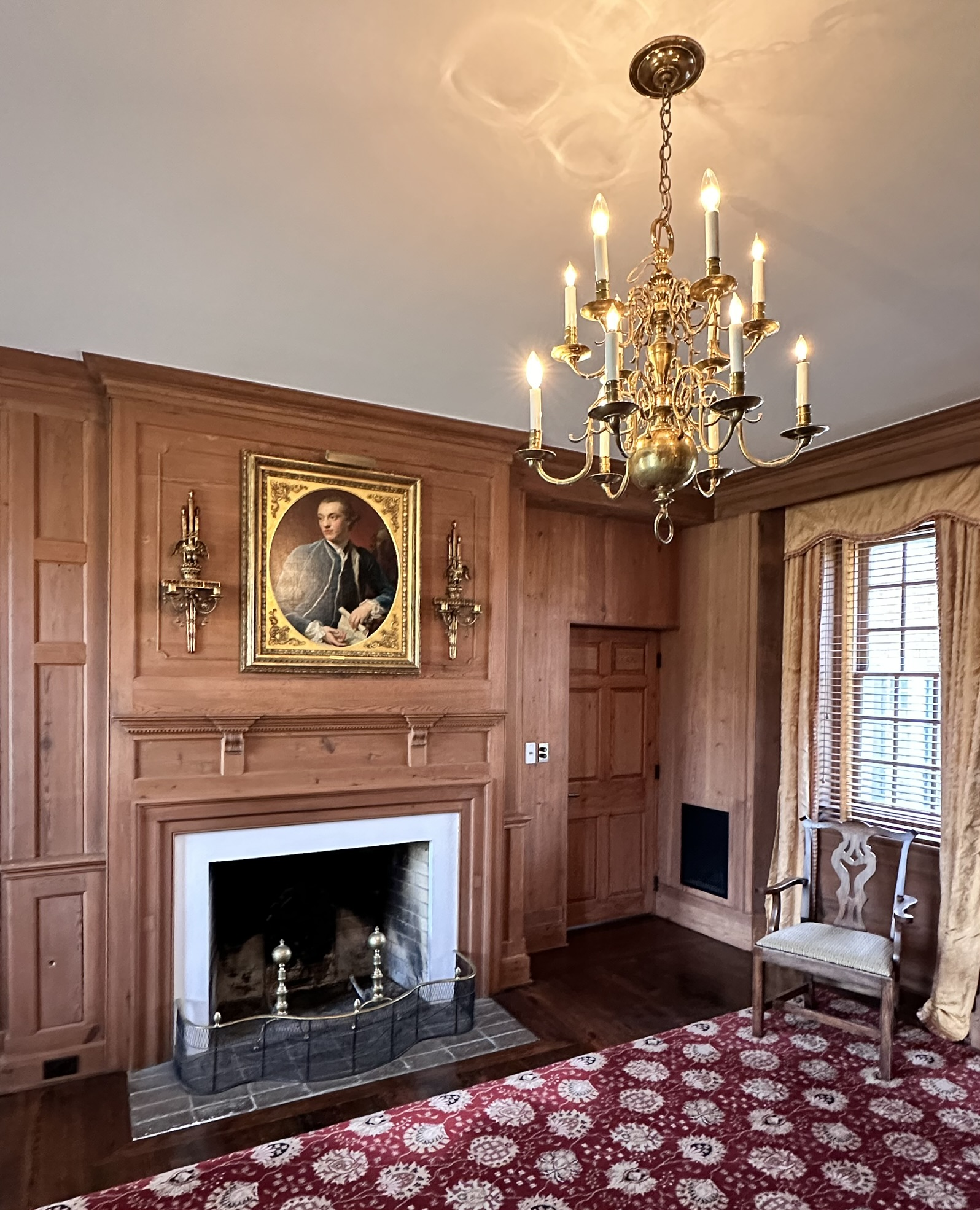
Fireplace

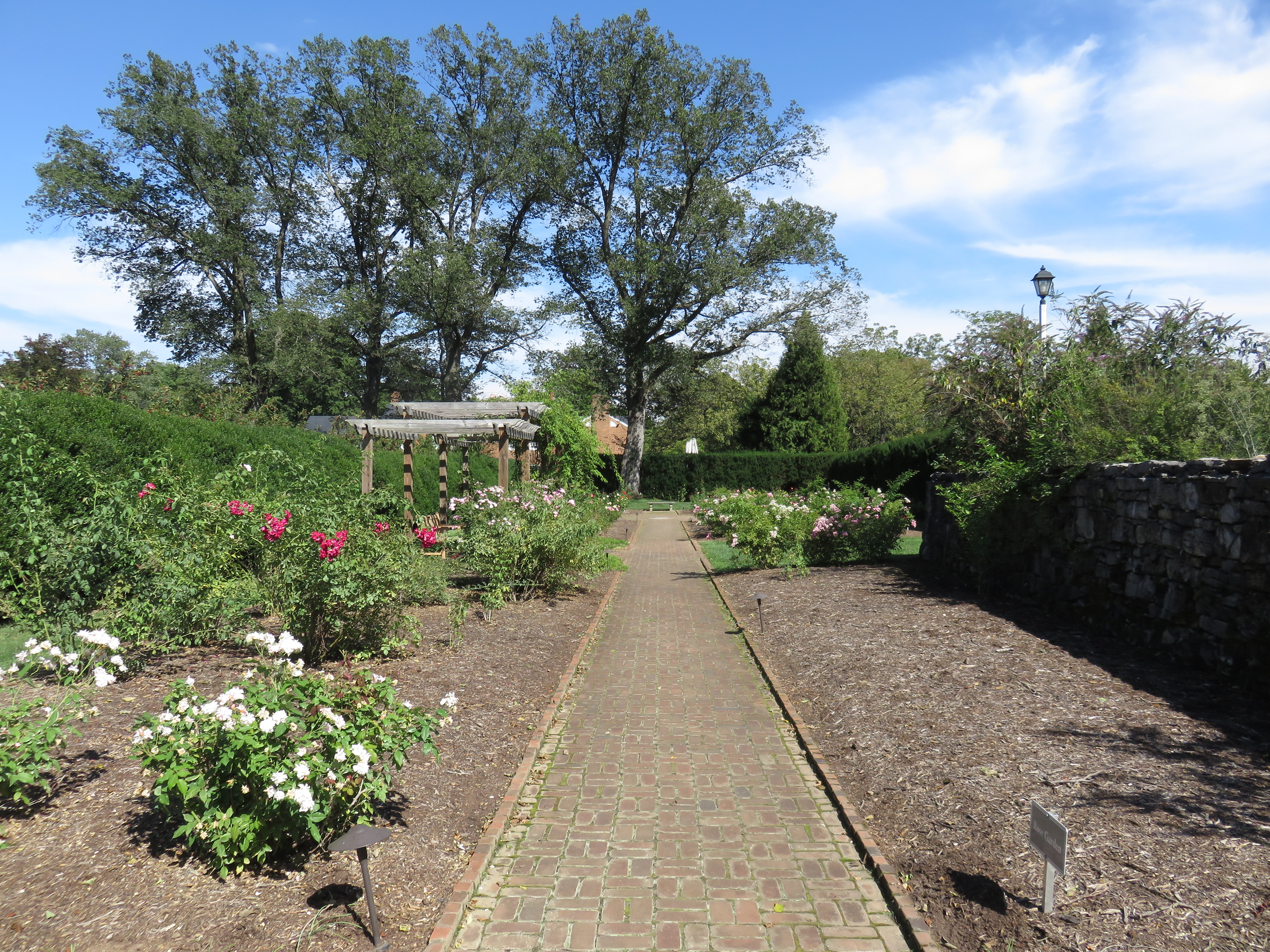
Gardens

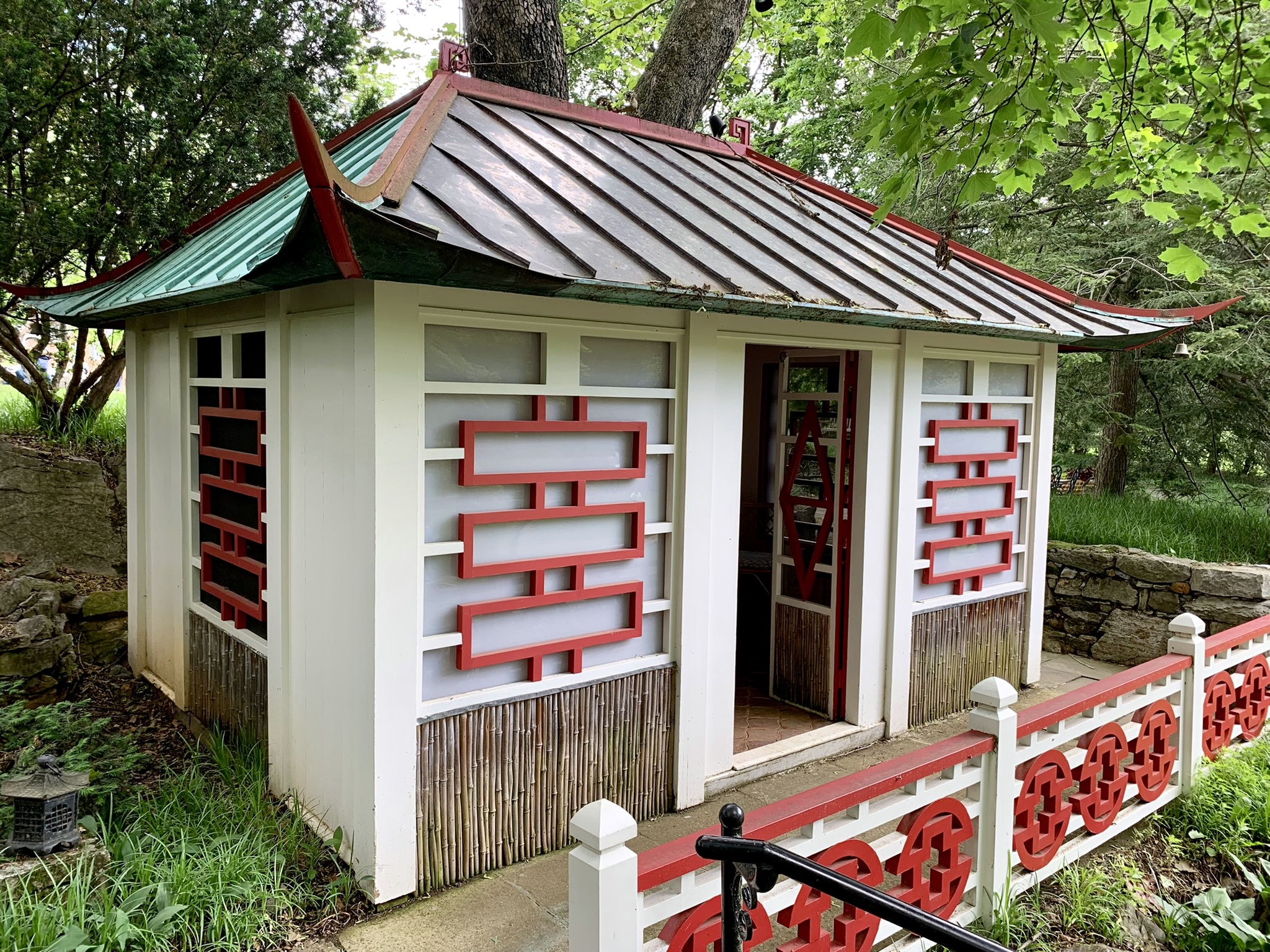
Teahouse

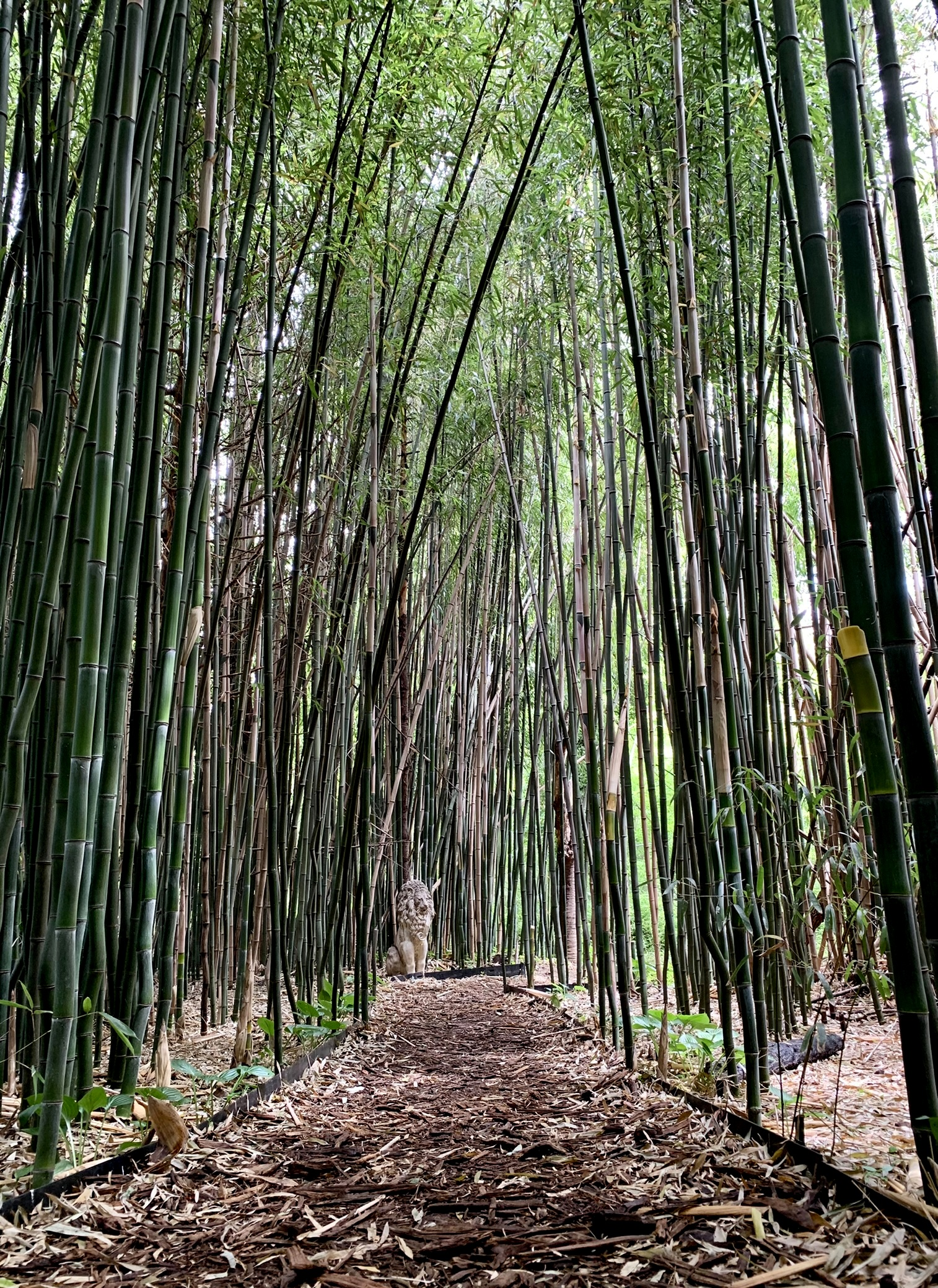
Bamboo maze

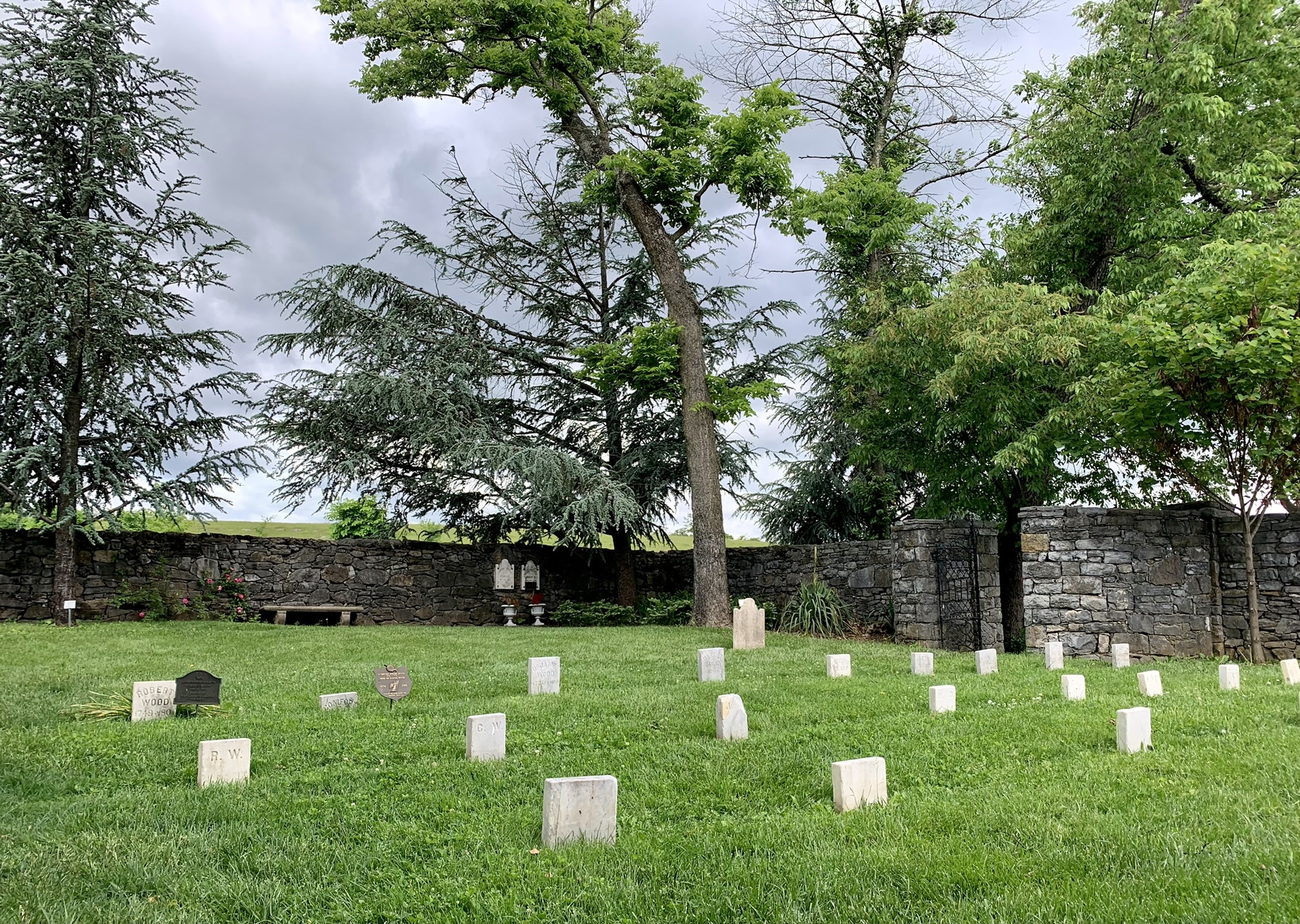
Family cemetery

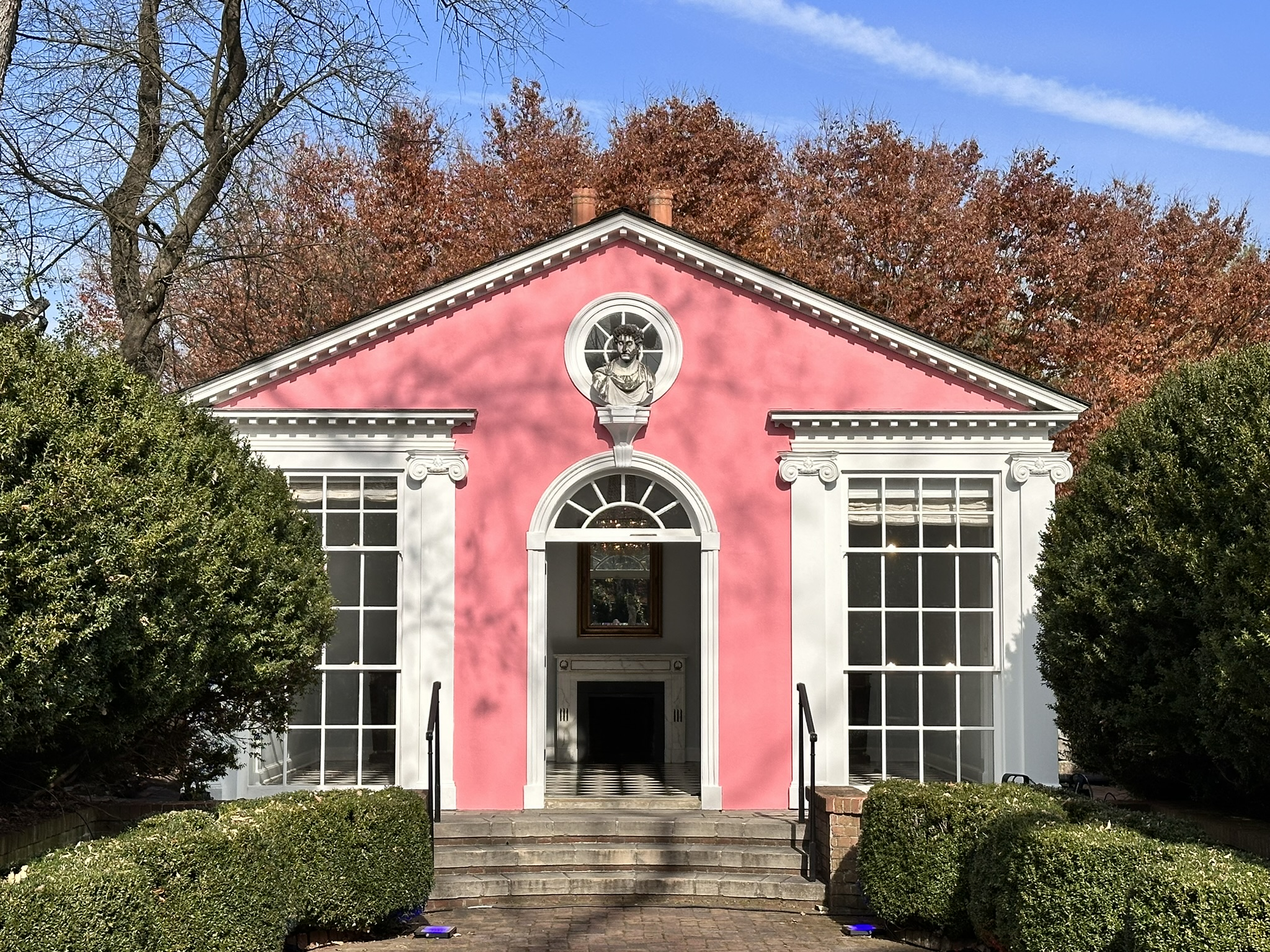
Pink Pavilion

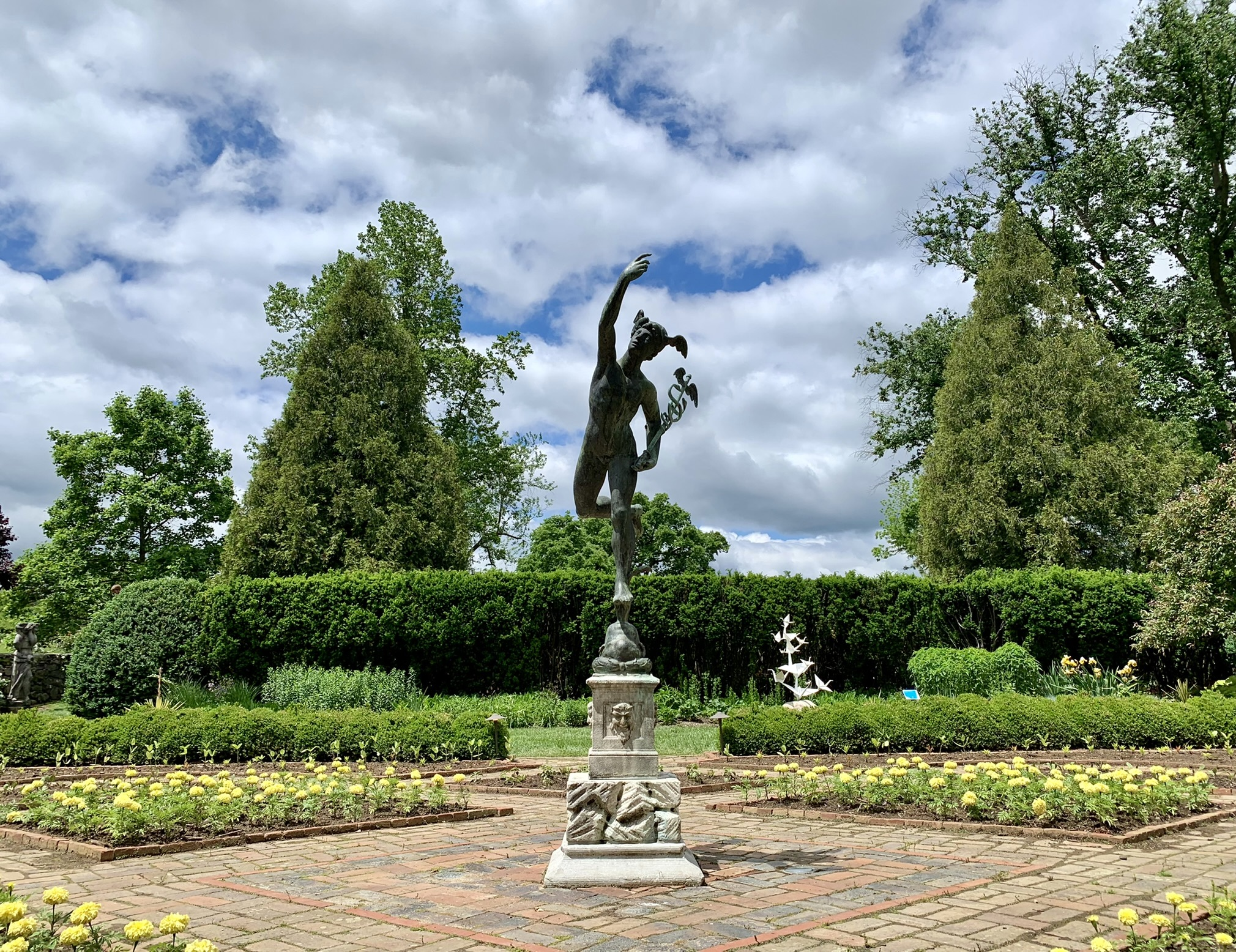
Mercurius by Giambologna

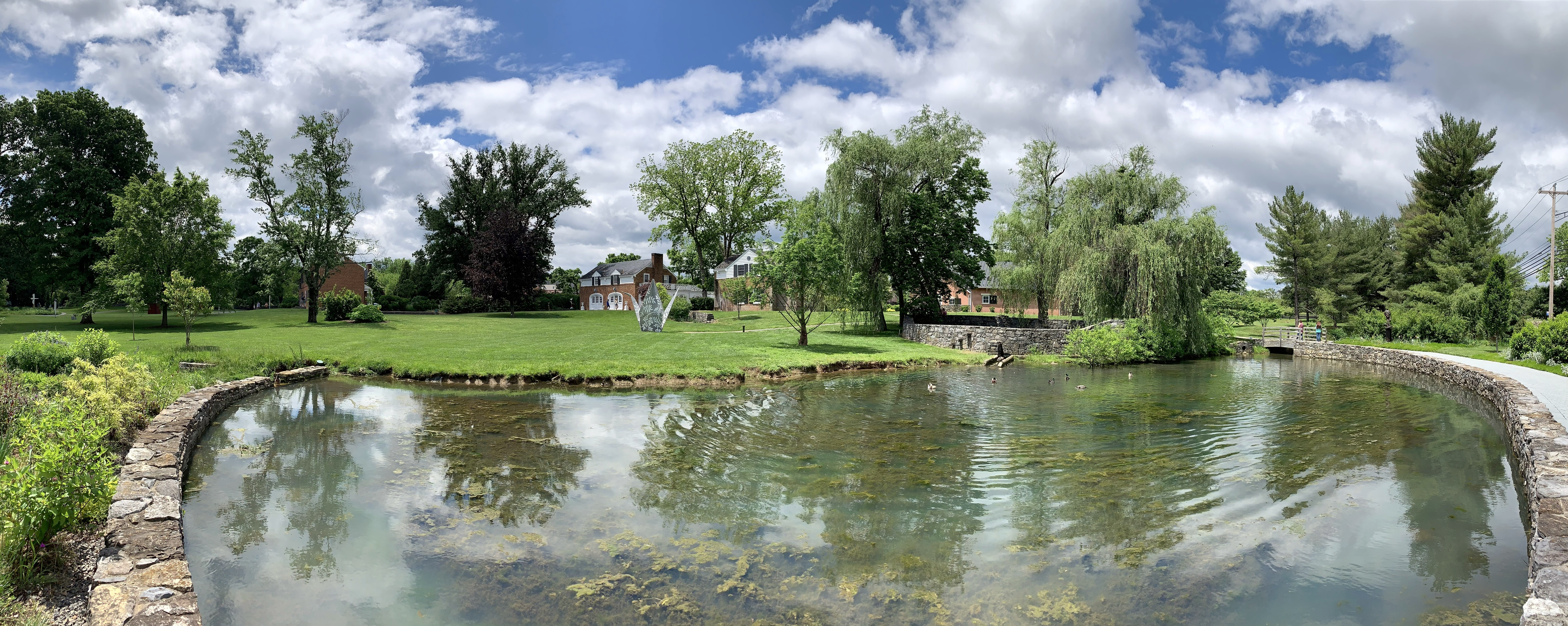
Pond and grounds

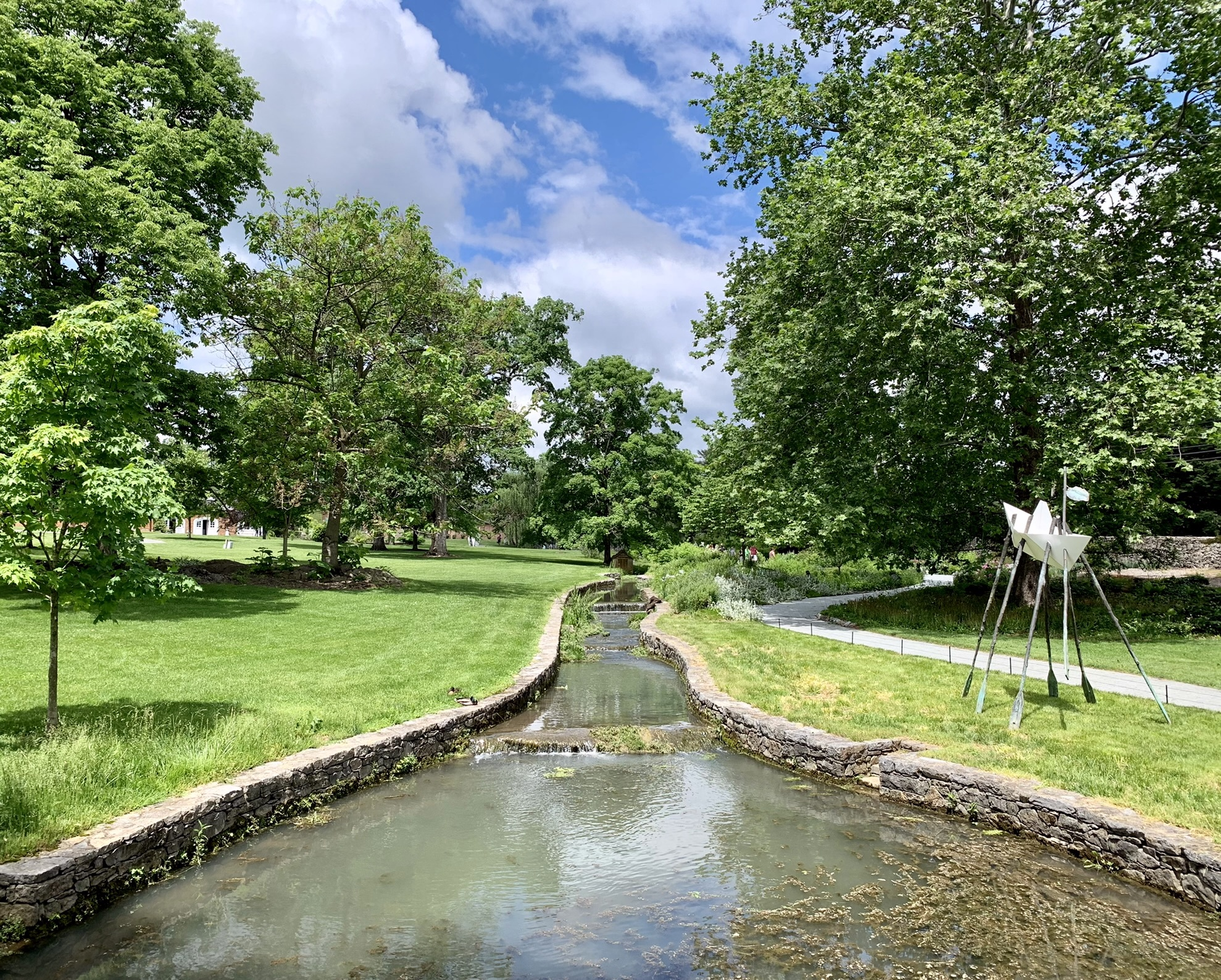
Stream

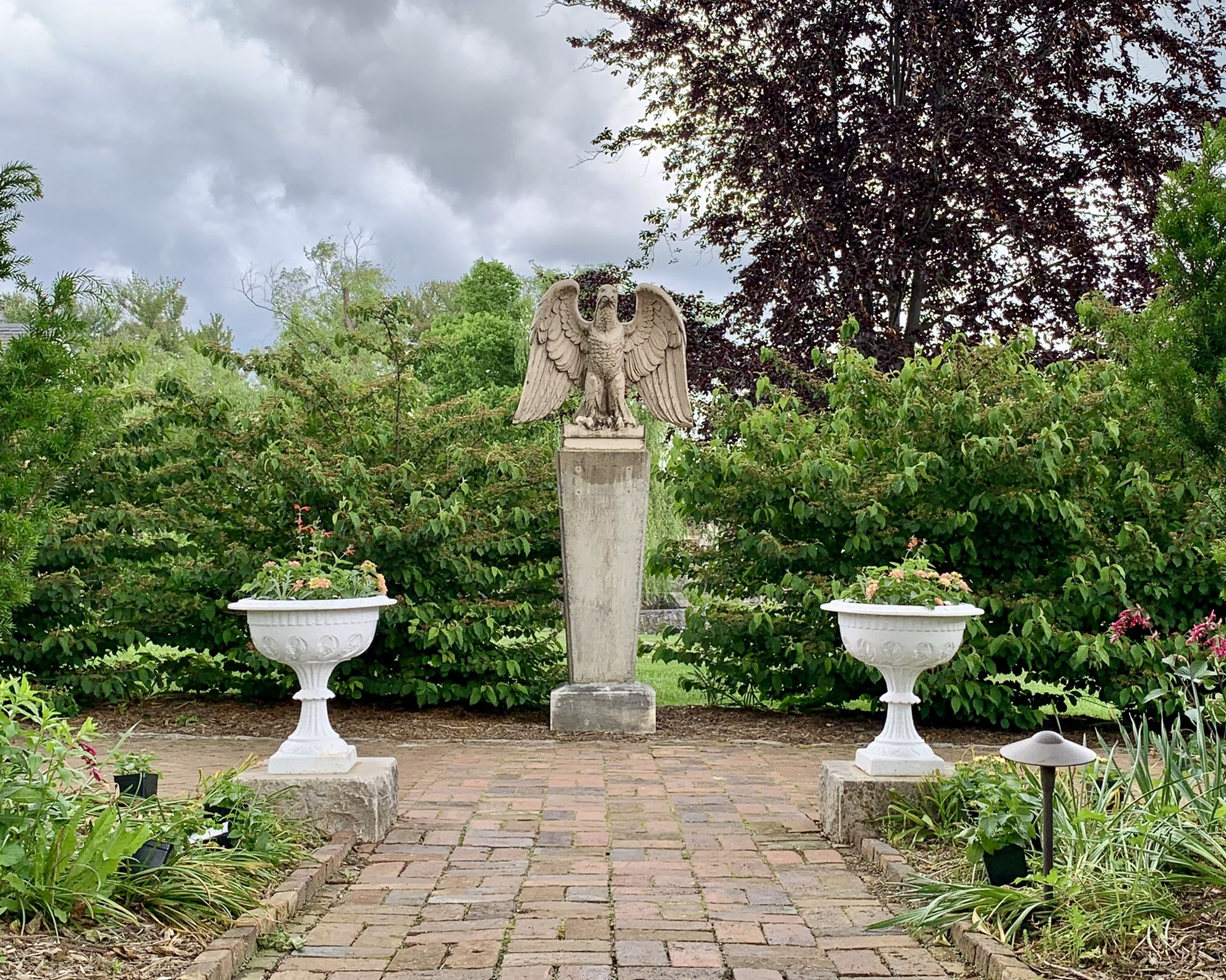
Garden sculpture
