= Woods Mill Farm =

Historic farm in Maryland, US

- U.S. National Register of Historic Places
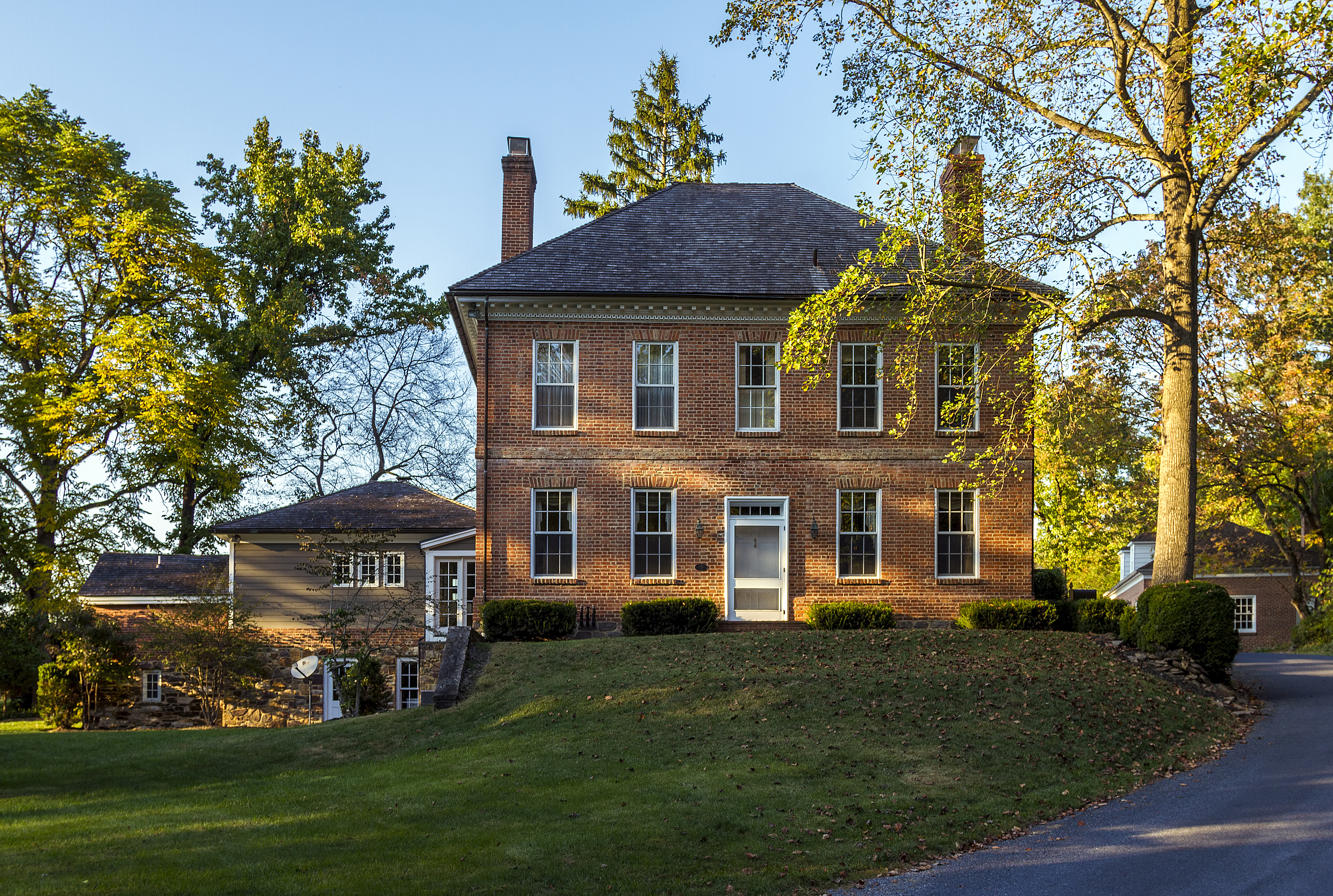

- Location within Maryland Location within the United States
- Location: 11210 Cash Smith Road, Woodsboro, Maryland
- Coordinates: 39°32′31.7″N 77°18′06.5″W
- Area: 25 acres (10 ha)
- Built: 1770
- Architectural style: Georgian
- NRHP reference No.: 07000812
- Added to NRHP: August 15, 2007

Woods Mill Farm is a historic home and farm complex located at Woodsboro, Frederick County, Maryland. It includes the Colonel Joseph Wood House and associated buildings. The house is an unusual example of an 18th-century brick, Georgian style manor house, built about 1770. It is a two-story brick dwelling with a hipped roof and inside end chimneys. The property also includes two distinctive outbuildings: a two-story, two-room stone and brick smokehouse with a gable roof and a brick end barn built about 1830. The original owner of this property was Col. Joseph Wood, founder of Woodsberry (now Woodsboro).

It was listed on the National Register of Historic Places in 2007.
