= Stonewall Confederate Cemetery =

Historic veterans cemetery in Winchester, Virginia

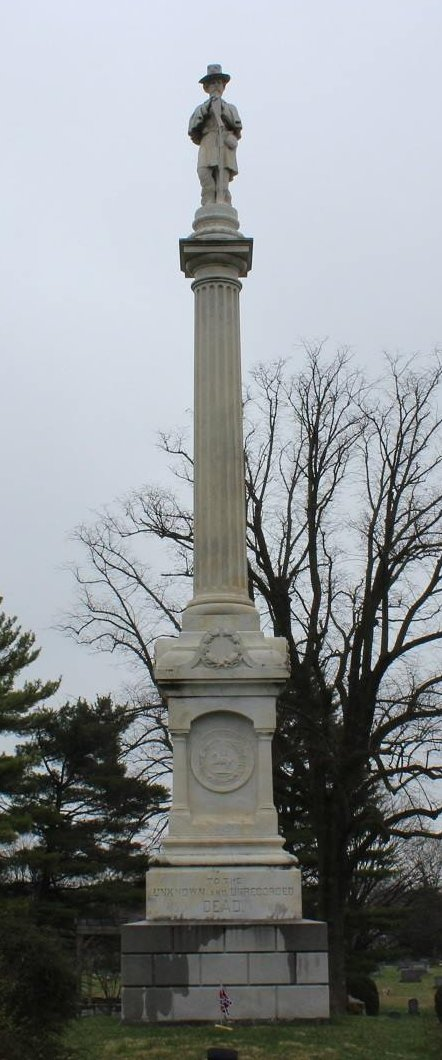
- Memorial to Confederate unknowns
- Interactive map of Stonewall Confederate Cemetery

Details
- Established: 1866
- Location: 305 E. Boscawen St., Winchester, Virginia
- Country: United States
- Coordinates: 39°11′00″N 78°09′23″W
- Owned by: Mount Hebron Cemetery
- No. of graves: 2,575
- Website: Stonewall Confederate Cemetery
- Find a Grave: Stonewall Confederate Cemetery

Stonewall Confederate Cemetery is a subsection of Mount Hebron Cemetery in Winchester, Virginia, established in 1866 for 2,575 Confederate soldiers who died in battle or in the hospitals in and around the Winchester area. A monument over the mass grave of more than 800 unknown Confederate soldiers is at the center of the cemetery, and there is a section for each state member of the Confederacy. The plots are thus organized according to the home states of the fallen soldiers within. There are state monuments in most of the sections.

== Notable burials ==
- The Brothers Ashby:
  - Brigadier General Turner Ashby (1828–1862), "Black Knight of the Confederacy", cavalry commander during Jackson's Valley Campaign, killed at Good's Farm
  - Captain Richard Ashby (1831–1861), killed by Union patrol near Hampshire County
- The Patton Brothers:
  - Colonel George Smith Patton (1833–1864), brigade commander during the Valley Campaigns of 1864, killed at Opequon; grandfather of General George S. Patton, army commander during World War II
  - Colonel Waller Tazewell Patton (1835–1863), commander of the 7th Virginia Infantry, mortally wounded during Pickett's Charge at Gettysburg
- Brigadier General Archibald Campbell Godwin (1831–1864), brigade commander during the Valley Campaigns of 1864, killed at Opequon
- Brigadier General Robert Daniel Johnston (1837–1919), brigade commander during the Overland Campaign and in the Valley Campaigns of 1864; father of Colonel Gordon Johnston, Medal of Honor recipient during Philippine–American War
- Major General John George Walker (1821–1893), Mexican–American War veteran, brigade commander during the Peninsula Campaign, commander of Walker's Greyhounds in the Western Theater
