= Echo (ship) =

Several vessels have been named Echo:

== Sail ==
- Echo (1790 ship) was launched in 1791 in Liverpool as a slave ship. She made two complete voyages from Liverpool in the Atlantic triangular slave trade. On her third voyage a French privateer captured her, but a British letter of marque recaptured her. She did not return to the slave trade and was last listed in 1796.
- Echo (1792 ship) was launched at Hull in 1792. She originally sailed to Greenland and Saint Petersburg. Then between 1794 and 1795 she made one voyage for the British East India Company (EIC). In 1799 a French privateer captured her.
- Echo (1799 ship) was launched at Hull in 1799. She quickly became a West Indiaman, sailing between Britain and Jamaica under a number of owners and masters. In 1826–1828 she made one voyage to Bengal, sailing under a licence from the British EIC. On her return to Liverpool, she immediately sailed for Canada, and was lost on 22 May 1828 near Lubec, Maine.
- Echo (1845 ship) — captured by USS Dolphin in 1858 with an illegal cargo of slaves from Africa

== Steam ==
- Echo (sternwheeler 1865) was a sternwheel steamboat that operated on the Willamette River from about 1865 to 1873 and was one of the first steamboats to carry what was then considered a large cargo out of Eugene, Oregon.
- Echo (steam tug) was built at Tacoma in 1900 and operated on Puget Sound for Foss Launch and Tug Company from 1916 to 1930.

== See also ==
- HMS Echo – any one of nine vessels of the British Royal Navy
- USS Echo
- Echo (disambiguation)
- Echo (slave ship)
