= Israel Greene =

American military officer (1824–1909)

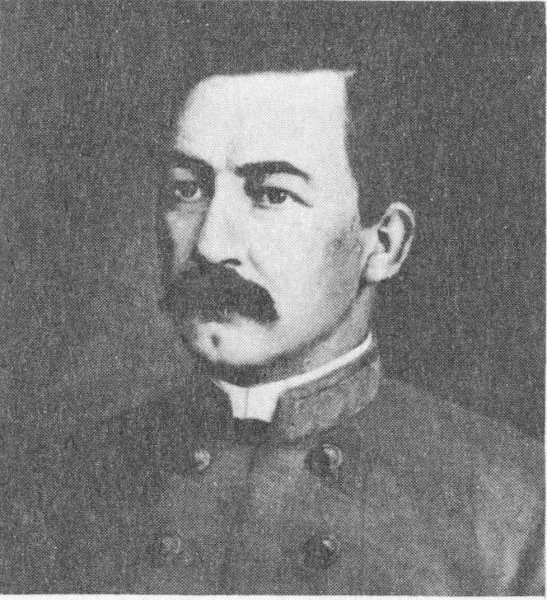
- Born: June 17, 1824; Plattsburgh, New York, U.S.
- Died: May 25, 1909 (aged 84); Mitchell, South Dakota, U.S.
- Burial place: Graceland Cemetery; Mitchell, South Dakota
- Military career
- Allegiance: United States; Confederate States
- Branch: U.S. Marine Corps; Confederate States Marine Corps
- Service years: 1847–1861 (U.S.); 1861–1865 (C.S.)
- Rank: First lieutenant (USMC); Major (CSMC)
- Conflicts: Harpers Ferry Raid; American Civil War

Israel Greene (June 17, 1824 – May 25, 1909) was a United States Marine Corps officer and the leader of the company of Marines who captured John Brown during his raid on Harpers Ferry. He later resigned his commission to serve as an officer in the Confederate States Marine Corps during the American Civil War.

== Early life and education ==
Greene was born in Plattsburgh, New York. He grew up in Wisconsin and later married a woman from Virginia.

== Career ==
=== Marine Corps ===
Greene joined the United States Marine Corps. He was commissioned a second lieutenant on March 3, 1847. In 1857, Greene, who advocated that Marines become artillerists, was sent to West Point to receive training as an artillerist. Afterward he returned to Washington to instruct Marines at the Washington Navy Yard. In April 1859, Greene became the commander of the Marine Barracks, Washington, D.C., and served as commander for two months. In November 1860, he led a detachment of Marines who accompanied the first Japanese diplomats to visit the United States on their return trip, on board the USS Niagara.

=== John Brown's raid ===
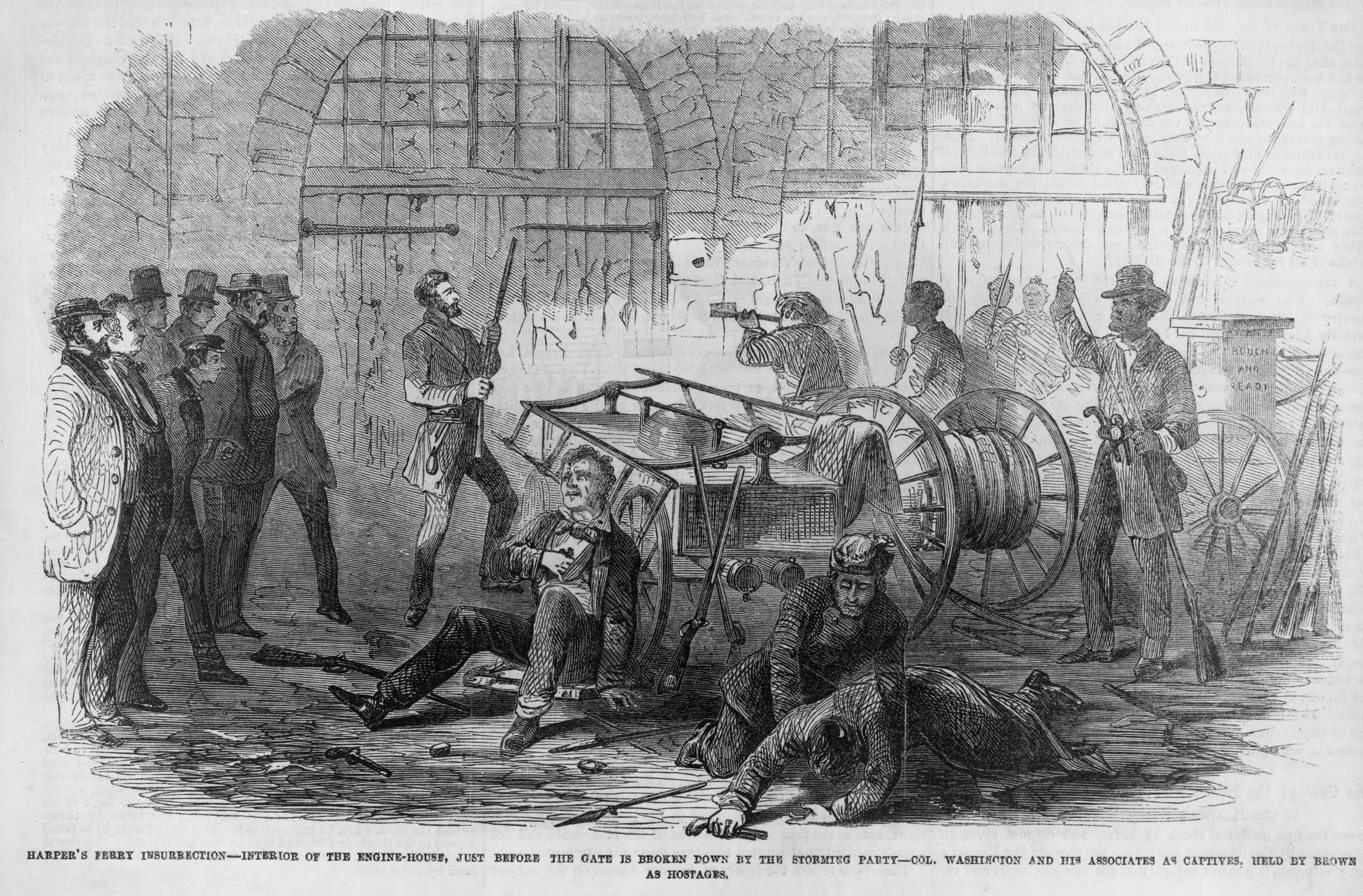
Harper's Weekly illustration of the Interior of the engine house prior to the storming by the Marines

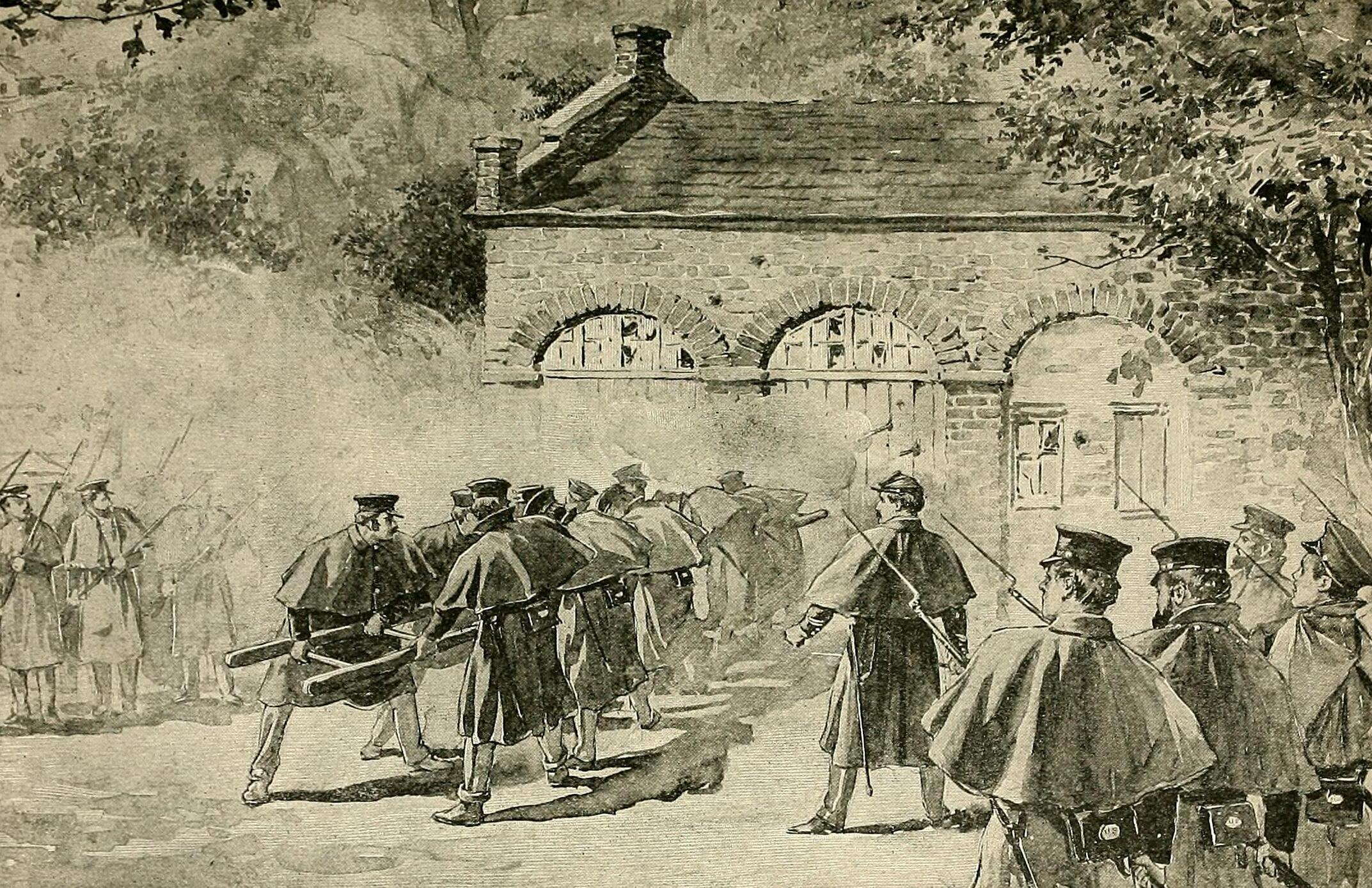
1897 illustration of the Marines storming the engine house

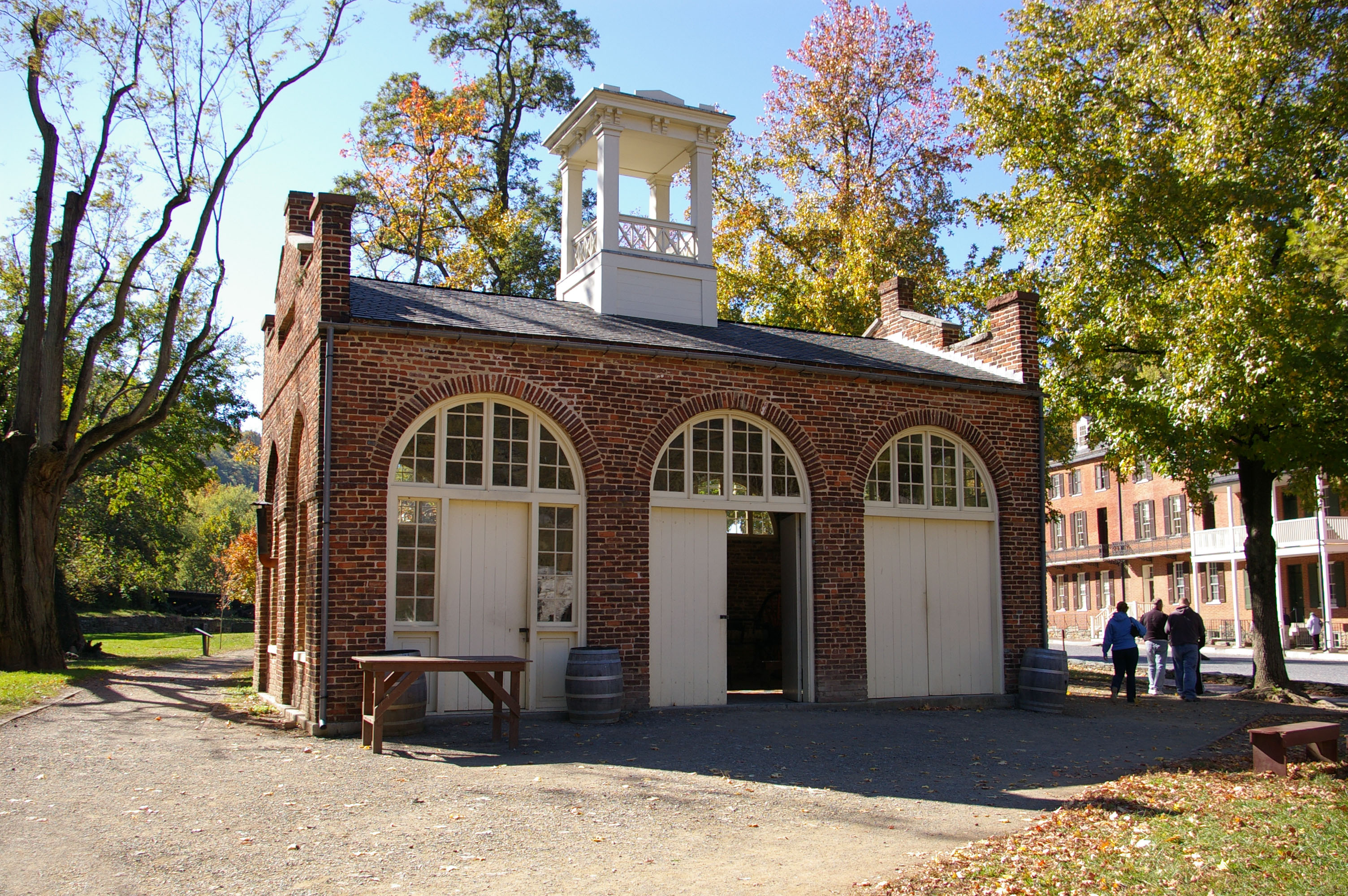
John Brown's Fort today. It is a few hundred feet from its original location, now covered by an embankment.

On Sunday, October 16, 1859, abolitionist John Brown and a group of 21 men captured the federal arsenal at Harpers Ferry, Virginia (since 1863, West Virginia). On orders from President James Buchanan, Secretary of War John B. Floyd asked the Navy Department for a unit of Marines from the Washington Navy Yard, the nearest troops. First Lieutenant Greene was ordered to take a force of 86 Marines to the town. At 3:30 in the afternoon of Monday the 17th, Greene and the Marines proceeded to Harpers Ferry via the Baltimore & Ohio Railroad, they even brought two 12-pounder Dahlgren guns (though they were left on the train and not used). At 10:00 that evening, they were met by Lieutenant Colonel Robert E. Lee, who was the commander of the expedition. The night they surrounded the engine house, where Brown and his followers as well as nine hostages were barricaded.

At 6:30 on the morning of Tuesday, October 18, Lee had Lieutenant J. E. B. Stuart (Lee's aide-de-camp) approach the engine house in an attempt to get Brown to surrender. When that failed, he waved his cap which was the signal for Greene and a detail of 12 Marines to storm the engine house. Two Marines armed with sledgehammers tried in vain to break through the door but were soon forced to retreat. Greene found a ladder in the yard that belonged to the engine house and ordered the other ten Marines to use it as a battering ram to knock the front doors in. Greene was the first through the door and with the assistance of Lewis Washington (a great-grandnephew of George Washington who was being held as a hostage) identified and singled out John Brown. Greene later recounted what happened next:

Quicker than thought I brought my saber down with all my strength upon [Brown's] head. He was moving as the blow fell, and I suppose I did not strike him where I intended, for he received a deep saber cut in the back of the neck. He fell senseless on his side, then rolled over on his back. He had in his hand a short Sharpe's-cavalry carbine. I think he had just fired as I reached Colonel Washington, for the Marine who followed me into the aperture made by the ladder received a bullet in the abdomen, from which he died in a few minutes. The shot might have been fired by some one else in the insurgent party, but I think it was from Brown. Instinctively as Brown fell I gave him a saber thrust in the left breast. The sword I carried was a light uniform weapon, and, either not having a point or striking something hard in Brown's accouterments, did not penetrate. The blade bent double.

The action inside the engine house happened very quickly. In three minutes, the Marines had killed four of John Brown's men as well as freed all of the hostages, who were starving and distraught, but otherwise unhurt. Brown, who was wounded, and his few followers who were still alive were taken prisoner. One Marine was killed in the action and another one was wounded: Private Luke Quinn was killed during the storming of the engine house when he was shot in the abdomen, and Private Matthew Ruppert was shot in the face inside the engine house (possibly by John Brown himself), but fully recovered.

The next day, Greene and a detail of Marines escorted Brown to nearby Charles Town, and turned him over to the civil authorities. Brown was later tried and executed there.

=== Confederate Marine Corps ===
After Virginia declared that it had seceded from the Union, Greene resigned his commission in the U.S. Marine Corps on May 17, 1861. He was one of 16 Marine officers to resign. On July 30, declining an appointment as either a lieutenant colonel in the Virginian infantry or as a colonel in the Wisconsin militia, he joined the newly formed Confederate States Marine Corps where he was given the rank of captain. He would later be promoted to major and was Adjutant and Inspector of the Corps. He served throughout the war at Confederate Marine headquarters in Richmond until his capture and parole at Farmville, Virginia, in April 1865.

== Later life and death ==
After the Civil War, he lived in Clarke County, Virginia, until about 1873. He then moved west and settled in Mitchell, Dakota Territory (now South Dakota) and was a pioneer civil engineer and surveyor. On May 25, 1909, Greene died at the age of 84 on his farm near Mitchell. He is buried in Graceland Cemetery in Mitchell.
