= List of shipwrecks in May 1828 =

The list of shipwrecks in May 1828 includes all ships sunk, foundered, grounded, or otherwise lost during May 1828.

== 6 May ==
List of shipwrecks: 6 May 1828
Ship	State	Description
Herald	(United Kingdom of Great Britain and Ireland) New Zealand	The schooner was wrecked at the entrance to the Hokianga Harbour. The wind suddenly changed direction as she was crossing the bar at the harbour mouth and she was carried onto the rocks. Her crew were rescued.

== 9 May ==
List of shipwrecks: 9 May 1828
Ship	State	Description
Eliza	United Kingdom	The ship was wrecked at Charleston, South Carolina, United States. She was on a voyage from Liverpool, Lancashire to Charleston.
Orpheus	United Kingdom	Lloyd's List reported that the merchant ship had arrived at Dover, England, after running aground on Goodwin Sands in the southern North Sea.

== 10 May ==
List of shipwrecks: 10 May 1828
Ship	State	Description
Edith	United Kingdom	The ship was wrecked near Ringkøbing, Denmark. Her crew were rescued. She was on a voyage from London to Königsberg, Prussia.

== 11 May ==
List of shipwrecks: 11 May 1828
Ship	State	Description
Grampus	(United Kingdom of Great Britain and Ireland) Nevis	The drogher was driven ashore and wrecked on Nevis.
Jane	United Kingdom	The ship foundered in the Gut of Canso. Her crew were rescued.

== 14 May ==
List of shipwrecks: 14 May 1828
Ship	State	Description
Car of Commerce	United States	The steamboat was sunk in the Mississippi River by the explosion of her boiler with the loss of 24 lives. She was on a voyage from New Orleans, Louisiana to Louisville, Kentucky.

== 15 May ==
List of shipwrecks: 15 May 1828
Ship	State	Description
Clydesdale	United Kingdom	The paddle steamer was destroyed by fire off the Corsewall Lighthouse, Dumfriesshire. All on board survived. She was on a voyage from Glasgow, Renfrewshire to Dublin.
George	United Kingdom	The ship was driven ashore and wrecked on Barbados. She was on a voyage from Bristol, Gloucestershire to Saint Vincent.
HMS Parthian	Royal Navy	The Cherokee-class brig-sloop was wrecked near Alexandria, Egypt.

== 16 May ==
List of shipwrecks: 16 May 1828
Ship	State	Description
Union	United Kingdom	The ship was wrecked in the Seine. She was on a voyage from london to Rouen, Seine-Inférieure, France.

== 17 May ==
List of shipwrecks: 17 May 1828
Ship	State	Description
Fanny	United Kingdom	The ship was wrecked on the Corton Sand, in the North Sea off the coast of Suffolk. Her crew were rescued. She was on a voyage from Sunderland, County Durham to London.
Jackall	United Kingdom	The ship sank at Blyth, Northumberland.

== 18 May ==
List of shipwrecks: 18 May 1828
Ship	State	Description
Adeline	United Kingdom	The steamboat ran aground at Sunderland, County Durham. All on board took to the lifeboats. She was on a voyage from Newcastle upon Tyne, Northumberland to Sunderland.
Scotland	United Kingdom	The ship departed from Copiapó, Chile for Bengal, India. No further trace, presumed foundered in the Pacific Ocean with the loss of all hands.

== 19 May ==
List of shipwrecks: 19 May 1828
Ship	State	Description
Janet	United Kingdom	The ship foundered in the Grand Banks of Newfoundland.
Mary	United Kingdom	The ship was wrecked at Antigua.
Meridian	United Kingdom	The ship was wrecked between Simons Bay and Table Bay. Her crew were rescued. She was on a voyage from Batavia, Netherlands East Indies to the Cape of Good Hope.

== 20 May ==
List of shipwrecks: 20 May 1828
Ship	State	Description
St. Charles	United Kingdom	The ship wrecked on Cape Breton Island, Nova Scotia, British North America. Her crew were rescued. She was on a voyage from London to Quebec City, Lower Canada, British North America.

== 22 May ==
List of shipwrecks: 22 May 1828
Ship	State	Description
Echo	United Kingdom	The ship was wrecked on the Boatman's Bank, in the Atlantic Ocean 4 nautical miles (7.4 km) off the West Quoddy Head Lighthouse, Maine, United States. Her crew were rescued. She was on a voyage from Liverpool, Lancashire to Saint John, New Brunswick, British North America.

== 23 May ==
List of shipwrecks: 23 May 1828
Ship	State	Description
Melrose	United Kingdom	The ship was lost in Sable Bay. Her crew were rescued. She was on a voyage from New Orleans, Louisiana to Liverpool, Lancashire.

== 24 May ==
List of shipwrecks: 24 May 1828
Ship	State	Description
North Star	United Kingdom	The ship was wrecked on the Barnard Sand, in the North Sea off the coast of Suffolk with the loss of all hands.

== 25 May ==
List of shipwrecks: 25 May 1828
Ship	State	Description
George and James	United Kingdom	The ship ran aground at Cape St. Antonio, Cuba and was abandoned by her crew.
Marmion	United Kingdom	The ship was driven ashore and wrecked in St. Maces Bay, British North America.
Robert Bruce	United Kingdom	The steamship was driven ashore at Sunderland, County Durham. She was refloated but consequently sank.

== 26 May ==
List of shipwrecks: 26 May 1828
Ship	State	Description
Kitty	United Kingdom	The ship foundered in the Irish Sea off Copeland Island, County Down. Her crew were rescued. She was on a voyage from Glasgow, Renfrewshire to Dublin.

== Unknown date ==
List of shipwrecks: Unknown date in May 1828
Ship	State	Description
Carl Albert	Stettin	The ship was wrecked on the Kentish Knock, in the North Sea off the coast of Kent, United Kingdom. She was on a voyage from Stettin to London, United Kingdom.
Endeavour	United Kingdom	The ship was driven ashore near Skanör, Sweden. Her crew were rescued. She was on a voyage from Liverpool, Lancashire to Libau, Prussia. Endeavour had been refloated by 11 June and was taken in to Copenhagen, Denmark for repairs.
Enterprise	(United Kingdom of Great Britain and Ireland) New South Wales	The schooner was en route from Sydney to Hokianga in New Zealand. wrecked while sailing too close to shore just north of the entrance to Hokianga Harbour on or around May 3. Some reports suggest the crew had mistaken a bay ar Whangape for the entrance to the Hokianga Harbour. All crew survived the wreck, but were captured and killed by local Māori.
Guabin	United Kingdom	The ship foundered before 23 May. Her crew were rescued by Nicholson (United Kingdom). She was on a voyage from Africa to London.
Spencer	United Kingdom	The brig foundered. Her crew were rescued.
Union	United Kingdom	The ship was wrecked on the Banc du Tot, in the English Channel. She was on a voyage from Newcastle upon Tyne, Northumberland to Rouen, Seine-Inférieure, France.
Union	United Kingdom	The ship foundered in the Atlantic Ocean. Her crew were rescued. She was on a voyage from Aberdeen to the St. Lawrence River.
