= Lewis Washington =

American planter and slaveowner

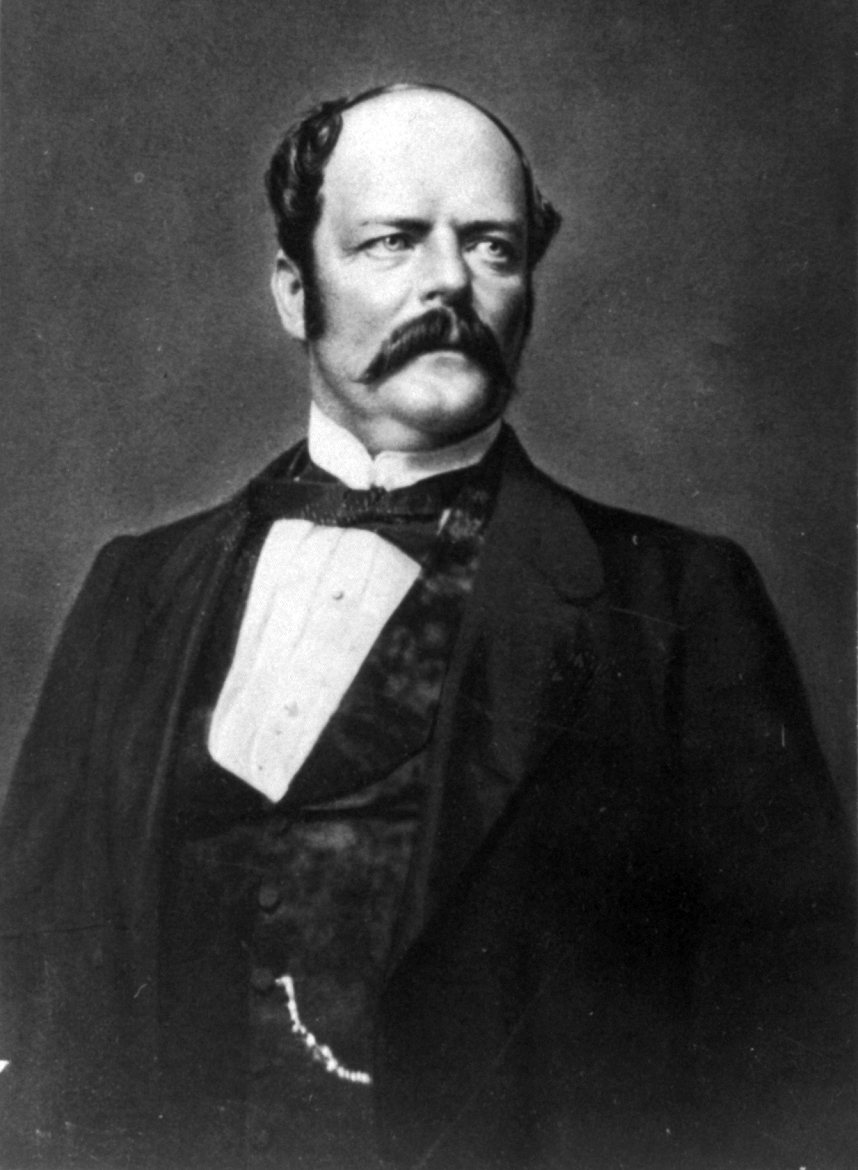
- Born: November 30, 1812
- Died: October 1, 1871 (aged 58)
- Parent(s): George Corbin Washington; Elizabeth Beall
- Relatives: George Washington (great-granduncle); William Augustine Washington (grandfather); Augustine Washington (great-grandfather)

Lewis William Washington (November 30, 1812 – October 1, 1871) was a great-grandnephew of President George Washington. He is most remembered today for his involuntary participation in John Brown's raid on Harpers Ferry, Virginia, in 1859. He was taken as hostage and some of his slaves were briefly freed. (See Black participation in John Brown's Raid.) As he outranked the other hostages, he was their unofficial spokesperson and testified in both Brown's subsequent trial and before the Senate committee investigating the raid.

Lewis Washington was the son of George Corbin Washington, the grandson of William Augustine Washington, and a great-grandson of Augustine Washington, half-brother of George Washington. Lewis Washington inherited Beall-Air, near Harper's Ferry, Virginia (since 1863, West Virginia), through his mother, Elizabeth, daughter of Thomas Beall (from which the estate's name originates). He made his home at Beall-Air from 1840 until his death in 1871. The mansion survives and is currently used for wedding receptions and the like.

== The Harper's Ferry Raid ==
Lewis William Washington inherited several relics of George Washington, including a sword allegedly given by Frederick the Great to Washington and a pair of pistols given by Lafayette. John Cook, who served as John Brown's advance party at Harpers Ferry, befriended Washington and noted the relics, as well as the slave population at Beall-Air. Brown was fascinated with the Washington relics. During Brown's October 16, 1859 raid on Harpers Ferry a detachment from his force led by Cook seized the sword and pistols along with Washington at Beall-Air, taking along three of Washington's slaves. The hostages were taken to Harpers Ferry by way of the Allstadt House and Ordinary, where more hostages were taken. Ultimately, Washington and the others were held at Brown's base in the fire engine house of the Harpers Ferry federal arsenal. All survived their captivity, and Washington identified Brown to the Marine rescue party. During the assault on John Brown's Fort, a saber thrust by Marine Lieutenant Green at Brown was allegedly deflected by the belt buckle securing the Washington sword.

== Aftermath ==
During John Brown's trial for treason against the Commonwealth of Virginia, Lewis Washington testified as a witness for the prosecution. During cross-examination, Washington testified that Brown treated his hostages well and gave orders not to harm civilians.

When the Civil War began, Washington sided with the Confederacy. On July 17, 1865, he was pardoned by President Andrew Johnson. Washington was interred at Zion Episcopal Church in Charles Town. Many pieces from Lewis Washington's collection of Washington family items, including the sword given him by Frederick the Great and the Lafayette pistols, were donated to the New York State Library by his widow in 1872. Lewis Washington married twice, first to Mary Ann Barroll and then to Ella Bassett. He was survived by two sons and two daughters, James Barroll Washington, who served in the Confederate army, Mary Ann Washington (married to Henry Irving Keyser), Eliza Ridgeley Washington (married Elias Glenn Perine), and William De Hertbrun Washington. William De Hertbrun Washington died without issue on August 30, 1914. James Barroll Washington was survived by one son, William Lanier Washington who died without surviving children on September 11, 1933, after selling the remainder of his family collection of Washington heirlooms at public auction on April 19, 1917.

Children of Lewis William Washington and Mary Ann Barroll:

1. George Corbin Washington (1837–1843)
2. James Barroll Washington (1839–1899)
3. Mary Ann Washington (1841–1931)
4. Eliza Ridgeley Washington (1844–1919)

Children of Lewis William Washington and Ella Bassett:

1. Betty Lewis Washington (1861–1862)
2. William De Hertbrun Washington (1863–1914)

== See also ==
- List of kidnappings
