= Echo (slave ship) =

Echo may refer to the following slave ships:

- Echo (1790 ship)
- Echo (1845 ship)
