= Echo (1845 ship) =

Captured 1858 with illegal slave cargo

Echo was a sail-powered ship launched at Baltimore, Maryland and registered at New Orleans. On 8 February 1858, she sailed to Loango where she embarked 450–455 captives. USS Dolphin captured her on 21 August at a small island off Cuba and took her into Charleston, South Carolina where she was condemned and her captain and crew tried for piracy. On the Middle Passage between Africa and Cuba 141 captives died; she arrived at Charleston with 306. According to Frederic Bancroft in Slave Trading in the Old South, the crew was acquitted by a Charleston jury on charges of violating the law prohibiting the importation of slaves.

United States law required the return of the Africans to Monrovia, Liberia. USS Niagara carried 271 surviving captives to Liberia where 200 arrived.
