= Allstadt House and Ordinary =

Historic house in West Virginia, United States

- U.S. National Register of Historic Places
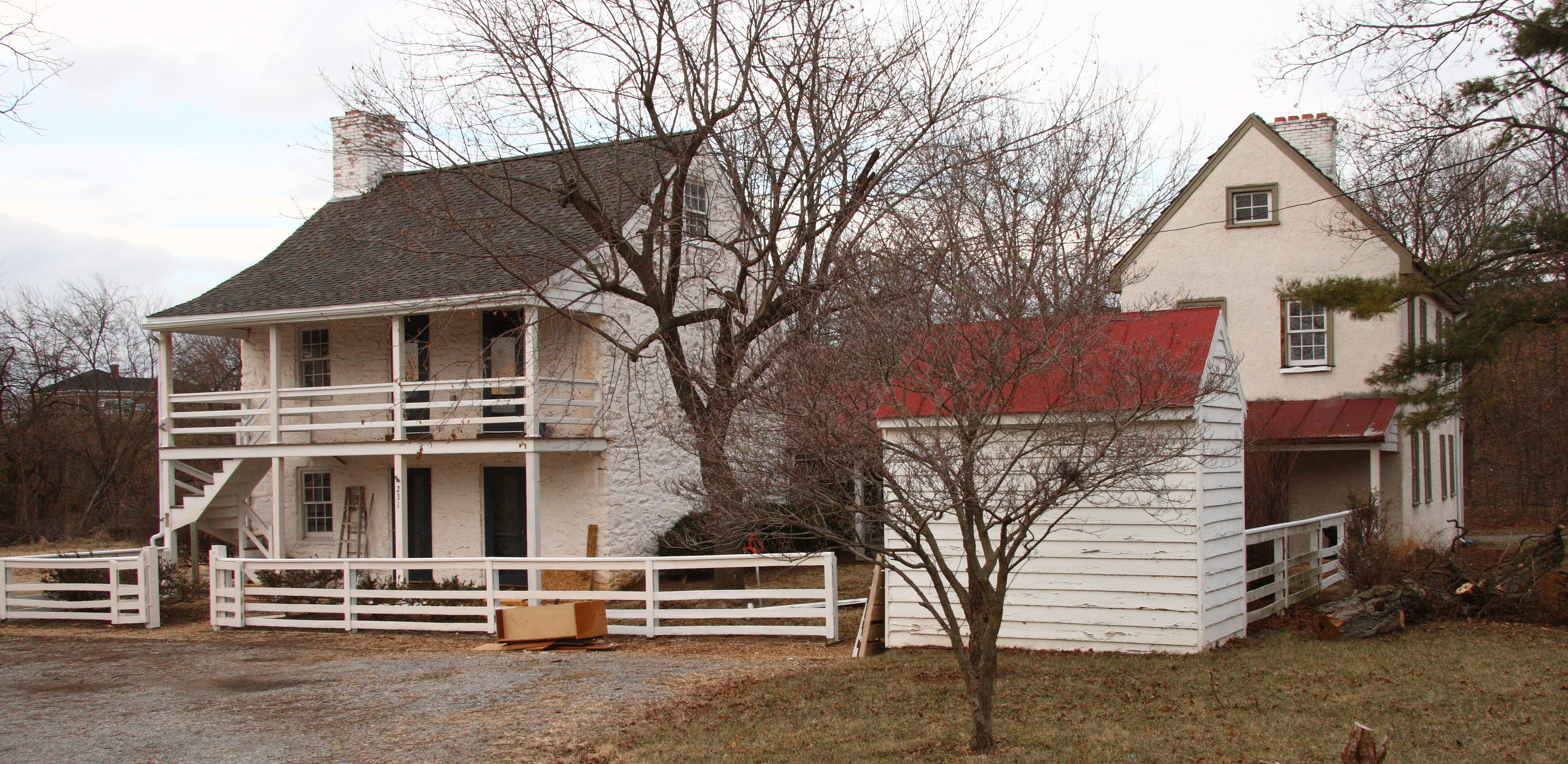
- Allstadt House and Ordinary, January 2009

- Location within West Virginia Location within the United States
- Location: Junction of U.S. Route 340 and County Road 27, near Harper's Ferry, West Virginia
- Coordinates: 39°18′58.53″N 77°45′20.46″W
- Built: 1790
- Architect: Jacob Allstadt
- NRHP reference No.: 85000767
- Added to NRHP: April 9, 1985

The Allstadt House and Ordinary was built about 1790 on land owned by the Lee family near Harpers Ferry, West Virginia, including Phillip Ludwell Lee, Richard Bland Lee and Henry Lee III. The house at the crossroads was sold to the Jacob Allstadt family of Berks County, Pennsylvania in 1811. Allstadt operated an ordinary (a tavern) in the house, and a tollgate on the Harpers Ferry-Charles Town Turnpike, while he resided farther down the road in a stone house. The house was enlarged by the Allstadts c. 1830. The house remained in the family until the death of John Thomas Allstadt in 1923, the last survivor of John Brown's Raid.

The property was placed on the National Register of Historic Places in 1985.

It was purchased by the American Battlefield Trust, which in 2019 donated it to the Harpers Ferry National Historical Park.

== John Brown's raid ==
The house's chief historic significance came in 1859, when John Brown launched his raid on Harpers Ferry. Brown ordered a detachment of his forces under John Cook to go to Beall-Air and take hostage the owner, Colonel Lewis Washington, and free his slaves. On their return to Harpers Ferry with Washington, the party stopped at Allstadt's and took Allstadt and his son John Thomas, and freed seven slaves. All survived the siege, and the slaves were later re-enslaved. Virginia Governor Henry A. Wise and others who were pro-slavery claimed that these "contented" slaves were forced to leave their owners, and returned to them as soon as they could. To avoid whipping or execution, the slaves all said the same thing: they had been forcibly taken by Brown.

== Description ==
The property comprises a small complex of buildings. The main Allstadt House (c. 1790) is a two-story L-shaped structure with a central brick chimney, built of nogging; stuccoed brick between timber uprights. The present structure was expanded from a 1 1/2-story house c. 1830. The original interior comprises only two rooms on the ground floor, each with Georgian period mantels. The upstairs portion comprises two rooms and a hall., with one fireplace. Windows are 6-over-6 double-hung sashes. A one-story kitchen was originally a separate building, now attached by a connecting room, probably at the time the second floor was added. A porch was added on the east side c. 1930, since removed.

A separate two-story stone building was built c. 1830, with a two-tiered porch on the south side leading to two rooms on each level. The attic is a finished, plastered room, accessible by a ladder.

A nearby stone bank barn also dates to the 1830 period. The barn was used as a stable for the tavern's customers. The barn's overhang is supported by unusual chamfered stone piers.

The Allstadt Cemetery is also nearby, serving as the central burial place for the extended family. Graves span the period 1821 to 1880, including the grave of five Russell family infants who may have died of diphtheria.
