= USS Niagara (1855) =

Gunboat of the United States Navy

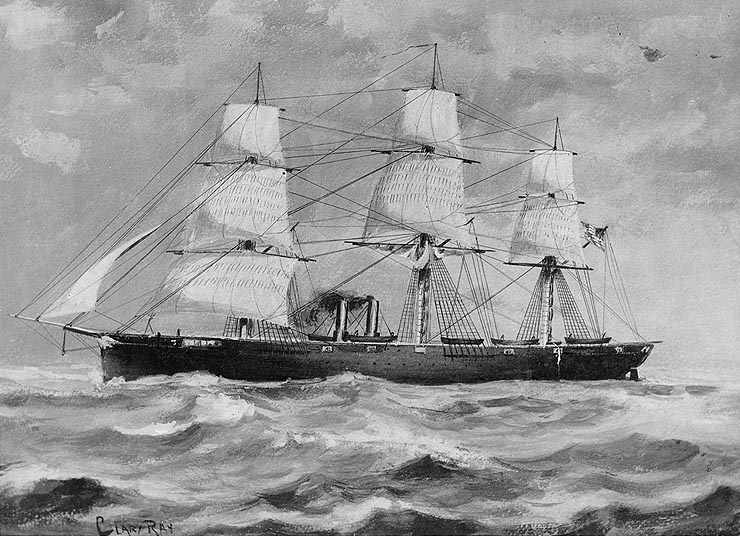
- Niagara

History

United States
- Name: USS Niagara
- Builder: New York Navy Yard, Brooklyn, New York
- Launched: 23 February 1855
- Commissioned: 6 April 1857
- Decommissioned: 2 December 1857
- Recommissioned: 24 February 1858
- Decommissioned: 17 December 1858
- Recommissioned: 14 May 1860
- Decommissioned: 16 June 1862
- Recommissioned: 14 October 1863
- Decommissioned: 28 September 1865
- Fate: Sold 6 May 1885

General characteristics
- Type: Steam frigate
- Displacement: 5,540 long tons (5,629 t)
- Length: 328 ft 10 in (100.23 m)
- Beam: 55 ft 4 in (16.87 m)
- Draft: 24 ft 5 in (7.44 m)
- Propulsion: Sails / Steam engine
- Complement: 251
- Armament: 12 × 11 in (280 mm) Dahlgren smoothbore guns

The second USS Niagara was a screw frigate in the United States Navy.

Niagara was launched by New York Navy Yard on 23 February 1855; sponsored by Miss Annie C. O'Donnell; and commissioned on 6 April 1857, with Captain William L. Hudson in command.

== Service history ==
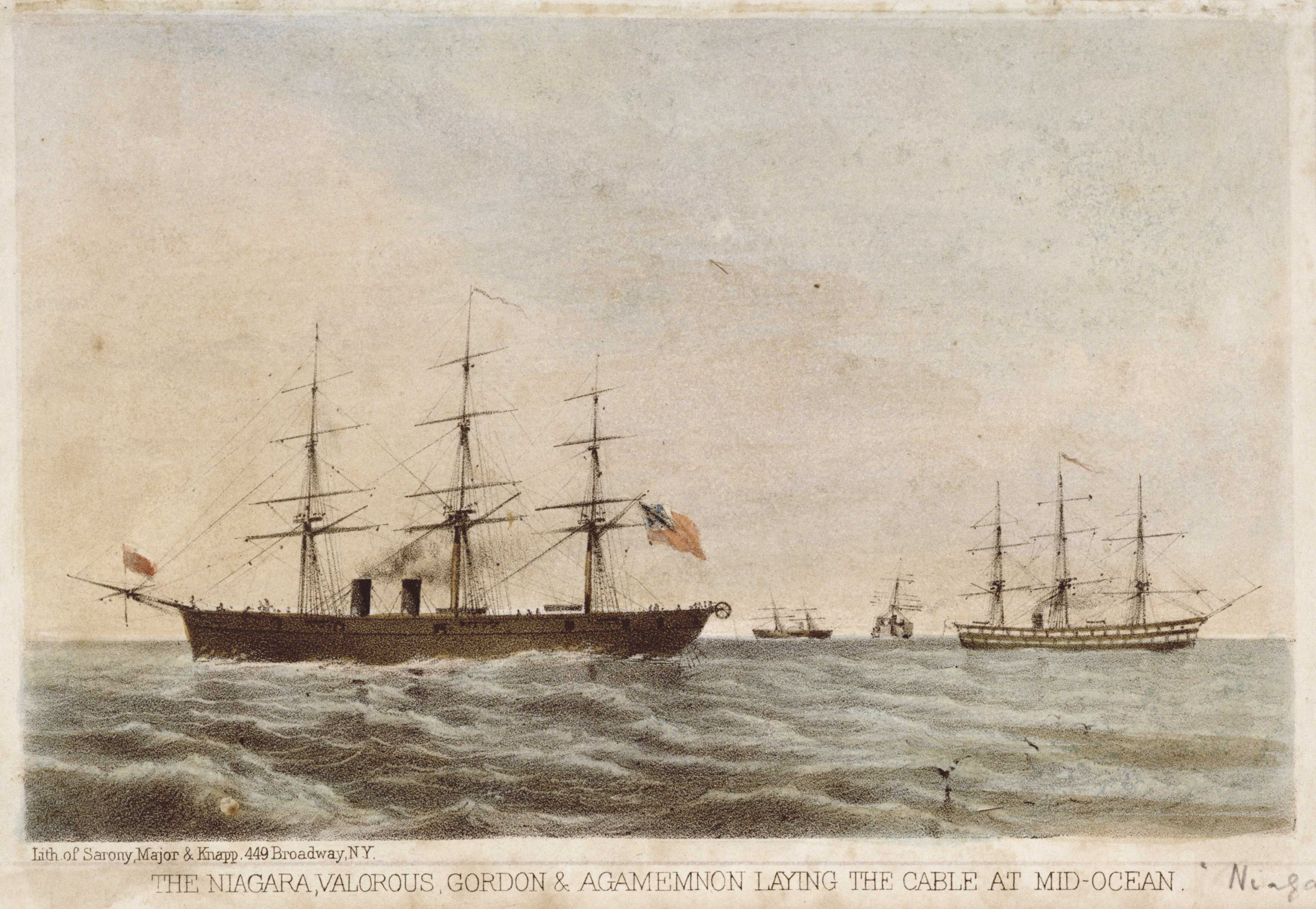
The Niagara, HMS Valorous, HMS Gorgon and Agamemnon laying the cable at mid-ocean

=== Transatlantic telegraph cable, 1857–1858 ===
Niagara sailed from New York on 22 April 1857 for England, arriving at Gravesend on 14 May. A log of the ship's voyage across the Atlantic was kept by the correspondent of the New York Daily Times, where it was published on Thursday, 14 May 1857. On arrival in England, Niagara was equipped to lay cable for the first transatlantic telegraph, which was to follow the shallow tableland discovered between Newfoundland and Ireland by Matthew F. Maury. By 11 August, when a break in the cable defied recovery, she had laid several hundred miles westward from Valentia Island, Ireland. She returned to New York 20 November and was decommissioned on 2 December to prepare for a second essay at cable-laying. Recommissioning on 24 February 1858, with Captain William L. Hudson in command, she sailed on 8 March, arrived at Plymouth, England, on 28 March, and experimented with HMS Agamemnon. The ships returned to Plymouth to fit out, then made a mid-ocean rendezvous on 29 July, spliced their cable ends and each sailed toward her own continent. On 5 August, Niagara's boats carried the end of the cable ashore at Bay Bulls Arm, Newfoundland, and the same day Agamemnon landed her end of the cable. The first message flashed across 16 August, when Queen Victoria sent a cable to President James Buchanan. This first cable operated for three weeks; ultimate success was only to come in 1866.

=== Voyage to Africa, 1858 ===
During the summer of 1858, the U.S. Navy experienced increased pressure to interdict slave traffic in the Caribbean Sea. On 21 August, the USS Dolphin captured the slave ship Echo off Cuba with men, women, and children taken from Kabenda, Guinea. There were originally 450 to 470 Africans, but that number had dwindled to 306 when they arrived at Castle Pinckney, Charleston, South Carolina. Congressional law required the return of the Africans to Monrovia, Liberia and the huge size of the Niagara made her well suited for returning them. On 20 September, Captain John S. Chauncey boarded 271 Africans who were suffering terribly from scurvy and dysentery. Chauncey expected to reach Africa in twenty days, but that changed when a heavy northwest wind took the Niagara way off course. Seventy-one Africans died before he reached Monrovia on 9 November. Captain Chauncey sent 200 survivors ashore and arrived back in New York Harbor on 11 December. Six days later, the Niagara was decommissioned.

=== Voyage to Japan, 1860–1861 ===
Niagara recommissioned on 14 May 1860, Captain William McKean in command. Another unique assignment awaited; she was to carry Japan's first diplomatic mission to the United States from Washington to New York, and then home. Leaving New York on 30 June, Niagara called in Porto Grande, Cape Verde Islands; São Paulo-de-Loande (now Luanda), Angola; Batavia (now Djakarta), Java; and Hong Kong . The frigate entered Tokyo Bay on 8 November to land her distinguished passengers, then sailed on 27 November for Hong Kong, Aden, and Cape Town, returning Boston on 23 April 1861 to learn of the outbreak of the Civil War. The cruise of the Niagara.

=== Civil War, 1861–1865 ===
Quickly preparing for duty on the blockade of southern ports, USS Niagara arrived off Charleston, South Carolina on 10 May, and two days later captured blockade runner General Parkhill attempting to make Charleston from Liverpool. Through the summer she gave similar service at Mobile Bay, and was at Fort Pickens, Florida on 22 September when Flag Officer William McKean in Niagara took command of the East Gulf Blockading Squadron. She engaged Confederate defenses at Fort McRee, Pensacola, and Warrington on 22 November, and was hulled twice above the waterline. On 5 June 1862 she sailed for repairs at Boston Navy Yard, where she decommissioned 16 June. Recommissioned 14 October 1863, Niagara steamed from New York on 1 June 1864 to watch over Confederate warships then fitting out in Europe. She reached her base at Antwerp on 26 June, and from there roved the English Channel, the French Atlantic Coast and the Bay of Biscay. On 15 August she took steamer Georgia, a former Confederate warship, off Portugal. In February and March, with USS Sacramento she lay at Ferrol, Spain, to prevent Confederate ironclad Stonewall from departing, but the much more powerful southern ship was able to make good her escape. William B. Gould served on board the Niagara.

Niagara patrolled with the European Squadron until 29 August when she cleared Cádiz for Boston, arriving on 20 September. There she decommissioned on 28 September 1865, remaining in the Boston Navy Yard until sold on 6 May 1885.

== See also ==
- Blockade runners of the American Civil War
- Confederate States Navy
- List of steam frigates of the United States Navy
- Union blockade
- Union Navy

== Bibliography ==
- Bostick, Douglas W. (2010). Charleston Under Siege: The Impregnable City.
  The History Press, Charleston, South Carolina. p. 158. ISBN 9781596297579. Url
