= USS Dolphin (1836) =

Brig in the United States Navy

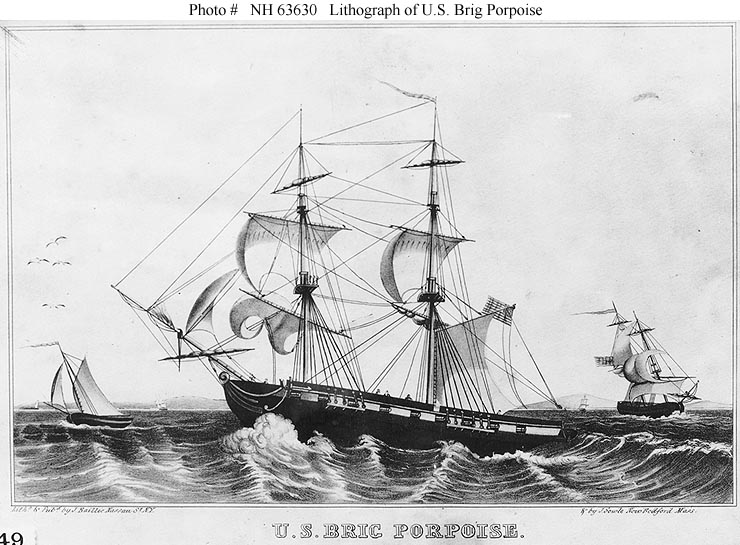
- Dolphin's sister ship Porpoise

History

United States
- Name: USS Dolphin
- Builder: New York Navy Yard
- Launched: 17 June 1836
- Commissioned: 6 September 1836
- Fate: Burned to prevent capture, 21 April 1861

General characteristics
- Type: Brig
- Displacement: 224 long tons (228 t)
- Length: 88 ft (27 m)
- Beam: 25 ft (7.6 m)
- Draft: 13 ft (4.0 m)
- Propulsion: Sail
- Speed: 17 kn (20 mph; 31 km/h)
- Complement: 80 officers and enlisted
- Armament: 2 × 9-pounder guns, 8 × 24-pounder carronades

The third USS Dolphin was the brig in the United States Navy. Her plans were the basis of other brigs of that time. She was named for the aquatic mammal.

== Service history ==
She was launched on 17 June 1836 at New York Navy Yard, and commissioned on 6 September 1836. She sailed on 6 October under the command of Lieutenant W. E. McKenney to join the Brazil Squadron after a short cruise on the coast of Africa. She joined her squadron on 21 February 1837, and was employed in the waters along the Atlantic coast of South America to protect the rights and property of American citizens. She set sail from Bahia, Brazil on 17 April 1839, and arrived at New York City on 16 May, where she was decommissioned on 25 May.

Dolphin made two cruises off the coast of Africa to suppress the slave trade from 18 December 1839 to 14 July 1840, and again from 5 November 1840 to 25 May 1841. On 7 September, she sailed to join the newly organized Home Squadron cruising on the Atlantic coast and in the West Indies. Aside from a repair period at New York from 31 December 1841 to 4 March 1842, she served with the Home Squadron until October 1843.

Dolphin lay at Norfolk, Virginia until 13 November 1845, when she sailed to join the African Squadron, returning to New York on 5 November 1847. She got underway on 6 May 1848 to join the East India Squadron, protecting American citizens in Asiatic waters. She called at the Island of Mauritius in the Indian Ocean to repair damage suffered during a gale and arrived at Whampoa, China in February 1849. Dolphin cruised in Chinese waters until 22 July 1850, when she sailed for New York by way of the California coast and Cape Horn, arriving on 24 June 1851.

Out of commission at New York until 10 September 1852, Dolphin put to sea on 30 September on a special cruise to test and perfect discoveries made by Lieutenant M. F. Maury in his investigation of the winds and currents of the ocean, sailing as far as the English Channel. She arrived at Hampton Roads on 12 November 1853, then returned to New York, where she was placed in ordinary during 1854.

Recommissioned at Norfolk on 23 April 1855, Dolphin put to sea on 8 May for another African cruise. She arrived on station 16 June and patrolled to suppress the slave trade until 28 June 1857, when she stood out for the United States, arriving at Boston, Massachusetts on 21 July. She went out of commission on 27 July.

Placed back in commission she cruised in the West Indies to intercept slave ships between June and September 1858. On 21 August she captured the slave ship Echo with 318 Africans on board and sent her into Charleston, South Carolina. Those thus saved from slavery were later sent back to Africa on the USS Niagara.

Dolphin sailed from Boston on 16 October 1858 for duty on the Brazil Station, taking part in the Paraguay expedition to obtain redress for Paraguay's unprovoked firing upon the American ship Water Witch and to settle diplomatic difficulties from December 1858 to February 1859. Dolphin returned to Norfolk on 22 December 1860 and was laid up at the Navy Yard. She was burned there on 21 April 1861 by Union forces to prevent her from falling into Confederate hands.
