= Echo (1792 ship) =

History

Great Britain
- Name: Echo
- Namesake: Echo (mythology)
- Owner: Staniforth
- Builder: Hull
- Launched: 1792
- Fate: Captured 1799

General characteristics
- Tons burthen: 297, or 298, or 299, or 2997/94 (bm)
- Length: 98 ft 8 in (30.1 m) (overall); 78 ft 4 in (23.9 m) (keel)
- Beam: 26 ft 9 1/2 in (8.2 m)
- Depth of hold: 11 ft 9 in (3.6 m)
- Propulsion: Sail
- Complement: 25
- Armament: 8 × 12&4-pounder guns
- Notes: Three decks

Echo was launched at Hull in 1792. She originally sailed to Greenland and Saint Petersburg. Then between 1794 and 1795 she made one voyage for the British East India Company (EIC). In 1799 a French privateer captured her.

== Career ==
Echo enters Lloyd's Register in 1792 with W. Catlin, master, Staniforth, owner, and trade Hull—Davis Strait. She next sailed between Hull and Saint Petersburg.

EIC voyage (1794–1795): In 1794 the EIC chartered Echo for one voyage. First though, they had Young, of Rotherhithe, measure her. Then Captain William Catline acquired a letter of marque on 15 May 1794. He sailed her from Portsmouth on 23 June, bound for Calcutta and Madras. Echo arrived at Calcutta on 24 December. Homeward bound, she was at Saugor on 1 February 1795, Madras on 4 March, and Saint Helena on 24 May. She arrived back at Long Reach on 17 August.

The data below is from Lloyd's Register. Some of this data may represent voyages by Echo for the EIC but for which logbooks did not end up in EIC storage. (Until 1814 British ships were legally forbidden to sail east of the Cape of Good Hope unless sailing for the EIC or with a special dispensation from it.)

Year	Master	Owner	Trade
1796	Catlin	Staniforth	London—Bengal
1797	Catlin	Staniforth	London—Bengal
1798	Catlin	Staniforth	London—India
1799	Catlin	Staniforth	London—India

The ship arrivals and departure (SAD) data from Lloyd's List (LL) of 4 July 1797, showed Echo, Caitline, master, to have arrived at Bengal, but without specifying a date.

== Fate ==
On 3 February 1799 the French privateer Confiance captured Echo as Echo was sailing from the Cape of Good Hope for London. Confiance sent Echo into France.

LL for 12 August 1800, in its SAD data, reported that Echo, Caitline, master, was at Murmansk, having come from London. However, the Echo of this SAD item was a new vessel, launched at Hull, and also owned by Staniforth.
