= Beall-Air =

Historic house in West Virginia, United States

- U.S. National Register of Historic Places
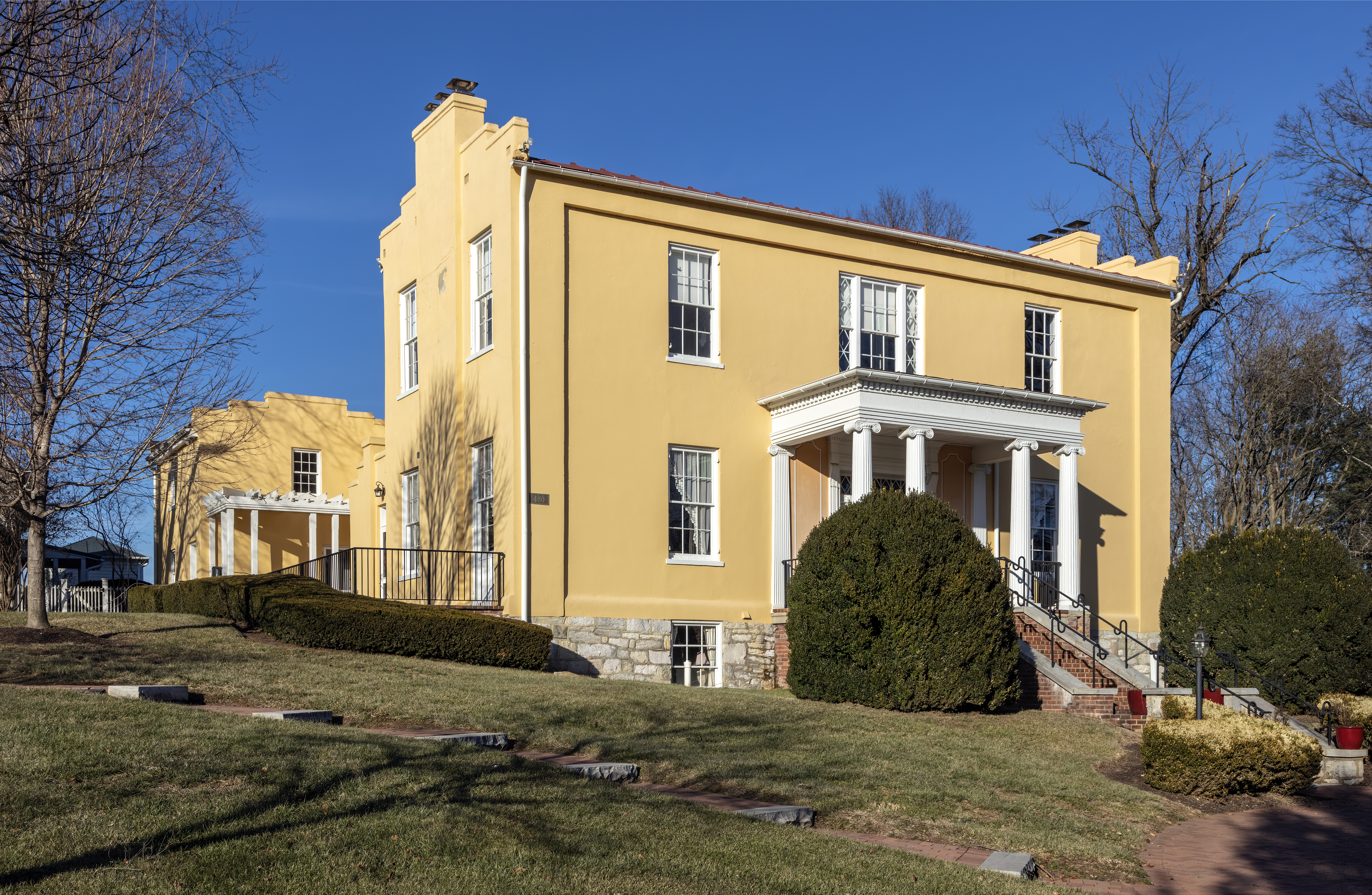
- Beall-Air in 2022

- Location within West Virginia Location within the United States
- Nearest city: Halltown, West Virginia
- Coordinates: 39°18′55″N 77°48′44″W
- Built: 1820
- NRHP reference No.: 73001914
- Added to NRHP: August 17, 1973

Beall-Air, also known as the Colonel Lewis William Washington House, is a two-story stuccoed brick house in classical revival style near Halltown, West Virginia. It was the home of Colonel Lewis William Washington, great-great nephew of President George Washington and hostage in John Brown's raid on Harpers Ferry, West Virginia.

The original house, now the rear portion of the house, is believed to have been built by Thomas Beall prior to 1800. Beall's daughter Elizabeth married George Corbin Washington in 1807. George Corbin was the grandson of Augustine Washington, half-brother of George Washington. The present front of the house was added in 1820.

== Description ==
The main (1820) portion of the house is a two-story stucco-faced brick structure on a stone foundation. The corners of the three-bay house are thickened by pilasters, with a similar frieze-like thickening extending horizontally above the second floor windows. The front, or south elevation has a small portico with a flat roof and four Ionic columns. The front door has sidelights and an overlight, echoed by the second floor window immediately above the portico. The east and west ends have stepped gables with central chimneys and the "shadow" of a porch. A small 2½ story structure to the north of the main house connects to the main house with a two-story link. This structure has a gabled roof with dormers and is also stuccoed. Its windows are late 18th century in detail.

== The Harpers Ferry Raid ==
Lewis William inherited several relics of George Washington, including a sword allegedly given by Frederick the Great to Washington and a pair of pistols given by Lafayette. John Cook, who served as John Brown's advance party at Harpers Ferry, befriended Washington and noted the relics, as well as the slave population at Beall-Air. Brown was fascinated with the Washington relics. During Brown's raid on Harpers Ferry a detachment from his force led by Cook seized the sword and pistols along with Washington at Beall-Air, taking along three of Washington's slaves. The hostages were taken to Harpers Ferry by way of the Allstadt House and Ordinary, where more hostages were taken. All survived their captivity, and Washington identified Brown to the Marine rescue party. During the assault on John Brown's Fort, a saber thrust by Marine Lieutenant Green at Brown was allegedly deflected by the belt buckle securing the Washington sword.
