= Echo (1799 ship) =

British merchant ship (1799–1828)

History

Great Britain
- Name: Echo
- Builder: Thomas Steemson, Thorne, Hull
- Launched: 19 October 1799
- Fate: Wrecked 22 May 1828

General characteristics
- Tons burthen: 418, or 429 (bm)
- Armament: 1800: 2 × 9-pounder guns; 1801: 6 × 12-pounder guns + 8 × 12-pounder carronades; 1804: 10 × 9-pounder guns; 1805: 10 × 6-pounder guns

Echo was a ship launched at Kingston upon Hull in 1799. She quickly became a West Indiaman, sailing between Britain and Jamaica under a number of owners and masters. In 1826–1828 she made one voyage to Bengal, sailing under a licence from the British East India Company (EIC). On her return to Liverpool, she immediately sailed for Canada, and was lost on 22 May 1828 near Lubec, Maine.

== Career ==
Echo first appeared in Lloyd's Register (LR), in 1800.

Year	Master	Owner	Trade	Source & notes
1800	W.Catlin (Note: Captain Catline had been master of another Echo, also launched at Hull and owned by Staniforth, that a French privateer had captured earlier in 1799.); J.Norrill	Staniforth	London–Archangel; London–Jamaica	LR
1801	J.Norrie	Lyons & Co.	London–Archangel; London–Jamaica	LR
1805	J.Russell; William Wilson	Brown & Co. Lyon & Co.	London–Jamaica	LR
1808	Smith; Shaw	Shaw & Co.	London–Jamaica	LR; small repairs 1807
1809	Shaw; Smart	Shaw & Co.	London–Jamaica	LR; small repairs 1807
1812	Smart; H.Linder	Shaw & Co.	London–Jamaica	LR; small repairs 1807
1821	H.Linder	Shaw & Co.	London–Jamaica	LR; small repairs 1807 & 1821
1823	H.Linder; Rutland; Dunlap	Shaw & Co. Meaburn & Co.	London–Jamaica	LR; small repairs 1821
1824	Dunlap	Meaburn & Co.	London–Cape of Good Hope (CGH)	LR; small repairs 1821; wants repair
1826	Dunlap; Thompson	Meaburn & Co.	London–Cape of Good Hope (CGH)	LR; small repairs 1821 & good repair 1826
1827	Thompson	Meaburn & Co.	London–Calcutta	LR; small repairs 1821 & good repair 1826

In 1813 the EIC had lost its monopoly on the trade between India and Britain. British ships were then free to sail to India or the Indian Ocean under a licence from the EIC.

Captain Thompson sailed from London on 28 October 1826 under a licence from the EIC, bound for Bengal. Echo arrived at Bengal on 15 May 1827.

Homeward bound, she sailed from Saugor Roads on 8 November. She sailed from St Helena on 12 January 1828, and arrived at Liverpool on 27 February 1828.

Year	Master	Owner	Trade	Source & notes
1828	Thompson; Mine	Meaburn & Co.	London–Calcutta	LR; small repairs 1821 & good repair 1826

On 19 April 1828, Echo, Milne, master, sailed from Liverpool for Saint John, New Brunswick.

== Fate ==
A letter from Lubec, Maine dated 24 May 1828, reported that Echo Milne, master, had wrecked on 22 May on the Boatman's Bank about 4 nautical miles (7.4 km) west of the West Quoddy Head Lighthouse. Her crew and part of her cargo were saved.

Echo was no longer listed in the issues for 1829 of Lloyd's Register, or the Register of Shipping.
