= Affliction =

Affliction or Afflicted may refer to:

== Books ==
- Affliction (novel), a 2013 Anita Blake: Vampire Hunter novel by Laurell K. Hamilton
- Affliction, a novel by Russell Banks, basis of the 1998 film

== Film and TV ==
- Affliction (1997 film), a 1997 American drama by Paul Schrader
- Affliction (1996 film), a 1996 American documentary film
- Affliction (2021 film), a 2021 Indonesian horror film
- "Affliction" (Star Trek: Enterprise), an episode of Star Trek: Enterprise
- Afflictions: Culture & Mental Illness in Indonesia, a 2010–2011 ethnographic documentary film series
- The Afflicted (film), a 2011 American horror film by Jason Stoddard
- Afflicted (film), a 2013 Canadian horror film by Derek Lee and Clif Prowse
- Afflicted (TV series), a 2018 Netflix documentary series

== Brands ==
- Affliction Clothing, an American clothing manufacturer and retailer
  - Affliction Entertainment, a defunct mixed martial arts promotion company created by Affliction Clothing

== Music ==
- Afflicted (band), a Swedish technical death metal band
- Affliction (album), a 1996 album by Econoline Crush

== See also ==
- Disease
- Suffering
