= Cloudsplitter =

1998 novel by Russell Banks

- First edition
- Author: Russell Banks
- Cover artist: Marc Cohen
- Language: English
- Genre: Historical novel
- Publisher: Harper Flamingo
- Publication date: March 1998
- Publication place: United States
- Media type: Print (hard & paperback)
- Pages: 768 pp (first edition, hardcover)
- ISBN: 0-06-016860-9 (first edition, hardcover)
- OCLC: 37024178
- Dewey Decimal: 813/.54 21
- LC Class: PS3552.A49 C57 1998
- Preceded by: Rule of the Bone
- Followed by: Invisible Stranger

Cloudsplitter is a 1998 historical novel by Russell Banks relating the story of abolitionist John Brown.

The novel is narrated as a retrospective by John Brown's son, Owen Brown, from his hermitage in the San Gabriel Mountains of California. His reminiscences are triggered by the reception of an invitation from a Miss Mayo, assistant to Oswald Garrison Villard, then researching his book John Brown: A Biography Fifty Years After (Boston, 1910).

The title of the book comes from a translation of the Iroquois word Tahawus, the name of the mountain—English name Mount Marcy—just beyond the Brown family estate. It is the highest mountain in New York State.

Until his death on January 7, 2023, Banks had lived for years in Keene, New York, near John Brown's Farm in North Elba, New York.

== Plot ==
In 1899 Owen Brown, who has spent roughly the past 30 years living in isolation, receives a visit from Miss Mayo, a young woman assisting in the research on a book on his father, John Brown. While Owen initially chases her off he changes his mind and decides to write her a series of letters about his experiences fighting for the abolition of slavery with his father.

Brown recounts his early life growing up under his father's guidance, a time which is marked by hardship and loss. Owen loses his mother at an early age. Despite the fact that his father is extremely devout he chooses atheism, much to his father's displeasure. At a young age, while defying his father's demand that the children reflect on Sunday, Brown falls from the roof of the family home and breaks his arm, wounding himself and developing a permanent disability as a result. When he is a teenager his father loses everything he owns, condemning the family to a life of instability and poverty. A few years later when the youngest child among them, Kitty, is about a year old, she dies from severe burns caused by water spilled by Ruth, Owen's teenage sister. When he is 24, shortly before the family moves to North Elba, Owen solicits a prostitute the same evening as his baby sister, Ellen, dies. His father is beside himself and Owen believes that both the death and his father's grief are caused by his sin. He repents and becomes fully devoted to his father and his causes.

The family moves to North Elba where John Brown has been given the opportunity to purchase prime farming land for a low price in exchange for helping to acclimate the families of Timbuctoo, mostly free black city folk, to a life of farming. To his shame Owen once again craves a life independent of his father and struggles to feel at home around black people feeling through his acquaintanceship with them a deep guilt over the legacy of slavery. Pressured to stay he begins to help his father with surveying work and additionally developing their homestead as a way station on the Underground Railroad accompanied by two black residents of Timbuctoo: Lyman Epps and Eldon Fleete. While most of the Brown's white neighbours are passively anti-slavery their minds change after Brown helps to free Samuel and Susan Cannon, a young couple who allegedly murdered their white owner. Epps and Fleete are eventually arrested on suspicion of having aided the Cannons and John Brown along with Owen and his two elder brothers forcibly rescue them from prison. In the ensuing battle Fleete is shot and killed while two white men, a bounty hunter and a jailer, are injured by the Browns. John Brown later learns the Cannons never made it to Canada. Dejected by this news and Fleete's death he decides to take Owen on a business trip to England.

The English trip is disastrous as John Brown is forced to sell his wool at a low price thanks to an unfortunate error. Now that he is further financially ruined Owen urges his father to forget about business to focus on his true life's work: ending slavery. Returning home Owen and his father learn that a new law, the Fugitive Slave Act of 1850 has been passed. The act has the effect of radicalizing John Brown even further. In Springfield, Massachusetts, his former home and the base of his failed business, he preaches at a black church urging parishioners to choose to form a militia to defend themselves and vowing to join them. A small group of around 30 or so take a pledge with the Browns to use violence to protect themselves and the community from slave catchers. However, before the plan can be put to action, John Brown orders Owen to return to North Elba.

Returning to the farm Owen finds himself deeply uncomfortable around both Lyman and Susan Epps. After Susan has a stillbirth, Lyman and she stop working for the Browns and return to Timbuctoo. Owen finds himself obsessing over Susan and stalks the Epps cabin. He first believes he is in love with Susan though later he begins to believe he is actually in love with Lyman. After John Brown returns to the farm Owen and Lyman resume their friendship. After Owen fails to confess his love to Lyman, Lyman dies in a hunting accident that Owen believes he could have prevented, blaming himself for Lyman's death.

Shortly after Owen is tasked with his father with retrieving his brother Fred from Springfield and returning to North Elba. While he is there Fred reveals he has violent sexual thoughts regarding women. When Owen dismisses Fred's concerns Fred castrates himself. Owen then decides to defy his father and takes Fred to Kansas where his two older brothers, John Jr. and Jason, have settled for cheap land and to defend the abolitionist cause.

In Kansas Owen is dispirited to realize that while the pro-slavery forces are little more than a ragtag mob the abolitionist forces constantly seek to defer to them to avoid violence. Owen is eventually joined by his father and several of his brothers. Together they seek to violently defend their abolitionist neighbours and are surprised when they are repeatedly undercut by the politicians who only seek to appease. Owen finally urges his father towards violence and he, along with his brothers, murder 5 pro-slavery settlers in what is to be known as the Pottawatomie massacre. While Owen's older brothers are disturbed by the murders and decide to leave their father, John Brown forms a small militia of men who conduct small raids and is joined by a revolving group of white men who hold anti-slavery sentiments but who for the most part are disturbed by the killing. A few years later in Osawatomie while outnumbered by pro-slavery forces Brown nevertheless manages to capture the entire militia.

John Brown eventually becomes convinced he needs to raid Harpers Ferry where a large store of munitions is held believing that once word of his capture of the place becomes known he will be joined by white men who wish to abolish slavery and large contingents of slaves will be inspired to rebel and join him. Before the raid he has a private meeting with his friend and ally Frederick Douglass who does not endorse his plan and fears it will fail as he does not believe white men will risk their lives to free black people. John Brown goes forward with his plan anyway believing that Douglass will join him. He urges Owen to destroy his papers and then wait to meet up with any fleeing slaves. Owen does not burn his papers and instead watches as the raid fails as no one comes to join Brown and his militia and they are instead overwhelmed by a pro-slavery mob.

Brown reveals that he felt free after his father's capture but further reveals to Miss Mayo that he intends to commit suicide after finally finishing his account of his life with his father.

== Major themes ==
Banks raises a number of thematic questions during the lengthy portrayal of his subject matter. Notable among them are:

- How emotional attachment and hermetic exile provide for an unreliable narration.
- The moral consequences of radicalism: violent vs. non-violent protest.
- The fine line between sanity and religious fanaticism: "the Lord speaks to me."
- How strong familial attachment is itself a form of slavery.
- Loss of innocence.
- Your actions affect those around you (John Brown with his family and friends).

The narrative style employed by Banks is introspective and apologetic where each character's moral compass is seen as through the microscope of Owen Brown's telling; detailed and larger than life. Bank's prose uses language that registers on the psyche: evoking the conviction that redemption can be gained by an Augustinian confession. And yet the reader is goaded into sympathy with these characters by their sheer persistence in the face of seemingly insurmountable daily travails - evoking the innocence of a new-born country.

== Literary license ==
Banks takes great license with some of the historical figures in his narrative and very clearly states in his preface that his book is a work of fiction and not to be substituted for a work of biography or history.

Notable departures between historical fact and the fictionalized events in the books include:

- Owen Brown being alive in 1909 (50 years later) when the real Owen Brown died in 1889.
- Owen accompanying his father on his trip to England.
- Kitty is an invention.
- The timeline of the Browns move to North Elba.
- Owen's interest in Lyman's wife and in the pregnant young woman who kills herself jumping into the ocean during the trip to England.
- The time Lyman Epps and his wife spent with the Browns. Much of Lyman Epps Sr.'s life was heavily fictionalized, including his age, the name of his wife, and the time and cause of his death.
- In the novel, "Dutch" Henry Sherman, a stated target in the Pottawatomie spree, is killed. In reality he happened to be absent on the morning of the killings and thus survived. His brother William, however, was present and consequently murdered.

== Reception ==
The novel was reviewed positively in a number of places:

- "Russell Banks has created in Cloudsplitter an immediate landmark in American fiction"
- "Masterly ... a furious, sprawling drama that commands attention like thunder heard from just over the horizon." Time (quoted in:)
- "... a novel of near-biblical proportions about the abolitionist freedom fighter John Brown, is shaped like an explosive with an exceedingly long and winding fuse."

In 2011, The Guardian's Tom Cox selected Cloudsplitter as one of his "overlooked classics of American literature".

== Awards and nominations ==
Year	Award	Category	Result	Ref.
1999	Anisfield-Wolf Book Award	Fiction	Won	
1999	Audie Award	Solo Narration – Male	Finalist	
1999	Audie Award	Abridged Fiction	Won	
1999	PEN/Faulkner Award for Fiction	—	Finalist	
1999	Pulitzer Prize	Fiction	Finalist	

== Adaptations ==
In 2002, it was reported that Martin Scorsese was to produce a film adaptation of Cloudsplitter, to be directed by Raoul Peck, for the film production company HBO.

== See also ==
- The Good Lord Bird
