= Timbuctoo, New York =

Town in New York, United States

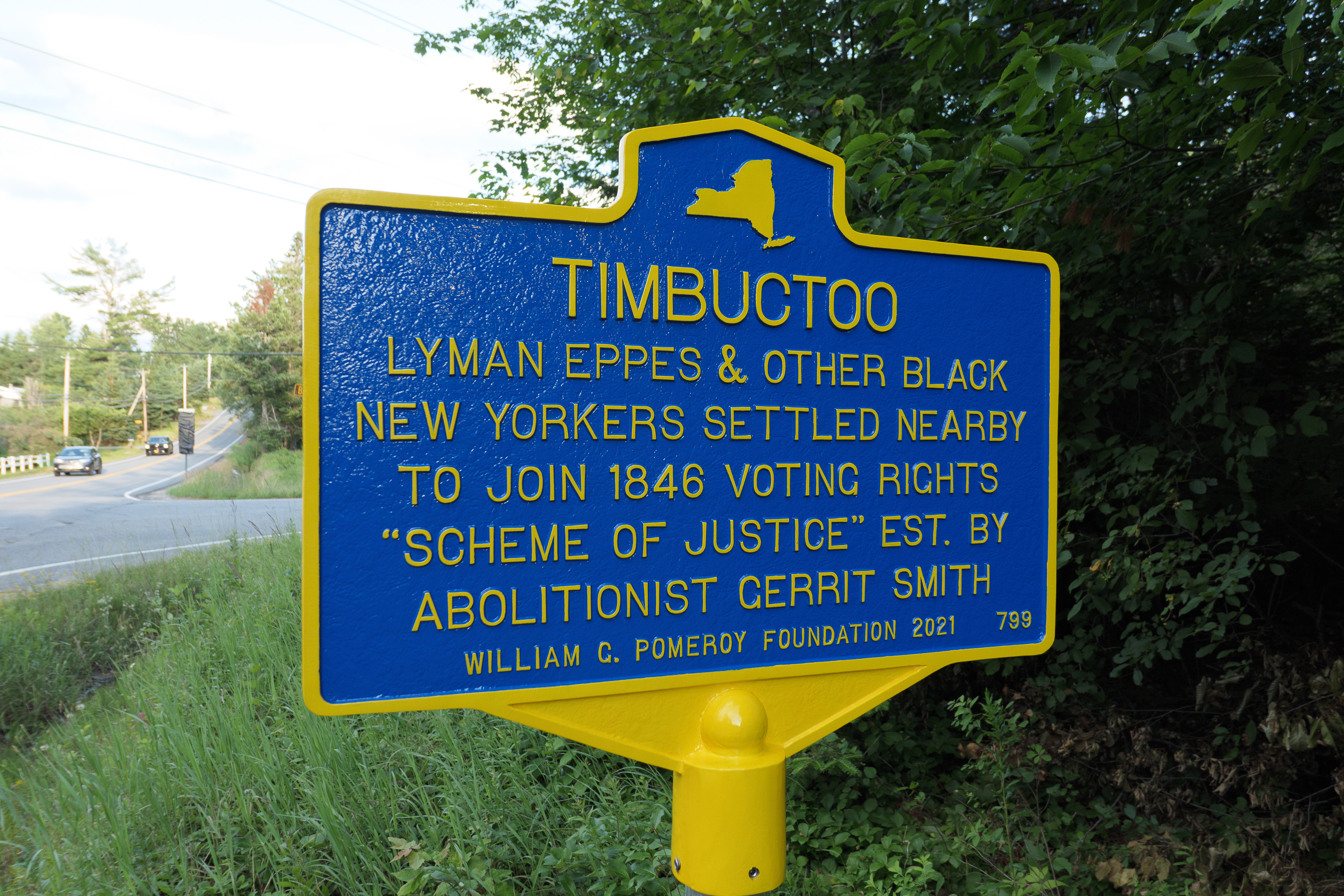
Historic marker at the corner of Old Military Road and Bear Cub Road in North Elba

Timbuctoo, New York, was a mid-19th century farming community of African-American homesteaders in the remote town of North Elba, New York. It was located in the vicinity of 44.22°N 73.99°W, near today's Lake Placid village (which did not exist then), in the Adirondack Mountains of Upstate New York. Contrary to the information given out by donor Gerrit Smith, who said that the lots were in clusters, they were spread out over an area 40 miles (64 km) north to south, and 15 miles (24 km) east to west.

Timbuctoo has acquired a mythical status in the history of New York State. The name was given to the settlement many years after its inception, by John Brown. The land is reforested and the exact location of the houses is unknown. While a historic marker was installed in July 2022, the settlement is not found on any local maps. There are no surviving buildings nor known foundations of buildings. There are no known photographs. (One frequently seen was in fact not taken in New York State.) It is not even clear who came up with the name, which was not widely used. The only thing remaining is the restored (to its 1859 state) house of its farming instructor John Brown, in whose barn a permanent exhibit on Timbuctoo is installed. However, that farmhouse of the John Brown Farm State Historic Site had not yet been built; the rented house he and his family lived in was destroyed by fire in 1900.

The story of Timbuctoo—in the 21st century becoming the subject of artistic works—is a tale of sin and redemption. An unfair, discriminatory measure—New York's imposition of a property qualification on black voters only—was to be made right by a saintly act, the wealthy Gerrit Smith's grand measure, giving black men he deemed worthy enough property (land) that they could vote. In theory, the project would have changed black urban wage workers into self-sufficient black land owners. But the redemption was only partial. A lot of Smith's land was very remote. What was supposed to have been a healthful escape from disease-ridden cities ended up being a great deal of hard work felling trees in a very cold climate. Only one black settler family remained permanently.

== Background ==
In its Constitution of 1821, New York State enacted a law that required free black men (only) to own real estate worth at least $250 (equivalent to $8,958 in 2025) or a house in order to be able to vote. An 1846 referendum on repealing this requirement failed by a large margin, at least 150,000, without carrying a single county. (In New York County, "for" 5,137; "against" 29,948.)

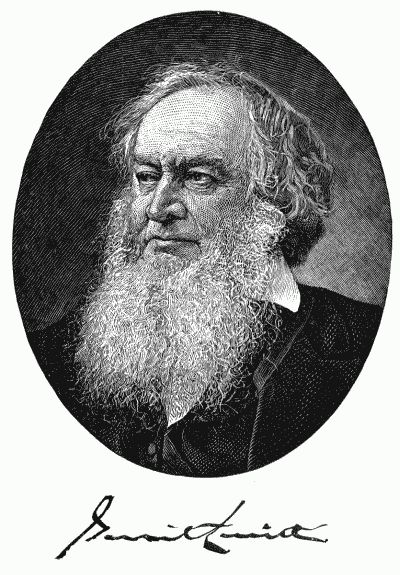
Gerrit Smith

Gerrit Smith, a wealthy abolitionist, announced in 1846 his plan to remedy this situation, giving away 120,000 acres of land to 3,000 needy black New Yorkers in 40 acres (16 ha) lots. It created rural land ownership and self-sufficiency for black people as an alternative to urban city life; gave black men access to the right to vote; and was an alternative response to the influx of Irish and white immigrants competing for urban employment.

Rural life seemed a way to escape from slave catchers looking for fugitives, some of whom would kidnap and sell free blacks into slavery. It was also a solution to the housing shortages and epidemics that plagued their crowded neighborhoods. "It seemed probable, the [scandalous?] political aspect would be exhibited of a town in New York controlled by negro suffrages, and represented in the county Board by colored supervisors."

Frederick Douglass and Henry Highland Garnet worked with Smith to promote the land distribution and recruitment to the Adirondacks. Smith wanted a certain type of person to inhabit Timbuctoo as they would be representing the masses. Some of the characteristics that those who wanted to live in Timbuctoo should possess included being completely sober, showing self-restraint, being responsible, and having good morals.

There were similar initiatives in Florence (Florence Farming Association), near Camden, New York; Vermontville, near Bloomingdale; and Blacksville, near Loon Lake, New York.

== First results ==
The first grantees to move did so early in 1848, and were sent off from Troy by a sermon of Henry Highland Garnet. The first problem was to locate their land. One minister, J. W. Loguen, told that settlers had been taken deliberately to less valuable land that was not theirs, and the swindlers then sought to purchase the supposedly less desirable land at discounted prices. He recommended that those not literate seek a literate acquaintance to accompany them, and that they stop first at the county clerk for directions to their property.

In addition, there was considerable opposition among whites already residing in Essex County to having colored residents. "I have heard the white inhabitants accuse Mr. Lewis [hired by Mr. Smith to survey his lands] of trying to ruin the town, by getting colored people to settle in this town, that the town would be represented by a black supervisor, &c. I have heard much abusive language used towards him in this town. ...The inhabitants replied that he was a fool, and that Mr. Smith, he (Lewis) and the blacks, ought to be banished to Africa, that if Smith and others would let the blacks alone that were here, they could starve them out, and the land would be settled by whites; that they would not live in a town surrounded by colored people, and if he (Lewis) surveyed the land, he would have to go armed, or he would get shot."

At its peak, the number of families in the North Elba and Loon Lake settlements combined was about 50 families, although in the 1850 census there were less than 30.

In 1848, Gerrit Smith gave Willis Hodges, a free black man from Virginia, 200 acres to settle in the Loon Lake area with ten families. They named it Blacksville. The community was disbanded after two winters due to harsh conditions. The difficulty of farming in the Adirondack region, coupled with the settlers' lack of experience in house-building and the bigotry of white neighbors, eventually caused most members of the Timbuctoo experiment to leave the region.

In 1849, John Brown moved his family to North Elba to support the development of Timbuctoo. Smith was a supporter of John Brown's antislavery activities and was accused of financially helping John Brown prepare for his 1859 raid on Harpers Ferry.

The number of fugitive slaves among those receiving a grant from Smith is debated.

== Another perspective on Smith's gift ==
Smith was seemingly being magnanimous in giving away a large amount of land, but said afterwards that he was "perhaps a better land-reformer in theory than in practice." The land he gave away was what he was unable to sell; he first sold all the land that he could. Furthermore, this undeveloped and unproductive land incurred Smith "a great amount of taxes". Enemies said he was making himself a reputation for generosity by giving away useless land. Nevertheless, Smith blamed the failure of Timbuctoo on the black men he had given the land to.

According to Smith, Blacks must "be better than the whites". "It is unreasonableness and cruelty, which have forced this necessity upon you. But, is it for that reason, a less wholesome necessity? —Are you, therefore, to be less thankful to God for it?" They need to stop "clustering in cities and large villages", and "resigning yourselves" to "menial occupation".

Smith describes the land in the Adirondacks as having "winters...long, the snows deep and the soil thin". According to him, "white men who dwell there can support their families only by very hard work and very frugal habits." Nevertheless, "the mass [of colored people] are ignorant and thriftless." Instead, they should "surpass their persecutors in all that honors manhood. They should swear that they will be Pariahs and lepers no longer. To this end, they should quit the towns, in which they are wont to congregate, and where they are but servants, and should scatter themselves over the country in the capacity of farmers and mechanics. They should cease trom the habit of wasting their earnings in periodical balls. They should never wet their lips with intoxicating drinks nor defile them with tobacco."

== The duration of Timbuctoo ==
According to Smith in 1857, fewer than 50 families of the planned 3,000 had actually taken possession of the land he granted them. Half of the 3,000 had either sold the land or had it sold to pay taxes.

The U.S. Census shows that in 1850 there were only thirteen black families in North Elba. By 1870 members of the Epps, Hasbrook, Wurtz, and Miles families remained. Only the Epps family stayed permanently, and Lyman Epps became a local celebrity and played an important role in the early growth of Lake Placid village.

The majority of the recipients of Smith's gifts were "not generally accustomed to farm labor", and "still less familliarized to clearing off heavy timber". Many were literate city folk, such as James Henderson, a shoemaker from Troy with five children, who got lost in the snow and froze to death. Many were cooks, coachmen, or barbers. "They had none of the qualities of farmers," said an article in the Journal of Negro History, adding that they had been "disabled by infirmities and vices". Smith's land was "in no respect remarkably inviting". Those setting out to live on the land Smith had given them found that the first task was to build themselves a "house", a one-room structure whose walls were logs the new resident had chopped down himself. Then more trees needed to be cut down to free land for crops.

In addition, the weather was terribly cold, the coldest in the state of New York, more so than most of them had ever experienced. The winter was long and the growing season short. Finally, starting a farm takes at least a little money: for seed, tools, and draft animals, not to mention the cost of getting to the farm and surviving until a crop is produced. Also, there are land taxes to be paid. No provision was made for any of this.

John Brown did make a profitable farm in North Elba. But he had grown boys to help him, and he had at least a little money.

== Timbuctoo residents ==
=== Lyman Epps Sr. and Jr. ===
Lyman and Anne Epps were said by their son, Lyman Jr., to have been fugitive slaves. They moved with their two children from Troy, New York, to North Elba. The Epps family managed to remain in North Elba, where Lyman became a music teacher, leader of the community and helped to found the local sabbath school, the Lake Placid Public Library, and the Lake Placid Baptist Church. Epps was able to make a living by becoming a sheep herder and cultivating the land. His family lived in the area for over 100 years. Lyman Epps Sr. died at the age of eighty-three in 1897. The last member of the Epps family, Lyman Epps, Jr., was the last person alive who had seen, as a young man, Brown's funeral and burial. He shared his recollections with an interviewer. He died in 1942, aged 102. A marker at his grave was paid for by the John Brown Memorial Association. This marker is the only visible record of Timbuctoo's existence—there are no other markers, street or road signs, or ruins of the cabins. No map shows where it was.

=== John Thomas ===
John Thomas was born into slavery on the eastern shore of Virginia. He escaped around 1839 to Philadelphia before he continued on to Troy, New York. He married Mary Vanderhyden and they began a family in upstate New York. John was one of the people to accept Gerritt Smith's offer for the land grant. Bounty hunters eventually came for him in the Adirondacks. Due to Smith's principles that helped found the settlement, many of the white men backed Thomas and warned the bounty hunters that they would protect him at all cost. They also warned that Thomas was armed and dangerous and would do anything to prevent being sold back into slavery. The bounty hunters left and never returned. Thomas did not live in Timbuctoo but further north, in Vermontville Franklin, Franklin County, New York. He remained there for the rest of his life and died in 1894 at the age of eighty-three.

=== William Appo ===
A part-time member of the settlement, his son was killed at the Second Battle of Bull Run, aged 18. He is buried in the North Elba cemetery.

== Legacy ==
John Brown's farmhouse, and its barn, are the only buildings related to the Timbuctoo project still standing. Aside from that, all signs of settlement have been lost. It cannot be found on maps of the Adirondacks, and none of the houses that black people resided in were preserved; all have disappeared. A historical marker was placed at the corner of Old Military and Bear Cub roads in Lake Placid in June 2022 (see picture above).

An episode in Russell Banks' John Brown novel Cloudsplitter takes place in Timbuctoo.

=== Videos (most recent first) ===
- Miller, Paul A. (2021), Searching for Timbuctoo

Miller’s film Searching for Timbuctoo reveals the history of this community and follows SUNY-Potsdam archaeologist Dr. Hadley Kruczek-Aaron who, since 2009, has tried to unearth the elusive settlement. Miller filmed Kruczek-Aaron and her team of students who have permission to break ground at the John Brown State Historic Site.

Kruczek-Aaron did her doctoral dissertation on her public digs at the Gerrit Smith Estate in Peterboro. Amy Godine, author, historian and noted expert on the Timbuctoo Black settlement, and Martha Swan, founder and executive director of John Brown Lives!, share historical background in the film. Norman K. Dann PhD, Gerrit Smith biographer, is also interviewed in the film. District 20 Congressman Paul D. Tonko performs the voice of abolitionist Gerrit Smith in the film.

- Basulto, Victoria (August 23, 2021), The Quest for Enfranchisement: Timbuctoo, National Abolition Hall of Fame and Museum, Peterboro
- Bradwell, Sean Eversley (2012), Dreaming of Timbuctoo: Seeing is Believing [panel discussion], The History Center in Tompkins County, Ithaca

=== Other media ===
- Discovering Timbuctoo, A New York Minute in History, WAMC, Northeast Public Radio, June 30, 2021. Interviewed are Amy Godine, historian and curator of the "Dreaming of Timbuctoo" exhibit; Paul Miller, director and producer of the upcoming film Searching for Timbuctoo; Dr. Hadley Kruczek-Aaron, director of the Timbuctoo Archeology Project; and Russell Banks, bestselling author of Cloudsplitter.
- Voice of Timbuctoo is an oratorio composed by Glenn McClure.
- Promised Land: An Adirondack Folk Opera, by Glenn McClure, is a work in progress.

=== The exhibit "Dreaming of Timbuctoo'" ===
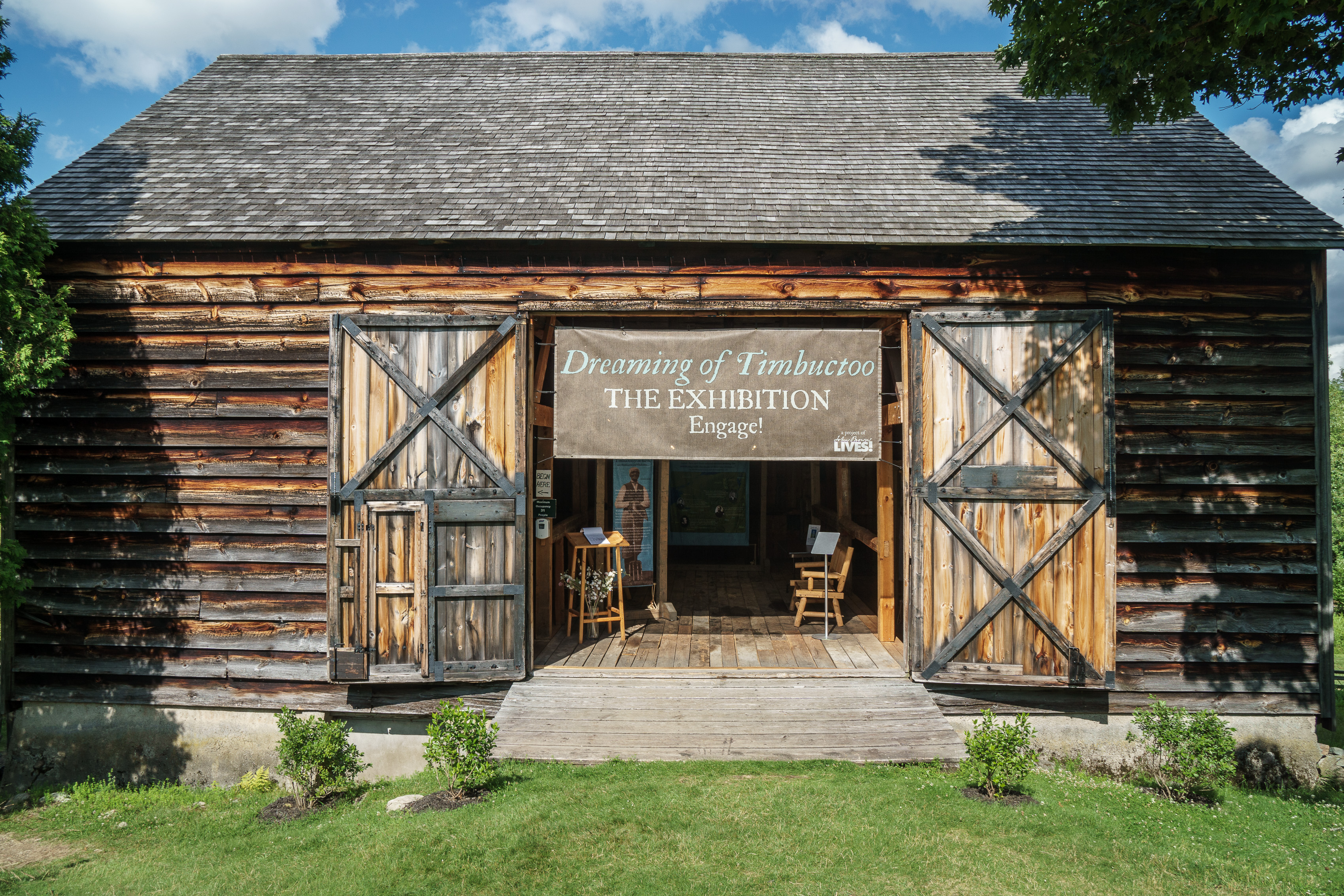
Dreaming of Timbuctoo exhibition at the John Brown Farm State Historic Site

- In 2001, an exhibit called "John Brown 'Dreaming of Timbuctoo'", curated by Amy Godine, opened at the Adirondack Experience Museum in Blue Mountain Lake. The exhibit documents the story of these black homesteaders that were given land in the Adirondacks in the mid-1840s.
- In 2002 it was displayed at the Brooklyn Public Library, Brooklyn, New York, and at the Peterboro Area Museum in Peterboro, New York.
- By 2003 it had been shown at the Tang Teaching Museum at Skidmore College, Saratoga Springs, New York, Paul Smith's College, Utica College, and the Adirondack History Museum in Elizabethtown, New York.
- In 2003–2004 it was at the New York State Museum, Albany, New York.
- From July 3–9, 2011, it was shown at the Whallonsburg Grange Hall, Whallonsburg, New York. An activity was a visit to the Timbuctoo Archeology Project dig underway at one of the Timbuctoo homesteads, under the direction of Dr. Hadley Kruczek-Aaron, SUNY–Potsdam.
- From July 29 to September 14, 2011, it was shown at Paul Smith's College, Paul Smiths, New York.
- In 2012 it was exhibited at the History Center in Ithaca, New York, inder the sponsorship of Cornell University and Ithaca College.
- In 2013 it was shown at the Nassau County African American Museum in Hempstead, New York.
- In 2016 the John Brown Farm State Historic Site became the permanent home of an updated “Dreaming of Timbuctoo” exhibit.
- In 2021 a travelling installation was on display in Middlebury, Vermont.

=== Blues at Timbuctoo ===
There is an annual Blues at Timbuctoo festival in Lake Placid. The festival is held at the historic John Brown Farm, and includes music and conversations around race relations. The festival was launched in 2015.

== See also ==
- Timbuctoo, California
- Timbuctoo, New Jersey
- Timbuktu, Mali

== Further reading (most recent first) ==
- On Timbuctoo, New York
  - Walter, Takeyce (October 2023). "The Black Woods". Adirondack Life: 39, 53–64 (on Godine's book).
  - Godine, Amy (2023). The black woods : pursuing racial justice on the Adirondack frontier. Ithaca, New York: Cornell University Press. ISBN 9781501771682.
  - Riddle, Holly (December 18, 2021). "Finding Timbuctoo. How a nonprofit, archeologist and filmmaker came together to showcase a little-known Adirondack settlement". Adirondack Explorer.
  - Feeley, Lynne (2019). "The Elevationists: Gerrit Smith, Black Agrarianism, and Land Reform in 1840s New York". Environmental History. 24 (2): 307–326. doi:10.1093/envhis/emy126. ISSN 1084-5453.
  - Svenson, Sally E. (2017). Blacks in the Adirondacks : a history. Syracuse, New York: Syracuse University Press. ISBN 9780815654216.
  - Kruczek-Aaron, Hadley (2015). "Race and Remembering in the Adirondacks. Accounting for Timbucto in the Past and the Present". In Matthews, Christopher N.; McGovern, Allison Manfra (eds.). The Archaeology of Race in the Northeast. pp. 134–149. doi:10.5744/florida/9780813060576.003.0007. ISBN 9780813060576.
  - Miller, Daegan (2013). "At Home in the Great Northern Wilderness: African Americans and Freedom's Ecology in the Adirondacks, 1846-1859". Environmental Humanities. 2 (1): 117–146. doi:10.1215/22011919-3610378.
  - McDaniel, W. Caleb (August 11, 2010), In Search of John Brown's Timbucto
  - Godine, Amy (Spring–Summer 2003), "The Making of an Exhibition - Dreams of Timbuctoo" (PDF), Voices: The Journal of New York Folklore, 29 (1–2), archived from the original (PDF) on August 3, 2018
  - Christian, Nichole M. (September 19, 2002). "Recalling Timbuctoo, A Slice of Black History". New York Times. p. B5.
  - Jones, Katherine Butler (Winter 1998), "They called it Timbuctoo" (PDF), Orion: 27–32, archived from the original (PDF) on March 24, 2016
  - "Timbucto: African American History in the Adirondacks", Adirondack Journal, Adirondack Experience. The Museum on Blue Mountain Lake, April 4, 2017
- Other black communities
  - Brown, Phil (May 5, 2017). "Negro Brook Has It All: Thickets, Blowdown, Rapids". Adirondack Explorer.
  - Brown, DeNeen (August 3, 2010), "Excavation of sites such as Timbuctoo, N.J., is helping to rewrite African American history", Washington Post
  - Chenowith, Henry, Timbuctoo [California], ghosttowns.com
