= The Sweet Hereafter (novel) =

1991 novel by Russell Banks

- First edition
- Author: Russell Banks
- Language: English
- Publisher: HarperCollins
- Publication date: 1991
- Pages: 257

The Sweet Hereafter is a 1991 novel by American author Russell Banks. It is set in a small town in the aftermath of a deadly school bus accident that has killed most of the town's children. The novel was adapted into an award-winning 1997 film of the same name by Canadian director Atom Egoyan.

The book was chosen in 1998 by Nancy Pearl, the then Director of the Washington Center for the Book at the Seattle Public Library, and Chris Higashi, the current Program Manager, to be the first selection for "If All Seattle Read the Same Book". This program has continued in the Seattle community and at many other public libraries around the country.

== Plot ==
The Sweet Hereafter is a multiple first-person narrative depicting life in a small town in Upstate New York in the wake of a school bus accident in which many local children are killed. Their grieving parents are approached by a slick city lawyer who wants them to sue for damages. At first the parents are reluctant to do so, but eventually they are persuaded by the lawyer that filing a lawsuit would ease their minds and also be the right thing to do.

As most of the children are dead, the case now depends on the testimony in court of the few surviving witnesses. In particular, the deposition of 14-year-old Nichole Burnell, who was sitting at the front of the bus and is now paralyzed from the waist down by the accident, is considered all-important. However, she unexpectedly accuses the driver Dolores Driscoll of speeding and thus causing the accident. When she does so, any hope by survivors and grieving parents of receiving money are thwarted. All the people involved know that Nichole is lying but cannot do anything about it. Only her father knows why, but he is unable to publicly reveal his daughter's motives.

The novel captures the atmosphere in a small town suddenly shaken by catastrophe. Only the reader knows that Mitchell Stephens, the lawyer, has just learned that he has effectively lost his own child—his estranged, drug-addicted daughter informs him that she has just tested HIV-positive.

== Basis of novel ==
The novel was based on a 1989 bus crash in Alton, Texas and its aftermath. At 7:30 A.M. on September 21, 1989, a Coca-Cola truck hit a Mission school bus, knocking it into a gravel pit at the corner of Five-Mile Road and Bryan Road. Twenty-one children from the Alton area were drowned, and 49 were injured. This was the worst school bus accident to date in Texas history. The driver of the truck, Ruben Perez, was found to be at fault for the crash by the National Transportation Safety Board.

Some lawyers faced ethics charges in their rush to file suit after the accident. Dozens of lawyers hurried to Alton, reportedly approaching families even in the morgue and in hospitals. The soft-drink truck was owned by Valley Coca-Cola, a division of the soft drink company. The bus manufacturer was sued on the grounds that the standard rear emergency door should have been supplemented with an exit on the left side of the bus, which would have permitted most or all of the children to escape (this crash occurred only months after another bus disaster in Kentucky, in which the number of emergency exits played a role in fatalities). The community of Alton was sued by families because the pit was not thoroughly barricaded.

The State Bar of Texas sought to bring actions against lawyers whom it believed to be paying people to refer clients to them. Some families who settled soon after the accident sued again after discovering that other families had received larger settlements. The 350 lawsuits resulted in settlements totaling more than $150 million. In the end, Valley Coca-Cola paid some $144 million in claims, of which lawyers took an estimated $50 million. Families who lost children received about $4.5 million from Valley Coca-Cola for each boy or girl who died, while the 60 children who survived each received an estimated $500,000 to $900,000.

Few of the citizens of Alton attended the criminal trial for the truck driver. Many think that the money received from the lawsuits only brought the town trouble.

== Intertextual connection ==
Banks's 2012 novel Lost Memory of Skin reveals that, after the events of The Sweet Hereafter, Dolores Driscoll moved to Florida in an effort "to get away from the memories of all that and try to start her life over in her late fifties."
