= Abby Norman =

Abby Norman may refer to:

- Abby Norman (beauty pageant titleholder), Miss Wyoming USA
- Abby Norman (writer), American science writer
