= The Magic Kingdom (novel) =

2022 novel by Russell Banks

- Author: Russell Banks
- Language: English
- Publisher: Alfred A. Knopf
- Publication date: 2022
- Publication place: United States
- Media type: Print
- Pages: 352

The Magic Kingdom is a 2022 novel by American author Russell Banks. It tells the story of Harley Mann, who grows up on a Shaker colony in Central Florida on land that later became Walt Disney World. It was Banks's 14th novel, and his last before his death.

== Plot ==
In the frame narrative, a fictional version of author Russell Banks describes his discovery of a series of audio tapes recorded in 1971 by Harley Mann, who had owned a vast acreage in Central Florida he had sold to The Walt Disney Company for the creation of Walt Disney World. The rest of the novel comprises transcripts of the Mann's testimony, with a forward and afterward by the fictional Banks.

Mann grew up with his Utopian family in Ruskinite colonies until schism and his father's death led the rest of the family into a life of virtual slavery on a Georgia plantation. Shaker Elder John Bennett frees them in exchange for them joining the Shaker colony of New Bethany near St. Cloud, Florida. Mann finds a mentor in Elder John and becomes enamored with Sadie Pratt, a tuberculosis patient who the Shakers take in. Mann and Sadie sleep together, in contravention of the Shakers' firm vow of celibacy, but as her disease worsens, Sadie tells Mann she is pregnant, either by him or Elder John, and asks him euthanize her with morphine. Mann refuses, but Elder John and Eldress Mary Glynn help her die.

Believing the elders may have done this not to end Sadie's suffering but to protect themselves, Mann tells the sheriff about their role in Sadie's death. The ensuing courtroom scandal tears the colony apart. Ultimately, the elders are acquitted, and Mann becomes a pariah. The Shakers eventually sell their property and leave New Bethany. Mann starts acquiring their acreage, becoming a successful real estate broker, but realizes he can never recover what he lost. Years later, an elderly Mann agrees to sell to a mysterious buyer who agrees never to subdivide the land – the Walt Disney Company. In the afterward, Banks reveals that Mann died in 1972 when his house was subsumed by a sinkhole, but that someone, likely his younger sister Rachel, went out and installed Shaker headstones for Mann, Sadie and Eldress Mary Glynn that still stand in the marsh in Disney's Animal Kingdom.

== Background ==
The Magic Kingdom is inspired by the historical Shaker community of Olive Branch, located in the same area as Banks' fictional New Bethany, which existed from 1995-1924. As in Banks's novel, the commune was the subject of a euthanasia case that led to its demise. The novel's Sadie Pratt is based on Sadie Marchant, who had moved to a sanitarium in Florida while suffering a terminal case of tuberculosis in 1905. The penniless Marchant was unable to return home when the sanitarium closed, and the Shakers took her in at Olive Branch. In 1911, Marchant was suffering incredible pain from her disease, and Brother Egbert Gillette, the model for Banks's Elder John, administered a lethal dose of opiates.

During the criminal investigation, Gillette openly admitted to this act of euthanasia, saying he had done it at Marchant's request. Rumors that Marchant was pregnant and not near death were disproven by the coroner's inquest. The case led to a nationwide debate on euthanasia and an outpouring of support for the Shakers, and ultimately the state attorney dropped all charges against Gillette and Sister Elizabeth Sears. Still, most of the members departed the colony, and in 1924 it was totally abandoned.

The novel features other characters drawn from history, including Cyrus Teed, a self-proclaimed messiah who founded Koreshan Unity, a commune that taught humanity lived inside of a hollow earth. It also features events from Florida history, including the land grab that came in the 19th century when brokers acquired and then dishonestly sold off thousands of acres of former federal land, and Walt Disney's assembling of the vast property that became Disney World.

== Reception ==
The Magic Kingdom was well received by critics. In a review for The London Review of Books Ange Mlinko wrote that "the barbarous story of how a mosquito-and-alligator-infested swampland became cultivated for agriculture – and, yes, real estate – provides the bass line for a novel whose melodic line, floating above, circles the loftier issue of community formations, and what binds or dissolves them." Kirkus Reviews wrote that "the core is the emotional mirror of memory, a construct of events and their recall, or, for a writer wondering how he will be remembered, a construct of his books and readers, for whom Banks may well be a prized piece of gray matter," calling the novel "a multilayered tale of innocence and guilt from a gifted storyteller."

The Wall Street Journal wrote that "Mr. Banks has created a quietly beautiful memorial to a transitory way of life that would soon disappear behind the theme-park attractions of contemporary America." In the Los Angeles Times, Mark Athitakis wrote that Banks's main focus is "the philosophical questions sparked by Harley and Sadie’s connection. Can any ideology survive under the weight of our clumsy humanity? Does a belief system temper our individual greed or stoke it? How much of our judgment of others’ shortcomings is a way of ignoring our own? Is the law equipped to handle morality, especially in the face of power?" Despite this, the reviewer found that "the novel isn’t airless. Dramatic, almost biblical events abound: enslavement, panthers, sinkholes, fires and other Job-worthy catastrophes. As ever, Banks writes gorgeously about the state’s natural wonders, pointing out the strange magnetism a place needs to have to attract the world’s detritus."
