= Afflicted (TV series) =

American docu-series on Netflix

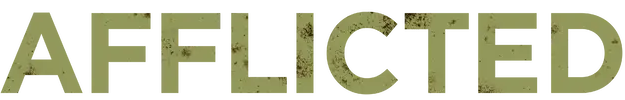
- Genre: Documentary
- No. of seasons: 1
- No. of episodes: 7

Production
- Executive producers: Peter Logreco; Dan Partland
- Cinematography: Ben Bloodwell; Bryan Donnell
- Running time: 37–46 minutes
- Production company: Doc Shop Productions

Original release
- Network: Netflix
- Release: August 10, 2018

Afflicted is an American documentary television series on Netflix. The show follows individuals suffering from various chronic diseases and illnesses, seeking treatment and cures. Netflix released all seven episodes of its first season on August 10, 2018.

== Episodes ==
No.	Title	Original release date
1	"Chapter 1: Toxic World"	August 10, 2018
2	"Chapter 2: Support"	August 10, 2018
3	"Chapter 3: Identity"	August 10, 2018
4	"Chapter 4: The Mind"	August 10, 2018
5	"Chapter 5: The Cost"	August 10, 2018
6	"Chapter 6: Mind & Body"	August 10, 2018
7	"Chapter 7: Well"	August 10, 2018

== Controversy ==
Since its release, the show has received backlash for its portrayal of chronic illnesses as psychosomatic or psychiatric disorders. HuffPost's Caitlin Flynn wrote that the series "failed the chronic illness community". Cast members on the show have since publicly come out against the show and its editing practices. A group of physicians, scientists, filmmakers, writers, and others, including Sini Anderson, Jennifer Brea, Mario R. Capecchi, Ronald W. Davis, Lena Dunham, Maya Dusenbery, H. Craig Heller, Judith Heumann, Porochista Khakpour, Deborah Hoffmann, Monica Lewinsky, Abby Norman, Meghan O'Rourke, Frances Reid and Maysoon Zayid, have petitioned Netflix to remove the series from its platform, identifying misrepresentation of subjects and questionable tactics as well as medical and scientific flaws as key problems.

In 2019 seven of the participants in the series sued Netflix and the producers for defamation, false-light invasion of privacy, unjust enrichment and fraud over the way they were depicted on screen. Netflix asked the Court to dismiss the case because participants signed releases. However, the trial court and appeals court ruled against Netflix and allowed the case to proceed. In a unanimous decision from the appellate court, the panel ruled that the consent releases the subjects signed aren’t enforceable because the participants were lied to and pressured to waive their rights not to be defamed.

The lawsuit was settled in 2023. Details of the settlement were not disclosed.
