= The Darling (novel) =

2004 historical novel written by Russell Banks

- Softcover edition
- Author: Russell Banks
- Language: English
- Genre: Historical
- Publisher: HarperCollins
- Publication place: United States
- Media type: Print, e-book, audiobook
- Pages: 400 pp (first edition, hardback)
- ISBN: 978-0060197353

The Darling is a historical novel written by Russell Banks, and published on October 12, 2004, by HarperCollins.

== Summary ==
The novel is narrated by Hannah Musgrave, a woman in her fifties reflecting back on her life as a politically radical student who later became a member of the Weathermen and changes her name to Dawn Carrington. After a series of failed relationships with men, Dawn takes on a young mother named Carol as her lover and lives with her and her daughter Bettina while carrying on secret activities for the weathermen. After Zack, another member of her cell, erroneously tells her that they are both wanted by drug dealers, she flees with him to Ghana before moving on to the city of Monrovia in Liberia in 1975. There she meets and eventually marries the Minister of Public Health, Woodrow Sundiata, who is aware of her political past but is willing to overlook it because of the status that a white American woman brings to his family.

Their marriage is one of convenience on both sides and during the time they are together Hannah gives birth to three sons: Dillon, a math prodigy, and twin boys William and Paul. Motherhood does not come naturally to Hannah and she feels cold and distant with her children while at the same time feeling warm and loving to the chimpanzees she works with as part of her job.

In 1980 William R. Tolbert, Jr., the president of Liberia and a friend of Woodrow's, is murdered during a coup d'état. He is replaced by Samuel Doe. Hannah's life remains relatively comfortable throughout the political upheaval and she remains ignorant of the political situation in Liberia until three years later, in 1983, when she is 40 years old, when Woodrow is taken away from home in the middle of the night on accusations that he and Charles Taylor have embezzled aid relief for their own personal use. Woodrow is eventually able to successfully free himself but as a condition of his release Hannah is forced to return to America without her sons. Hannah is secretly relieved at the idea of abandoning her children and husband, though she mourns her separation from her chimpanzees.

In America Hannah decides to visit her parents for the first time in 15 years. After surprising her mother she learns that her father suffered a cerebral hemorrhage a few weeks before her return. Though her mother is optimistic about his recovery Hannah quickly realizes that he is completely brain-dead. She is able to visit her father once in the hospital before he dies. Shaken by the death of her father, Hannah steals her mothers car and goes to find Carol. She finds Zack living there and he tells her of his brief incarceration in a low-security prison where he met Charles Taylor. Hannah goes to meet Charles Taylor in jail and after he tells her that, once free, he will assassinate Samuel Doe and allow Hannah to return home, she agrees to help him escape from jail.

After helping Charles Taylor to flee America, Hannah begins to correspond with her husband Woodrow. She learns that Samuel Doe has lifted his imposed ban on her and she is free to return to Liberia.

Once in Liberia Hannah decides to open a rescue sanctuary for her beloved chimpanzees while she waits patiently for Charles Taylor to return and overthrow Samuel Doe. Eventually Charles Taylor and a small guerrilla group begin to invade Liberia, triggering the beginning of the First Liberian Civil War. Since Hannah and her family live in the country's capital, Monrovia they are able to stay protected for some time. Eventually, Samuel Doe, fearful that he is losing power, sends a group of assassins to murder Woodrow. Hannah and her children witness the murder and her sons run off shortly thereafter to join any of the rebel armies against Samuel Doe.

Hannah spends the rest of her time in Liberia fruitlessly searching for her sons despite the urging of Sam Clement, the American ambassador, to leave for America. He at last provides a video tape showing that her children are now child soldiers working for Prince Johnson who have murdered Samuel Doe. He also reveals that the Americans were behind Charles Taylor's escape from prison and rise to power and that they have known Hannah's true identity and movements for decades. Hannah, dispirited that all along she was working on behalf of the interests of the CIA finally leaves Liberia.

== Reception ==
The novel received positive reviews upon its publication. The Guardian called it "an urgent, passionate, compelling panorama" while noting that it "deserves to stand beside Conrad and Greene." The Village Voice praised Hannah as "The Darling's only full-bodied character, a monstrously magnetic woman" but criticized Bank's "inability or unwillingness to bring Hannah's African family to life" calling it a "major failure on Banks's part, in a book otherwise reverberating with ideas and startling prose."

== Adaptations ==
A film adaptation of The Darling starring Cate Blanchett and directed by Martin Scorsese was planned and later scrapped. In 2011 Jessica Chastain was rumoured to be attached to the role of Hannah with Denis Villeneuve directing.
