= The New World (short story collection) =

1978 short story collection by Russell Banks

- First edition cover
- Author: Russell Banks
- Publisher: University of Illinois Press
- Publication date: December 1, 1978

The New World is a 1978 short story collection by American writer Russell Banks.

== Contents ==
- "The Custodian" – first appeared in New Boston Review
- "The Perfect Couple" – Fiction International, nos. 6/7 (1976)
- "A Sentimental Education"
- "About the Late Zimma (Penny) Cate: Selections from Her Loving Husband's Memory Hoard" – TriQuarterly, Fall 1977
- "The Conversation" – Shenandoah, Fall 1977
- "The Rise of the Middle Class" – Canto, September 1977
- "Indisposed" – Matrix, June 1978
- "The Caul" – Mississippi Review, Spring 1978
- "The Adjutant Bird" – Lillabulero 1, no. 3 (July 1967)
- "The New World" – Ploughshares 3, no. 2 (1976)

== Publication history ==
- Russell Banks, The New World, 1978. ISBN 0-252-00722-0

== See also ==
- 1978 in literature
