= The Angel on the Roof =

Collection of short stories by Russell Banks

- First edition (publ. HarperCollins)
- Author: Russell Banks
- Publisher: HarperCollins
- Publication date: June 4, 2000
- ISBN: 0-06-017396-3

The Angel on the Roof: The Stories of Russell Banks (2000) is a collection of short stories by Russell Banks. It consists of a total of thirty-one previously published stories, including twenty-two stories that appeared in earlier short story collections, along with nine that were previously uncollected.

== Contents ==
Twenty-two of the thirty-one stories that Banks selected for this volume were published in four earlier collections, although Banks writes that many of the stories "have been revised for this edition". The previously collected stories were originally published in the following volumes by Banks: Searching for Survivors (New York: Fiction Collective/ Braziller, 1975); Trailerpark (New York: HarperCollins, 1981); Success Stories (New York: HarperCollins, 1986).

In his "Note" appended at the end of this volume, Russell Banks writes the following:

As this book is published, I am turning sixty, and these stories represent the best work I have done in the form over the thirty-seven years since I began trying to write in prose — at least that’s my hope.

=== Previously collected stories ===
The following is a list of the previously collected stories republished in The Angel on the Roof, under the titles of the collections in which they originally appeared:

==== From Searching for Survivors (1975) ====
- “Searching for Survivors”
- “With Ché in New Hampshire”
- “Theory of Flight” (originally “With Ché at Kitty Hawk”)
- “The Neighbor”
- “The Lie”
- “Defenseman”

==== From The New World (1978) ====
- “The Rise of the Middle Class”
- “Indisposed”
- “The Caul”

==== From Trailerpark (1981) ====
- “The Guinea Pig Lady”
- “Black Man and White Woman in Dark Green Rowboat”
- “Dis Bwoy, Him Gwan”
- “Comfort”
- “The Burden”
- “Child Screams and Looks Back at You”
- “The Fisherman”

==== From Success Stories (1986) ====
- “Queen for a Day”
- “The Fish”
- “Success Story”
- “Mistake”
- “Sarah Cole: A Type of Love Story”
- “Firewood”

=== Uncollected stories ===
The previously uncollected stories in The Angel on the Roof are as follows (with the original publication/periodical in parentheses):

- “Plains of Abraham” (Esquire)
- “Djinn” (Esquire)
- “Lobster Night” (Esquire)
- “The Visit” (The Village Voice Literary Supplement)
- “Xmas” (The Boston Globe Magazine)
- “The Moor” (Conjunctions)
- “Cow-Cow” (GQ)
- “Quality Time” (Ploughshares)
- “Assisted Living” (?)

== See also ==
- 2000 in literature
