= Rule of the Bone =

1995 novel by Russell Banks

- First edition
- Author: Russell Banks
- Language: English
- Genre: Bildungsroman, Literary fiction
- Publisher: HarperCollins
- Publication date: 1995
- Publication place: United States
- Media type: Print (hardback & paperback)
- Pages: 320 pp
- ISBN: 0-436-20249-2
- OCLC: 33043858
- Followed by: Cloudsplitter

Rule of the Bone is a 1995 novel by Russell Banks. It is a Bildungsroman, or coming-of-age story about the 14-year-old American narrator Chappie, later dubbed Bone (named for a tattoo that he gets), who, after having dropped out of school, turns to the guidance of a Rastafarian Jamaican migrant worker.

== Structure ==
The novel is split into two halves: the first concerns his family struggles in America, and the second describes his experiences in Jamaica. Some critics, such as Michiko Kakutani for The New York Times, describe the book as descending from other novels about rebellious teens, such as J. D. Salinger's The Catcher in the Rye and Mark Twain's Adventures of Huckleberry Finn [New York Times review, May 19, 1995]. The book contains frank descriptions of drug use such as marijuana and methamphetamine, and sexual abuse by the narrator's stepfather, which, coupled with the young age of the narrator, has contributed to the book's controversy.

== Characters ==
Chapman Dorset (a.k.a. Chappie, Bone) is the protagonist of the book. He is a 14-year-old drug dealer living in upstate New York with his mother and his abusive stepfather. He runs away from home to live with his best friend and a biker gang. Bone, although a hardened drug dealer on the outside, is revealed to be quite compassionate, wanting to free an abused girl named Froggy from her captor and to return his mentor I-Man back to his home. In the end he gives up on family.

I-Man is Bone's mentor and becomes his closest friend. He is a Rastafarian migrant worker living illegally in upstate New York in an old school bus that has been emptied and fixed up. He flies home to Jamaica with Bone, where he returns to the drug trade. I-Man is not only Bone's mentor and close friend but he also becomes somewhat of a father figure to Bone, something that he has never been able to find in Ken and Doc.

Paul Dorset (a.k.a. Doc) is Bone's estranged father, who left his mother when Bone was young and moved to Jamaica. He has a relationship with Evening Star and stays with her in Starport/the Mothership.

Rose (a.k.a. Froggy) is a little girl who was sold by her mother to Buster Brown, a pedophile. She is from Milwaukee. Bone saves her from her captor and she lives for some time in the bus with him and I-man. Eventually he pays to return her to her mother in Milwaukee.

Russ is Bone's best friend at the beginning of the narrative. He is a 16-year-old school dropout and stoner. He worked at the Video Den before he was fired for stealing from the cash register.

Evening Star is an American heiress/socialite in Jamaica who uses her house to constantly host elite American guests who come down to partake of her parties, which include frequent drug use, reggae music, and what amounts to prostitution with the locals. Her house is called Starport and nicknamed the Mothership by Bone.

Buster Brown is a pedophile who bought Froggy from her mother. He is also the manager of a hip-hop group called theSoul Assassins.

Ken is Mrs. Dorset's husband and Bone's stepfather. He is sexually abusive and an alcoholic.

Bruce is the leader of an outlaw motorcycle gang, Adirondack Iron, which is based in Russ's apartment above the Video Den, where Bone stays when he first runs away from home. After the apartment catches on fire, Bruce goes back to save Bone, which causes Bone to remember him fondly.

== Major themes ==
Many different reviewers compared Rule of the Bone to other coming of age novels such as Huckleberry Finn and The Catcher in the Rye.

== Reception ==
Rule of the Bone received mixed reviews. In one article, Ed Peaco gave praise to the novel by saying, “Like Huck Finn, Bone’s slyly unsophisticated voice explores big questions like love, sex, crime, sin, race, class, and the fate of children in a fractured society.” Critics admired Banks’ style with one quoting: “...When it inhabits the cooly [sic?] wised-up consciousness of Chappie, aka “Bone”, it’s harder to get away from than a Big Issue ambush...It features a wandering street urchin whom critics have likened to Huck Finn and Holden Caulfield.” Most praised Banks’ for his likeness to Mark Twain’s Huckleberry Finn, comparing one of the characters in Huck Finn, Jim, to I-man, a middle-aged rastafarian who resembles Huck's companion. Others were not as pleased with the structure of Banks's novel. In the book review from The Nation's Jess Mowry states: “...Unfortunately [it's] jumbled together like The Hobbit gets Kidnapped by Peter Pan on Treasure Island.
