= Continental Drift (novel) =

1985 novel by Russell Banks

- First edition (publ. Harper & Row)
- Author: Russell Banks
- Language: English
- Publisher: Harper & Row
- Publication date: 1985
- Publication place: United States
- Media type: Print
- Pages: 421

Continental Drift is a 1985 novel by Russell Banks. Set in the early 1980s, it follows two plots, through which Banks explores the relationship between apparently distant people drawn together in the world under globalization, which Banks compares to the geologic phenomenon of continental drift. The first plot features Bob DuBois, a working class New Englander who heads to Florida in the hopes of striking it rich; the second plot traces the journey of Vanise Dorsinville from Haiti to Florida. It is an avowedly political work, whose stated aim is to "destroy the world as it is." It was published at the same time as Ronald Reagan cracked down on Haitian immigration to the United States.

Despite its scope, it is according to critic Michiko Kakutani, "somehow, acutely personal." The book sold well (15,000 copies in hard cover, 100,000 in paperback) and was highly acclaimed by critics. After publishing Continental Drift, Banks won the Dos Passos Prize for Literature.
