= Affliction (1996 film) =

1996 film directed by Mark Hejnar

- Directed by: Mark Hejnar
- Starring: GG Allin; Mike Diana; Full Force Frank; Annie Sprinkle
- Release date: 1996
- Running time: 45 min.
- Country: United States
- Language: English

Affliction is a 1996 American documentary film directed by Mark Hejnar and starring GG Allin, Mike Diana, Full Force Frank, Annie Sprinkle.

== Cast ==
- GG Allin
- Mike Diana
- Full Force Frank
- Annie Sprinkle
