= Lost Memory of Skin =

2011 novel by Russell Banks

- The cover of the hardcover first edition, published by Ecco in 2011
- Author: Russell Banks
- Audio read by: Scott Shepherd
- Language: English
- Publisher: Ecco
- Publication date: 2011
- Publication place: United States
- Media type: Print
- Pages: 432 (first edition)
- ISBN: 9780061857638

Lost Memory of Skin is a 2011 novel by American author Russell Banks.

== Premise ==
The novel, written in the third person, concerns two primary characters: "the Kid," a 22-year-old sex offender living in a colony of other offenders beneath a bridge in the fictional city of Calusa that resembles Miami's former Julia Tuttle Causeway sex offender colony, and "The Professor," a morbidly obese sociologist who attempts to rehabilitate him. As the novel progresses, the Kid's path to redemption is challenged by tropical weather, police raids, and the Professor's own ambiguous dealings with the CIA and the Weathermen.

== Reception ==
Reviewers found Lost Memory of Skin to be a challenging work. Writing for The New York Times, Helen Schulman called the novel "proof that [Russell] Banks remains our premier chronicler of the doomed and forgotten American male, the desperate and the weak, men whose afflictions and antagonists may change over the years but whose fundamental struggle never does," though ultimately critiqued the novel as being "not wholly coherent" and criticized the character of the Professor as someone she "still couldn't completely make sense of." NPR's Maureen Corrigan called the Professor "a pointlessly distracting character—a cartoon glutton, a double or triple agent for some spy outfit," and called the novel "a disquieting story... that would have been even more powerful and more daring if he had told it straight, without subplots and second bananas." Kirkus praised the novel as being "[i]ntelligent, passionate and powerful," though called Banks's decision to focus on a largely sympathetic sex offender "hedg[ing] his bets slightly."

In a 2012 interview with George Stroumboulopoulos, Banks revealed that an unnamed Hollywood director was interested in adapting the novel for film:

I just got an email from a director I really respect and admire who'd just finished the book and said, 'I wanna make this movie.' We'll see. I have a feeling getting that one financed is going to be really tricky. I think it'd be more easily done on... cable TV now. You can do more daring things—darker, more ambiguous stories—[on cable TV].

As of 2026, no film or television adaptation has been released.
