= Russell Banks =

American writer of fiction and poetry (1940–2023)

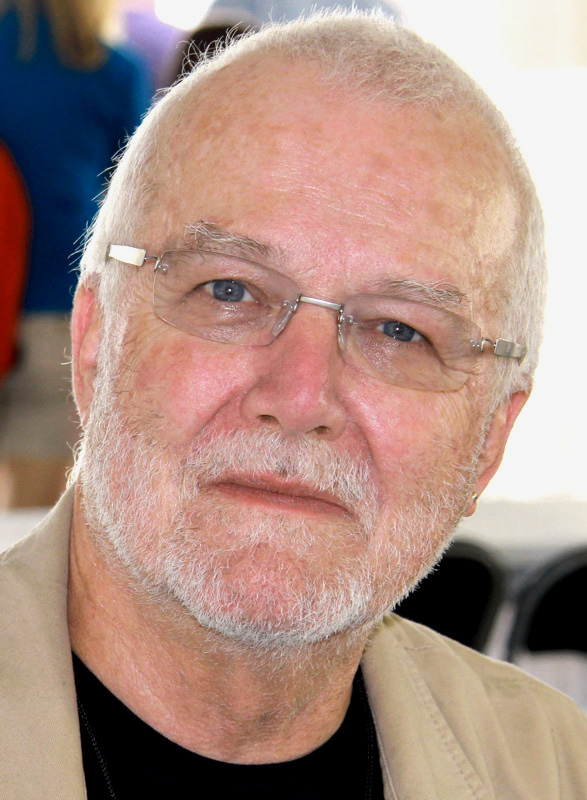
- Banks in 2011
- Born: March 28, 1940; Newton, Massachusetts, U.S.
- Died: January 8, 2023 (aged 82); Saratoga Springs, New York, U.S.
- Education: Colgate University; University of North Carolina, Chapel Hill (BA)
- Occupation: Writer
- Spouses: Darlene Bennett (divorced); Mary Gunst (m. 1963; div. 1977); Kathy Walton (m. 1982; div. 1988); Chase Twichell (m. 1989)
- Children: 4
- Writing career
- Notable works: Continental Drift, Affliction, Rule of the Bone, Cloudsplitter, The Darling, The Sweet Hereafter
- Banks's voice Banks talks about Lost Memory of Skin on Bookbits radio in 2011
- Website: www.russellbanks.com

Russell Earl Banks (March 28, 1940 – January 8, 2023) was an American writer of fiction and poetry. His novels are known for "detailed accounts of domestic strife and the daily struggles of ordinary often-marginalized characters". He drew from his own childhood in the working class, but also from the larger world, such as his years in Jamaica. His novels often reflect "moral themes and personal relationships".

Banks was a member of the International Parliament of Writers and a member of the American Academy of Arts and Letters.

== Life and career ==
Russell Earl Banks was born in Newton, Massachusetts, on March 28, 1940, and grew up "in relative poverty." He was the son of Florence (née Taylor), a homemaker, and Earl Banks, a plumber, and was raised in Barnstead, New Hampshire. His father deserted the family when Banks was aged 12, making their survival even more difficult.

Awarded a scholarship to attend Colgate University, Banks dropped out six weeks into university and traveled south instead, with the "intention of joining Fidel Castro's insurgent army in Cuba, but wound up working in a department store in Lakeland, Florida".

He married Darlene Bennett, who was working as a sales clerk at the time. They had one daughter and later divorced.

According to an interview with The Independent, he started to write when he was living in Miami in the late 1950s. In a separate interview with The Paris Review, he said the writing came after his return to New England in 1964 and settling in Boston. He married Mary Gunst. They had three daughters together before getting divorced in 1977.

Supportive of his writing, the Gunst family paid for him to attend the University of North Carolina at Chapel Hill during their early marriage; he graduated in 1967. In Chapel Hill, Banks was involved in Students for a Democratic Society and protest during the Civil Rights Movement.

In 1976, he was awarded a Guggenheim Fellowship.

Several years after his divorce, Banks married Kathy Walton, an editor at Harper & Row, in 1982. They divorced in 1988. In the early 1980s, he started spending most of the year in Keene, New York, a town in the Adirondacks. In 1989, he married poet Chase Twichell. They were married until his death in 2023, often residing in a second home in Miami.

He taught creative writing at Princeton University. He was also Artist-in-Residence at the University of Maryland.

== Honors ==
Banks's works received high recognition through his career. He was the 1985 recipient of the John Dos Passos Prize for fiction. His novels Continental Drift and Cloudsplitter were finalists for the 1986 and 1999 Pulitzer Prize for Fiction, respectively.

Banks was elected a Fellow of the American Academy of Arts and Sciences in 1996.

He was a New York State Author for 2004–2006.

=== Death ===
Banks died from cancer at his home in Saratoga Springs, New York, on Sunday, January 8, 2023, at the age of 82.

== Works and themes ==
His work has been translated into twenty languages and has received numerous international prizes and awards. He wrote fiction, and, later, non-fiction, with Dreaming up America. His main works include the novels Continental Drift, Rule of the Bone, Cloudsplitter, The Sweet Hereafter, and Affliction. The latter two novels were each made into feature films in 1997 (see The Sweet Hereafter and Affliction). Many of Banks's works reflect his working-class upbringing. His stories often show people facing tragedy and downturns in everyday life, expressing sadness and self-doubt, but also showing resilience and strength in the face of their difficulties. Banks also wrote short stories, some of which appear in the collection The Angel on the Roof, as well as poetry.

Banks also lived in Jamaica. Interviewed in 1998 for The Paris Review, he stated that:

After living in Jamaica and writing The Book of Jamaica, I accepted that I was obliged, for example, to have African-American friends. I was obliged to address, deliberately, the overlapping social and racial contexts of my life. I'm a white man in a white-dominated, racialized society, therefore, if I want to I can live my whole life in a racial fantasy. Most white Americans do just that. Because we can. In a color-defined society we are invited to think that white is not a color. We are invited to fantasize, and we act accordingly.

The themes of Continental Drift (1985) include globalization and unrest in Haiti. His 2004 novel The Darling is largely set in Liberia and deals with the racial and political experience of the white American narrator.

Writing in the Journal of American Studies, Anthony Hutchison argues that, "[a]side from William Faulkner it is difficult to think of a white twentieth-century American writer who has negotiated the issue of race in as sustained, unflinching and intelligent a fashion as Russell Banks".

In 2023, it was confirmed that Paul Schrader would write and direct Oh, Canada, an adaptation of Banks's novel, Foregone, starring Richard Gere and Jacob Elordi.

=== Reception ===
According to Robert Faggen in The Paris Review, Banks's debut novel, Family Life, "was not a critical success". His next volume, a collection of short stories called Searching for Survivors, won Banks an O. Henry Award. A second collection of short stories, The New World, published in 1978, "received acclaim for its blending of historical and semi-autobiographical material".

Many have admired Banks's realistic writing, which often explores American social dilemmas and moral struggles. Reviewers have appreciated his portrayal of the working-class people struggling to overcome destructive relationships, poverty, drug abuse, and spiritual confusion. Scholars have variously compared his fiction to the works of Raymond Carver, Richard Ford, and Andre Dubus. Christine Benvenuto commented that "Banks writes with an intensely focused empathy and a compassionate sense of humor that help to keep readers, if not his characters, afloat through the misadventures and outright tragedies of his books."

He was briefly mentioned in philosopher Richard Rorty's 1996 future history essay "Fraternity Reigns" in The New York Times Magazine. Rorty referred to him as having written a 2021 novel, Trampling the Vineyards, describing it as "samizdat" because of the political repression envisioned in the philosopher's speculative essay.

In 2011, The Guardian's Tom Cox selected Cloudsplitter as one of his "overlooked classics of American literature".

== Awards and honors ==
- 1975 O. Henry Award
- 1985 Dos Passos Prize
- 1986 Pulitzer Prize for Fiction finalist, Continental Drift
- 1996 Fellow of the American Academy of Arts and Sciences
- 1998 Anisfield-Wolf Book Award
- 1999 Pulitzer Prize for Fiction finalist, Cloudsplitter
- 2004–2006 New York State Author
- 2008 Thornton Wilder Prize
- 2011 Commonwealth Award for Literature
- 2012 Andrew Carnegie Medal for Excellence in Fiction, shortlist, Lost Memory of Skin
- American Book Award
- Guggenheim Fellowship

== Works ==
Novels

- Family Life (1975)
- Hamilton Stark (1978)
- The Book of Jamaica (1980)
- The Relation of My Imprisonment (1983)
- Continental Drift (1985)
- Affliction (1989)
- The Sweet Hereafter (1991)
- Rule of the Bone (1995)
- Cloudsplitter (1998)
- The Darling (2004)
- The Reserve (2008)
- Lost Memory of Skin (2011)
- Foregone (2021)
- The Magic Kingdom (2022)

Story collections

- Searching for Survivors (1975)
- The New World (1978)
- Trailerpark (1981)
- Success Stories (1986)
- The Angel on the Roof: The Stories of Russell Banks (2000)
- A Permanent Member of the Family (2013)
- American Spirits (2024)

Poetry

- Waiting to Freeze (1969)
- Snow (1974)

Nonfiction

- Invisible Stranger (1998)
- Dreaming Up America (2008)
- Voyager (2016)
