= John Brown Farm State Historic Site =

State historic site in New York, United States

- U.S. National Register of Historic Places
- U.S. National Historic Landmark
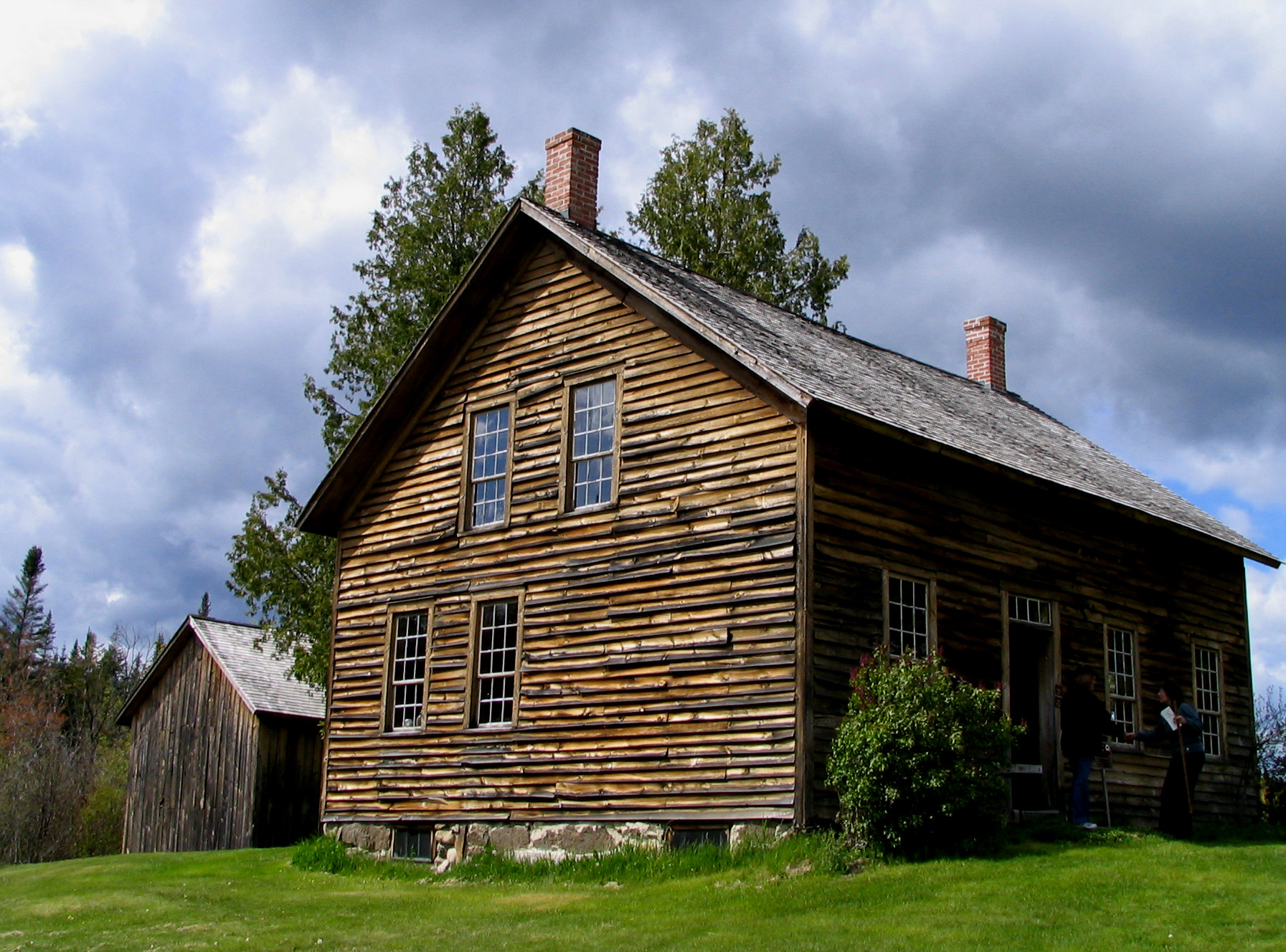
- John Brown's house

- Location within New York Location within the United States
- Nearest city: Lake Placid, New York
- Coordinates: 44°15′07″N 73°58′17″W
- Area: 270 acres (110 ha)
- Built: 1855
- NRHP reference No.: 72000840

Significant dates
- Added to NRHP: June 19, 1972
- Designated NHL: August 6, 1998

The John Brown Farm State Historic Site includes the home and final resting place of abolitionist John Brown (1800–1859). It is located on John Brown Road in the town of North Elba, 3 miles (5 km) southeast of Lake Placid, New York, where John Brown moved in 1849 to teach farming to African Americans. It has been called the highest farm in the state, "the highest arable spot of land in the State, if, indeed, soil so hard and sterile can be called arable."

According to a 1935 visitor, "the site which so captivated John Brown on his first visit and held his interest to the end of his life is one of the most impressive in the Adirondacks. The awe-inspiring mountains surrounding the spot look down on friendly valleys, lakes, hills, streams, homes, hamlets and villages. The panorama stresses the power, majesty and eternal verities embodied in the towering peaks; calls attention to the peace, grandeur and solitude of the region; and deepens the feeling of man's weakness, finiteness and transitory abode on mother earth."

A visiting reporter described the scenery as "absolutely the grandest in all the Adirondack region, being superior to that found at Mirror Lake and Lake Placid. ...A superb view."

It was declared a National Historic Landmark in 1998. It has been managed by the state since 1896; the grounds are open to the public on a year-round basis, and tours of the house are offered in the warmer months.

The weather was described at the time as "six months winter and the other six months was mighty cold weather". A recent (2002) writer called it "one of the most inhospitable places in the eastern United States".

== The Browns' first house in North Elba ==
When the Browns first came to the Adirondacks, in 1849, North Elba did not exist and the farmhouse had not yet been built. North Elba was separated from the town of Keene effective January 1, 1850.

John Brown rented a little house from "Cone" Flanders. His daughter Ruth described it in a letter:

The little house of Mr. Flanders, which was to be our home, was the second house we came to after crossing the mountain from Keene. It had one good-sized room below, which answered pretty well for kitchen, dining-room, and parlour; also a pantry and two bedrooms; and the chamber furnished space for four beds—so that whenever a stranger or wayfaring man entered our gate, he was not turned away.

The "chamber" was the unfinished attic, or second story. This small house sheltered a family of ten, one or more colored helpers, and occasional guests. The ten in the family were Brown and his wife Mary, five sons (Owen, Frederick, Watson, Salmon, and Oliver) and three daughters (Ruth, Annie, and Sarah). (His other sons, John Jr. and Jason were married and living separately.) They lived in this house for two years, until Brown moved his family and his cattle to Akron, Ohio, where he needed to be while winding up his wool business. The Flanders house burned in the first half of the 20th century.

John's cattle were exhibited at the Essex County Fair in 1850: "No incident of the Fair, however, was more exciting and grateful to Essex County than the, to most of us, unlooked-for advent of the splendid specimens of Devons. These most beautiful and noble animals are the property of Mr. John Brown, of North Elba, and as a single entry, triumphantly bore away the palm. Essex County is deeply indebted to Mr. Brown. While we acknowledge the succor the county derived from his exhibition in her friendly competition with Clinton [County], we trust his public spirit and enterprise will be appreciated and addquately rewarded." "Our readers cannot have forgotten the strong impression produced by the appearance at the recent Fair, of the magnificent [Devons] of Mr. Brown of North Elba. We are happy to Iearn that Mr. Brown, whose zeal and efficiency is most commendable, has, during the present autumn, added some fine animals to his herd. In justice to him we must remark that some of his more valuable stock was not exhibited at the Fair."

In 1855 Brown and his family moved back to North Elba and built the surviving home.

== A refuge for his family ==
Brown viewed the house he had built as a place not for himself—he lived there only 6 non-consecutive months—but for his wife and younger children, where they would be safe while he and his four oldest sons were in Kansas fighting slavery. According to a local historian, "besides the other inducements which this rough and bleak region offered him, he considered it a good refuge for his wife and younger children, when he should go on his campaign; a place where they would not only be safe and independent, but could live frugally, and both learn and practise those habits of thrifty industry which Brown thought indispensable in the training of children."

Actually running the farm in 1859 was John's son Salmon, aged 23.

== Description ==
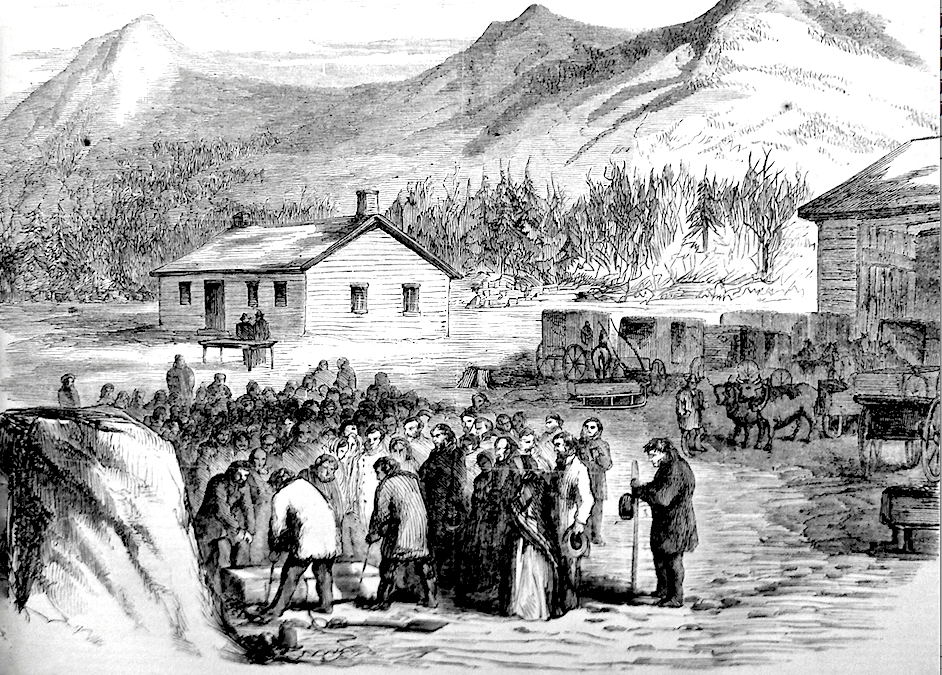
John Brown's burial, North Elba, New York, December 8, 1859. Note boulder at left.

Much is known about John Brown's farm as it was in 1859. A reporter from the New York Tribune and Thomas Nast, a sketch artist from the New York Illustrated News, were present at Brown's funeral. Rev. Joshua Young, who lost his pulpit (job) in Vermont for having presided over Brown's funeral, also left a lengthy description, and the farm was also described by a visitor to the widowed Mrs. Brown in 1861, and, slightly earlier, by Adirondack tourists who happened upon it.

The John Brown Farm, on John Brown Road (New York State Route 910M), is in the township of North Elba, south of the modern village of Lake Placid, which did not exist in 1859. It was about 2 miles (3.2 km) from the former hamlet of Black farmers at Timbuctoo, New York, whom Brown attempted to teach to farm. According to the deed, the property consisted of 214 acres (87 ha). The site today (2021) is 270 acres (110 ha) in size, of which the northern third houses the developed part of the site, with the balance in now reforested hills. However, a visitor to the widowed Mary Brown in 1861 described the property as "a circular patch of about 60 acres (24 ha), cleared in the midst of the primeval forest, covered over with blackened stumps, and devoted to grass, buckwheat, oats and potatoes." About 1860, Salmon Brown's potato harvest, which he sold to "the starch factory", was 4,500 US bushels (160,000 L; 36,000 US dry gal; 35,000 imp gal).

The developed area today (2021) includes John Brown's farmhouse and barn, the exhibit "Dreaming of Timbuctoo" permanently installed on the second floor of the barn, as well as a caretaker's house and other infrastructure for visitors. The house was described in 1859 as "a medium-sized frame building, such as is common in that part of the country. It has four rooms on the first floor, and corresponding space above." "It is a rude frame building, two stories high, and has anything but a pretentious appearance." The 1861 visitor called it a cabin, "which has recently received the addition of another room, and the logs of the building covered with clap-boards through the liberality of his Boston friends". "What! That humble unpainted farmhouse John Brown's home?" was the comment of Kate Field, who arranged the purchase and donation of the farm to New York State. A modern description is: "The house is a 2 1/2-story timber-framed structure, with a gable roof and clapboarded exterior. Its front is four bays wide, with the entrance in the left center bay, topped by a transom window. Most of the finishes, both interior and exterior, are restorations performed in the second half of the 20th century to bring about a c. 1860 appearance."

An 1859 visitor continued:

The next morning I had an opportunity, for the first time, of seeing the place as it appears in daylight, and of beholding the surrounding country. On opening the front door, a glorious sight saluted me [looking northeast]. Directly in front, apparently—perhaps from the thinness of the atmosphere—within two or three miles, but really much further off, looms up a rugged chain of the Adirondacks; broken, jagged[,] massive, and wonderfully picturesque. Off the left stands, in solitary grandeur, the towering pyramid called "White Face"—deriving its name from the color of the rock, on its summit. The Saranac and Ausable flow at each side of it; and just at its base, they tell us, is Lake Placid, a sheet of water famed through all this country of fine lakes for its exquisite beauty. On the right is to be seen, in the distance, the peak of McCreary Mountain; and on the right of that again, and still further on, M[a]cIntyre, the loftiest pinnacle of the Adirondack range, raises his towering crest. Just the country, my first thought was, for the heroic soul of John Brown, and a proper place, too, to be the receptacle of his ashes.

The family graveyard, which Mary Brown exempted from the sale, is now part of the site, encircled by a modern iron fence. A statue of John Brown by Joseph Pollia, placed in 1935, stands nearby. A 2002 visitor described the grave as "a chaotic memorial, a riot of symbol and meaning."

== History ==
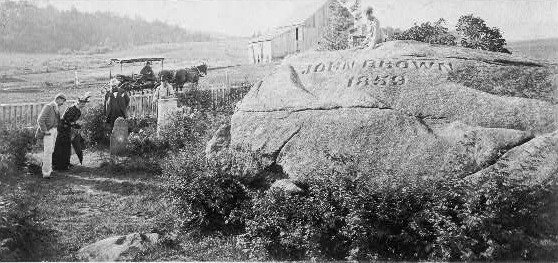
John Brown's grave, 1896. Note the figure atop the stone: speakers at the funeral spoke from there.

John Brown arrived in upstate New York as part of a project funded by Gerrit Smith to assist Blacks in becoming property owners and thus voters, under New York State law at the time. To this end he gave away hundreds of 40-acre (16 ha) tracts of Adirondack wilderness to be cleared and farmed. (See Timbuctoo, New York.) John Brown was financially ruined and had lost the family's home because of his disastrous 1849 business trip to England, meaning he could not repay the loans he had taken out to buy wool. Hearing on his return from England that Smith was giving away farms to Blacks, he traveled to Smith's home and asked for one, saying that his years in rural Pennsylvania showed that he knew how to clear land and build a farm, and organize a community. He agreed to teach these skills to the Blacks. He said that he had purchased the farm from Smith, and he had a deed registered at the county clerk in Elizabethtown, but he never paid Smith anything. The purchase was finally paid for by a collection among his friends.

The Timbuctoo experiment was a failure, as almost all the Blacks, save Lyman Epps, left within a few years; it was too cold and isolated, and clearing land and creating a farm is hard work. However, Brown himself did succeed in building a farm that could support his family.

The house was built by John Brown's son-in-law Henry Thompson "with his own hands". His wife was Brown's daughter Ruth.

=== Brown's funeral and burial, December 8, 1859 ===
After Brown's failed raid on Harpers Ferry and execution on December 2, 1859, his widow Mary brought his body back to his farm for burial, which took place December 8. Half of those present were Black, most formerly enslaved. Wendell Phillips spoke. John Brown's favorite hymn, "Blow ye the trumpets, blow!" was sung. The Unitarian minister conducting the service, Joshua Young, recited 2 Timothy 4:7–8 as the casket was put in the ground. Upon returning to Burlington, disapproval of his participation in Brown's funeral was so severe that he was forced to resign his pulpit, and his friends said that he had ruined his future, which turned out not to be true.

=== Memorial service, July 4, 1860 ===
Over 1,000 people were present at the farm on July 4, 1860, for a memorial service, including the surviving members of Brown's family, all but one (Tidd) of the surviving participants in Brown's raid, and hundreds of friends, including Thaddeus Hyatt. It was the last time Brown's traumatized family would gather together. None ever spoke publicly about him, and none of the many people who wrote of contact with Brown's survivors reports private conversations. The one who was most directly involved in the Harpers Ferry Raid, Owen, 12 years later, after repeated attempts by a journalist, told his story once. Salmon, shortly before he died, dictated to his daughter his recollections, which were incompletely published, and briefly told a journalist some of his recollections of his father. A 20th-century descendant of John Brown, Alice Keesey McCoy, said that within the family, he was not talked about, that there were feelings of shame. Brown's daughter Annie did not even tell her children "what Browns they were", because she felt it would hinder them to be known as John Brown's grandchildren.

=== Mary Brown sells the property to Alexis Hinckley ===
Funds collected from Brown followers for the support of Mary Brown, his widow, enabled her to add between 1860 and 1863 the addition with two windows on the right (removed during restoration).

Contrary to Brown's wish, none of his family would remain long at the North Elba farm. In 1860 his three oldest sons, John Jr, Jason, and Owen, were all living in Ohio. Salmon, who later remarked that the Brown family was "despised bitterly" and "our family was long buffeted from pillar to post," also departed, in his case for California. He was accompanied by his wife, children, mother Mary Brown, and sisters Sarah and Ellen, Mary seeking "a chance to start over in a 'new country". In 1863 Mary leased the farm to Alexis Hinckley, brother of Salmon's wife. In 1865 he purchased it from her, the grave site being exempted, for $800 (~$16,826 in 2025). It was with the proviso, added to the deed, that any interested party should be allowed to cross the property to access her husband's grave. Registers were kept so that visitors could write their name and any comments; Joshua Young left remarks in 1866.

=== Preserving the property ===
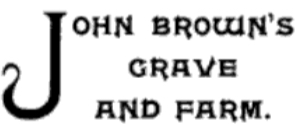
Kate Field's logo for John Brown's grave and farm

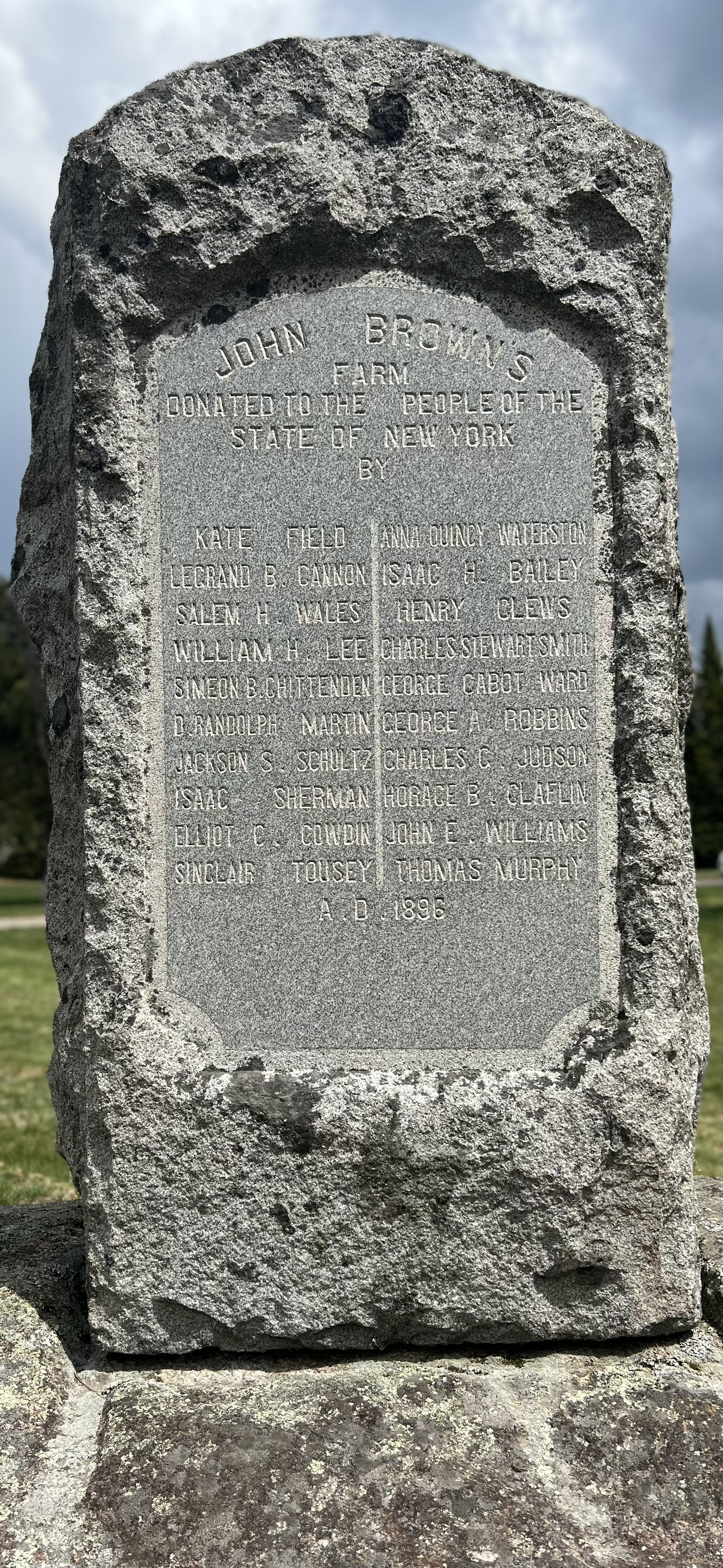
Monument to Kate Field and others who donated the property

Already in 1864 "many tourists, from various parts of the country, ...have made a pilgrimage..to the tomb of John Brown." In 1867, "nearly every day people from a distance visit this...shrine of John Brown, the martyr."

In 1870 Alexis Hinckley, described as a "thin, sad man", whose wife had died, wanted to move. (He turns up later in Pasadena, California, where some Brown family members—Ruth, Owen, and Jason—were.) He listed the farm for sale for $2,000 (equivalent to $50,921 in 2025). It was purchased by journalist Kate Field; a monument with her name and the other nineteen sponsors is displayed at the farm. She formed a John Brown Association to oversee the preservation of what she called "John Brown's Grave and Farm", and make it accessible to visitors. A history of Essex County published in 1885 reports that already there were hundreds of visitors to the grave every year. In 1892 it was "the Mecca of all tourists". By 1894, the cumulative number of visitors was said to have been "tens of thousands". It was given to the State of New York in 1896. In 1897, President McKinley was spending his summer in Plattsburgh, New York, and a special train to Lake Placid took him, Vice-President Hobart, Secretary of War Russell A. Alger, Secretary to the President John Addison Porter, and various Plattsburgh politicians, including Smith M. Weed, to the site for the dedication ceremony. John Brown's favorite hymn, "Blow ye the trumpet, blow", was sung.

== Graves ==
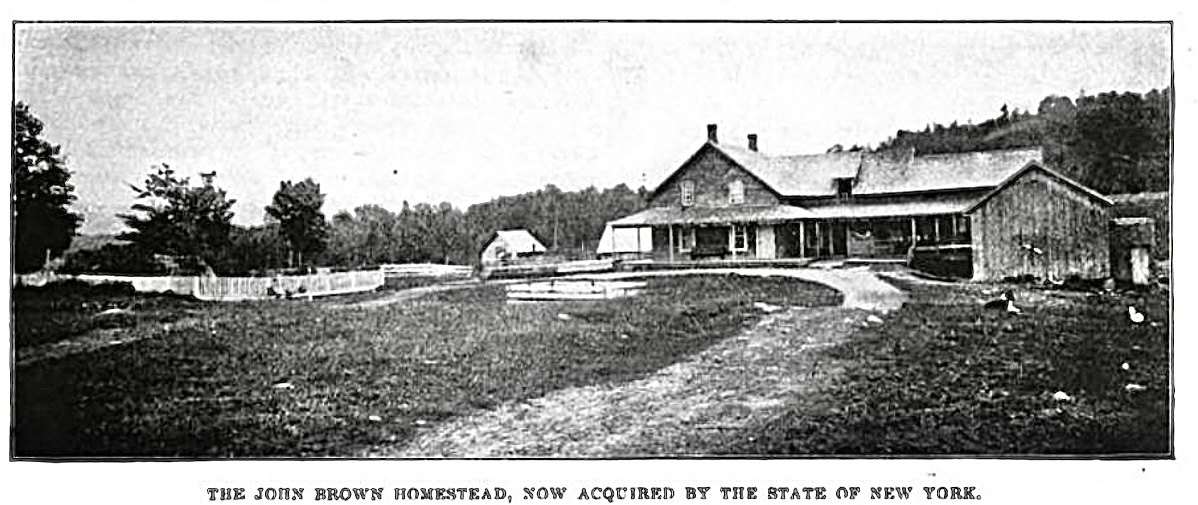
Brown's homestead in 1896, before its restoration

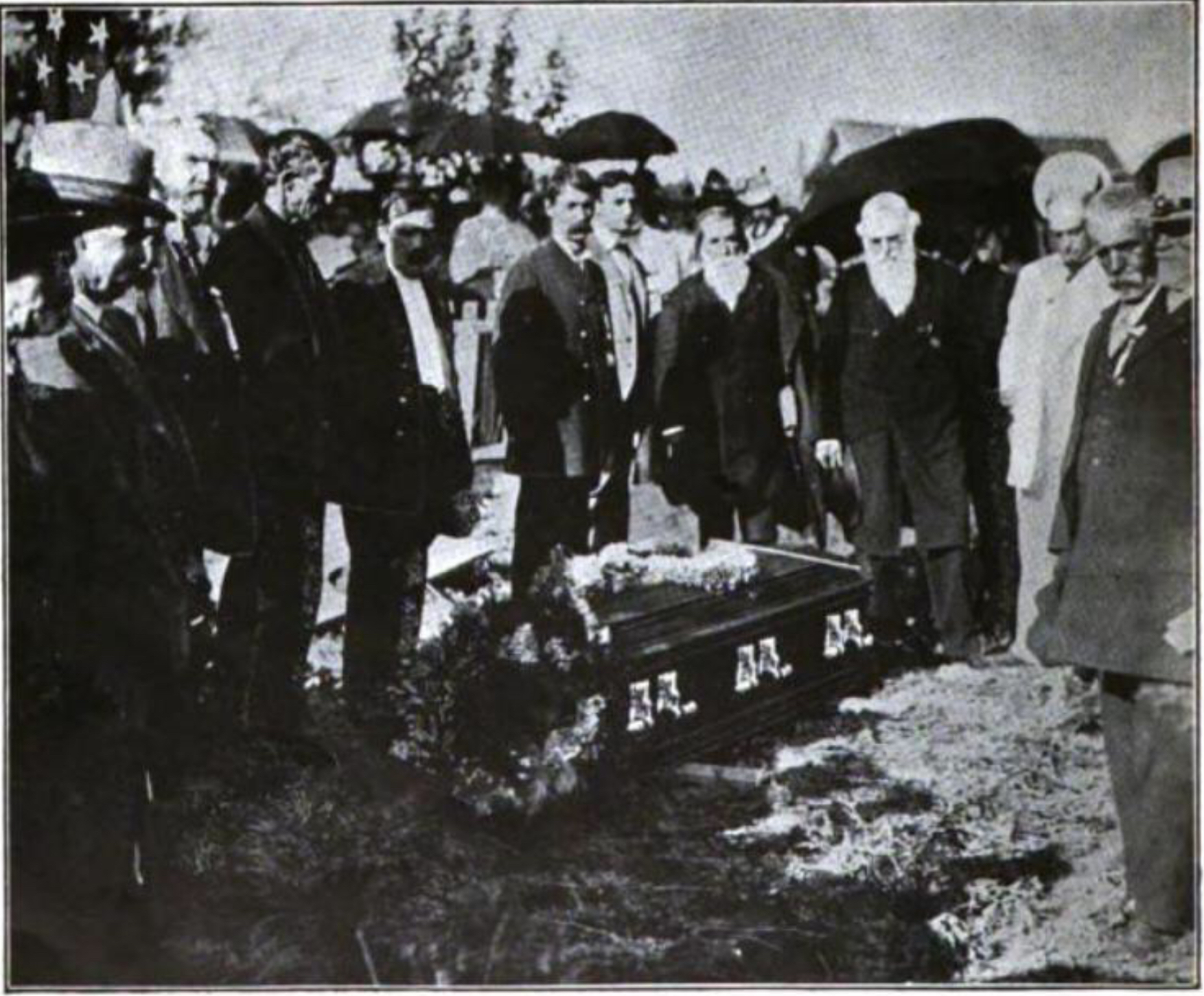
Rev. Joshua Young says the benediction over the reburial in 1899.

There have been three burials on the John Brown Farm:

1. John Brown himself, buried on December 8, 1859, immediately after his execution.
2. Watson Brown, one of John Brown's sons, died 1859, buried in 1882. His body was brought for burial by his mother; it was her first visit to the farm since leaving it in the early 1860s.
3. In a single coffin, since the condition of the remains did not permit better identification, the remains of 10 of the raiders, including son Oliver Brown, died or executed 1859–60, were reburied on August 30, 1899. The coffin was donated by the town of North Elba.

A cenotaph on the grave of John Brown was originally erected and inscribed for his grandfather, Capt. John Brown, who died September 5, 1776, while serving in the Continental Army. It originally sat at the elder Brown's gravesite in Connecticut. When it was replaced by a newer stone, the younger Brown moved it himself to his farm in New York. The younger Brown had an inscription written for his son Frederick after Frederick was killed by pro-slavery forces at the Pottawatomie massacre in 1856 and buried in Kansas, and then directed before his hanging that the names and epitaphs of his sons Oliver and Watson be inscribed alongside his own on the cenotaph. It has been encased in glass to protect it. There is no other tombstone, although two plaques were installed about 1899 (see John Brown's raiders#Raiders).

Kate Field, who is central to the site's history, had wanted to be buried here as well, but this met with local opposition, as did the erection of any monument to Brown other than the boulder.

== Modern activities ==
Beginning in 1922, the African-American members of the John Brown Memorial Association, based in Philadelphia, together with some local sympathetic whites, made an annual pilgrimage to Brown's farm and grave. In the early years especially, the Association would bring prominent speakers, such as attorney Clarence Darrow, Brown biographer Oswald Garrison Villard, and labor leader A. Philip Randolph.

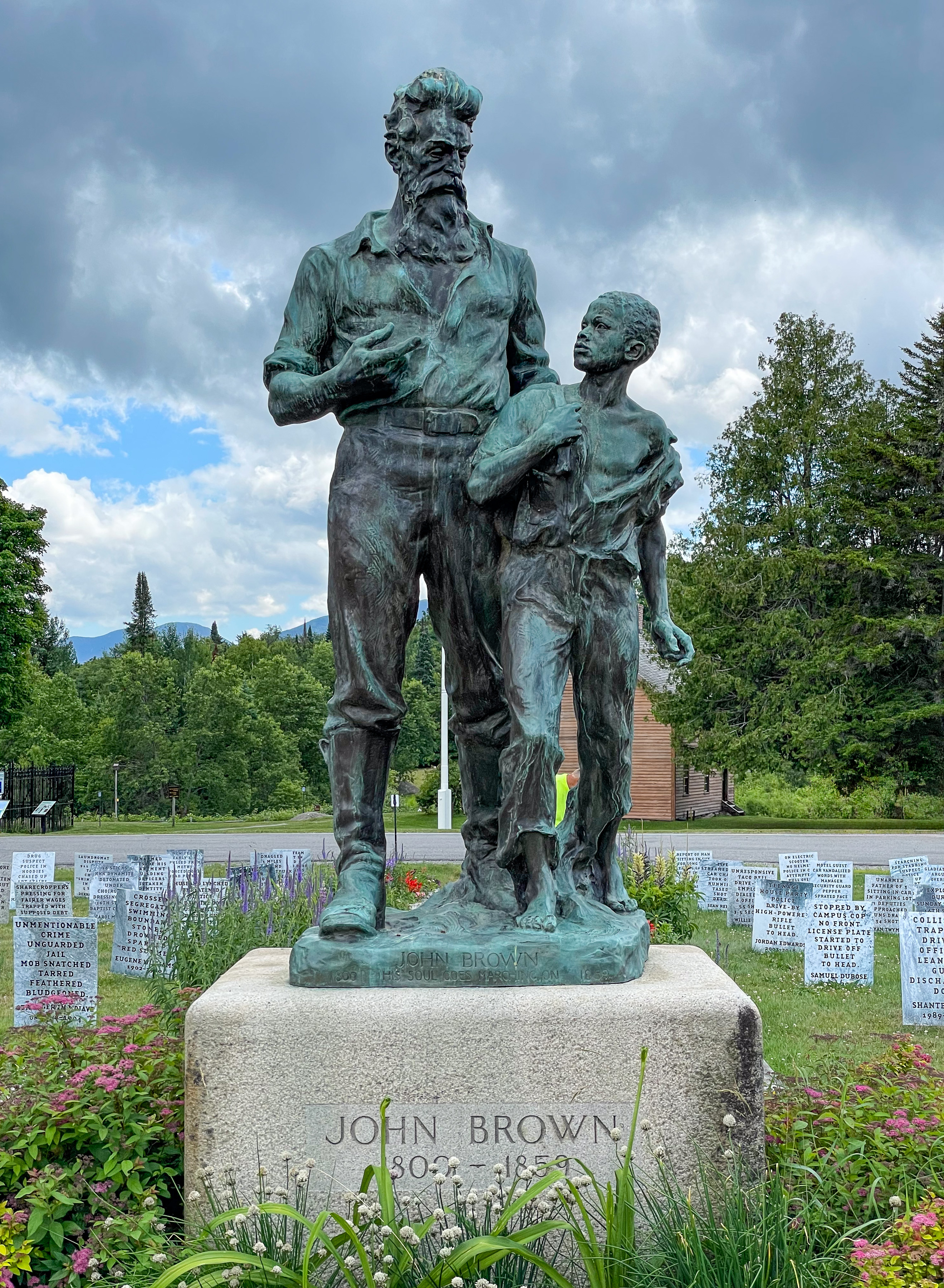
Statue by Pollia

In 1935 there was a full program of activities and speakers, centering on the new "impressive heroic-sized statue of John Brown befriending a Negro boy", by Joseph Pollia. The cost of the statue and pedestal "was contributed in small sums by Negroes of the United States". Unveiling was by Lyman Epps, Jr., a local celebrity, who was the only person present who had attended, as a boy, Brown's 1859 burial. The plinth is of Ausable granite; the cement foundation, landscaping, walks, and rustic fences were the result of work by the Civilian Conservation Corps) (CCC). Attendance was 2,000, including the mayor of Lake Placid, state historian Alexander C. Flick, and written greetings from Governor Lehman. A "colored quartet" from Lincoln University (Pennsylvania) sang. The Lake Placid Justice O. Bryan Brewster of the New York Supreme Court gave that evening what the press called an "impressive and masterful address" on John Brown. The Lake Placid Junior High School Glee Club sang "John Brown's Body".

In 1946, the John Brown Memorial Association held its 24th annual pilgrimage and memorial.

After 1970, reports Amy Godine, the tone and goals of this annual pilgrimage shifted and softened, and failed to keep pace with the burgeoning civil rights movement. Attendance waned.

In 1978, plans to add an interpretative center, parking lot, picnic tables and benches, with five employees, were abandoned due to local opposition from the John Brown Memorial Association and from a descendant of Brown and owner of the grave.

In 1997 the John Brown Farm and Gravesite was nominated as a National Historic Landmark. In 1999, a new organization, John Brown Lives!, directed by Martha Swan, revived the celebration of John Brown Day at the farm.

At the 150th anniversary of the raid In 2009, a two-day symposium, "John Brown Comes Home", on the influence and reverberations of Brown's raid was held, using facilities in adjacent Lake Placid. Speakers included Bernadine Dohrn, whose relationship with her family has been said to have resembled John Brown's ("a similar history of personal unhappiness, alienation, and parental difficulties"), and a great-great-great-granddaughter of Brown.

An annual Blues at Timbuctoo festival is held at the John Brown Farm, presented by the organization John Brown Lives! Friends of Freedom. The festival is a combination of blues music and conversation around race relations. The festival was launched in 2015.

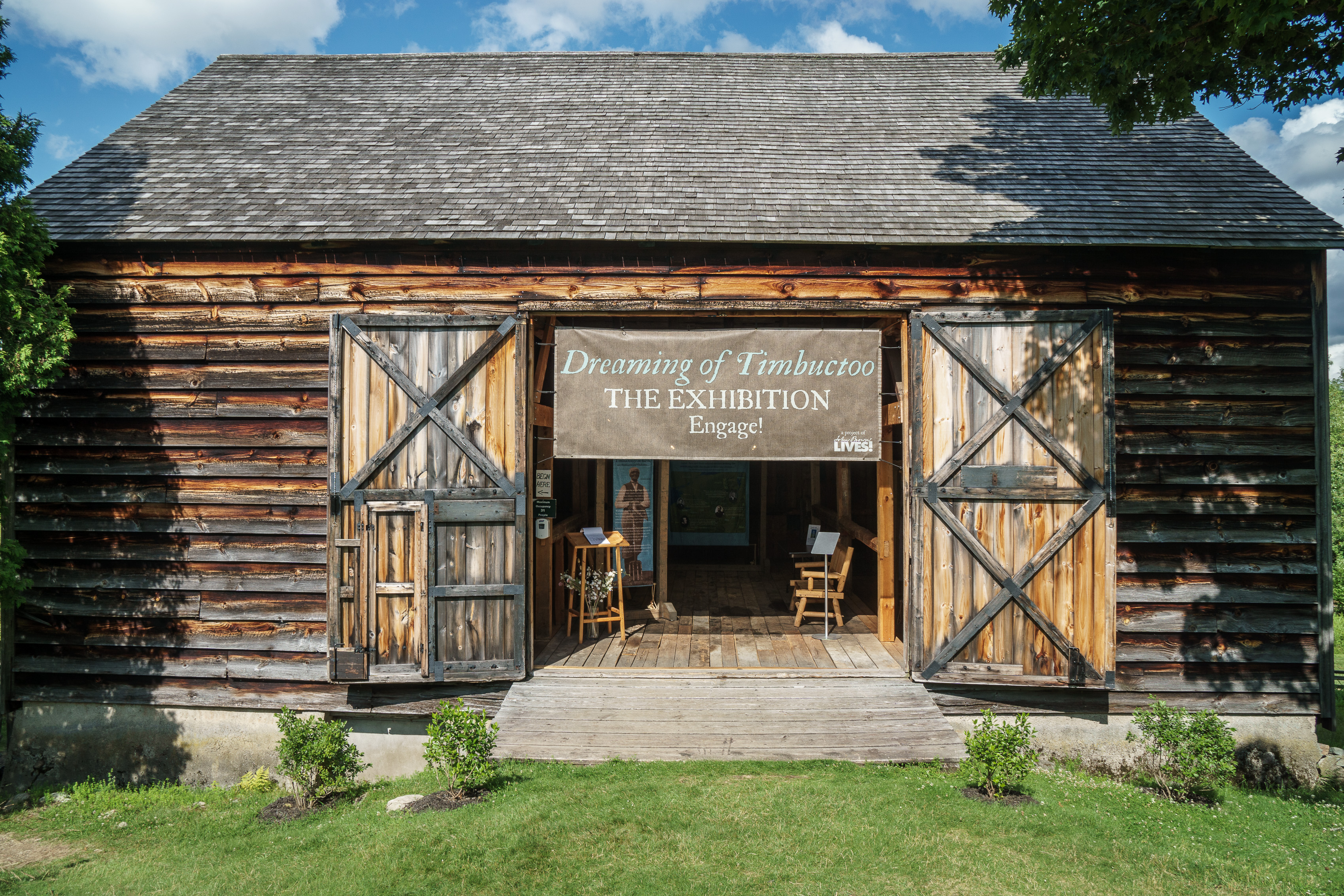
"Dreaming of Timbuctoo" exhibition

In 2016 the John Brown Farm State Historic Site became the permanent home of the "Dreaming of Timbuctoo" exhibition.

In 2017, the State University of New York at Potsdam held an archeology field school at the site, searching for artifacts linked to Brown.

== Gallery ==
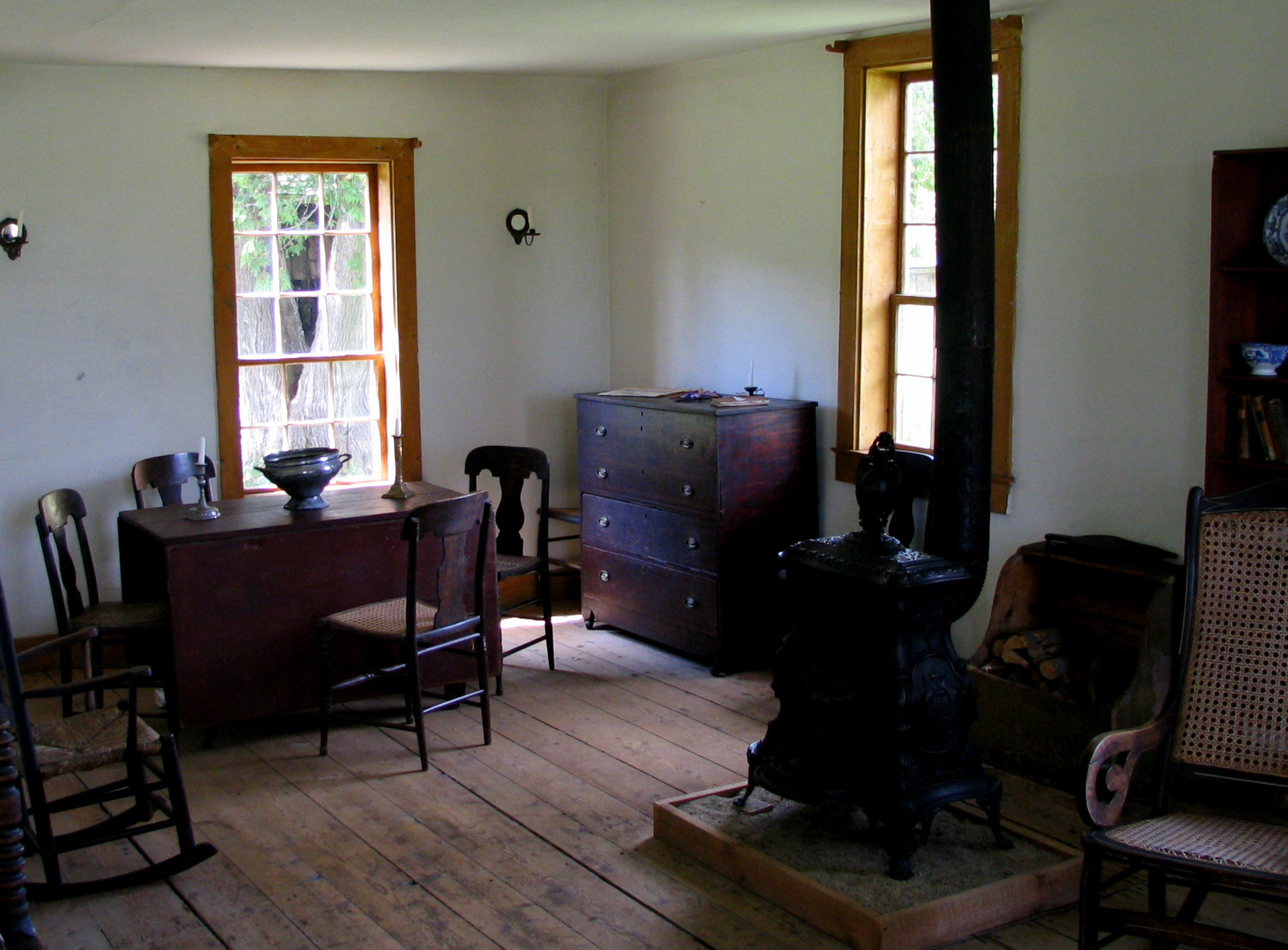
Parlor

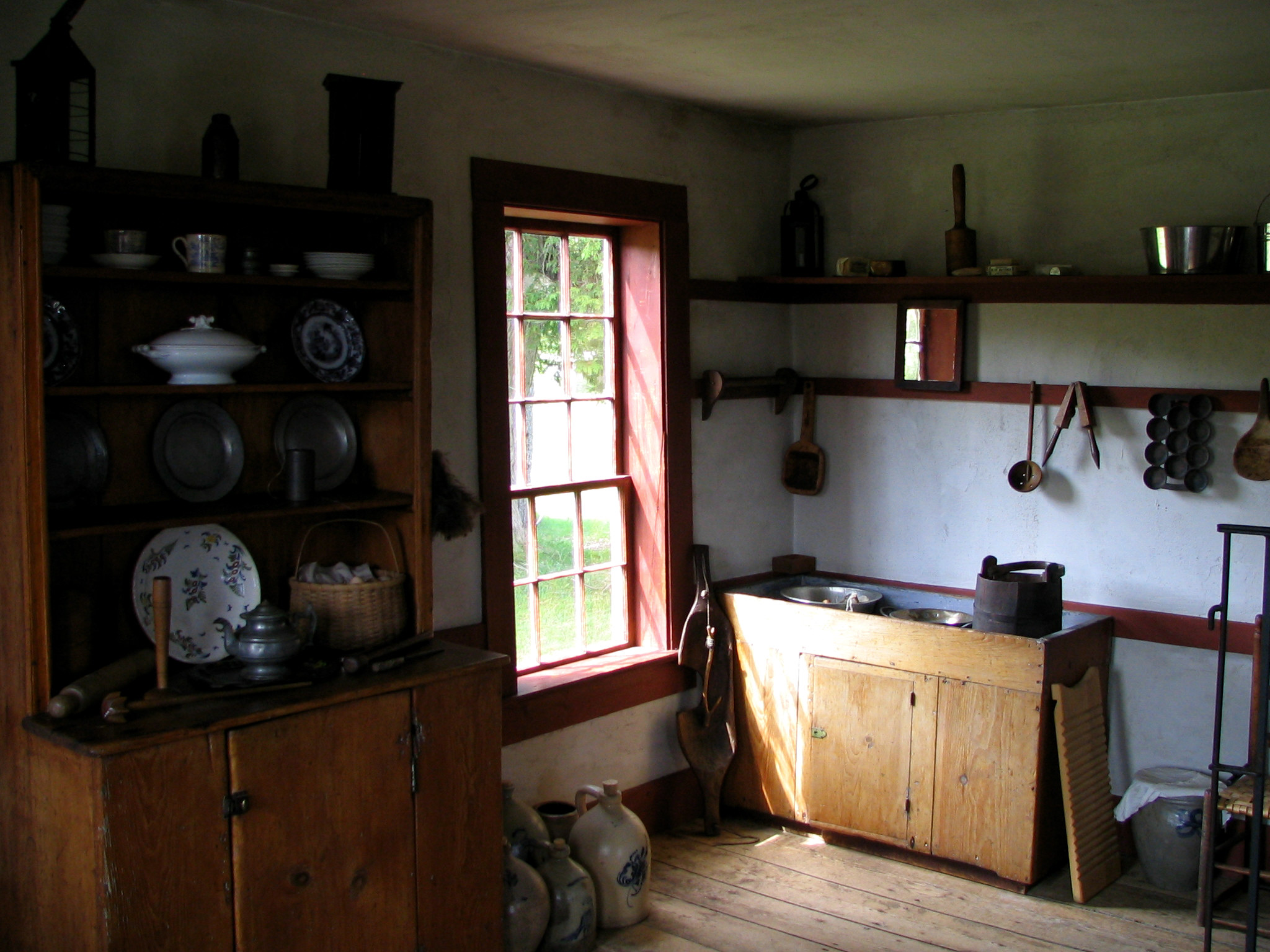
Kitchen

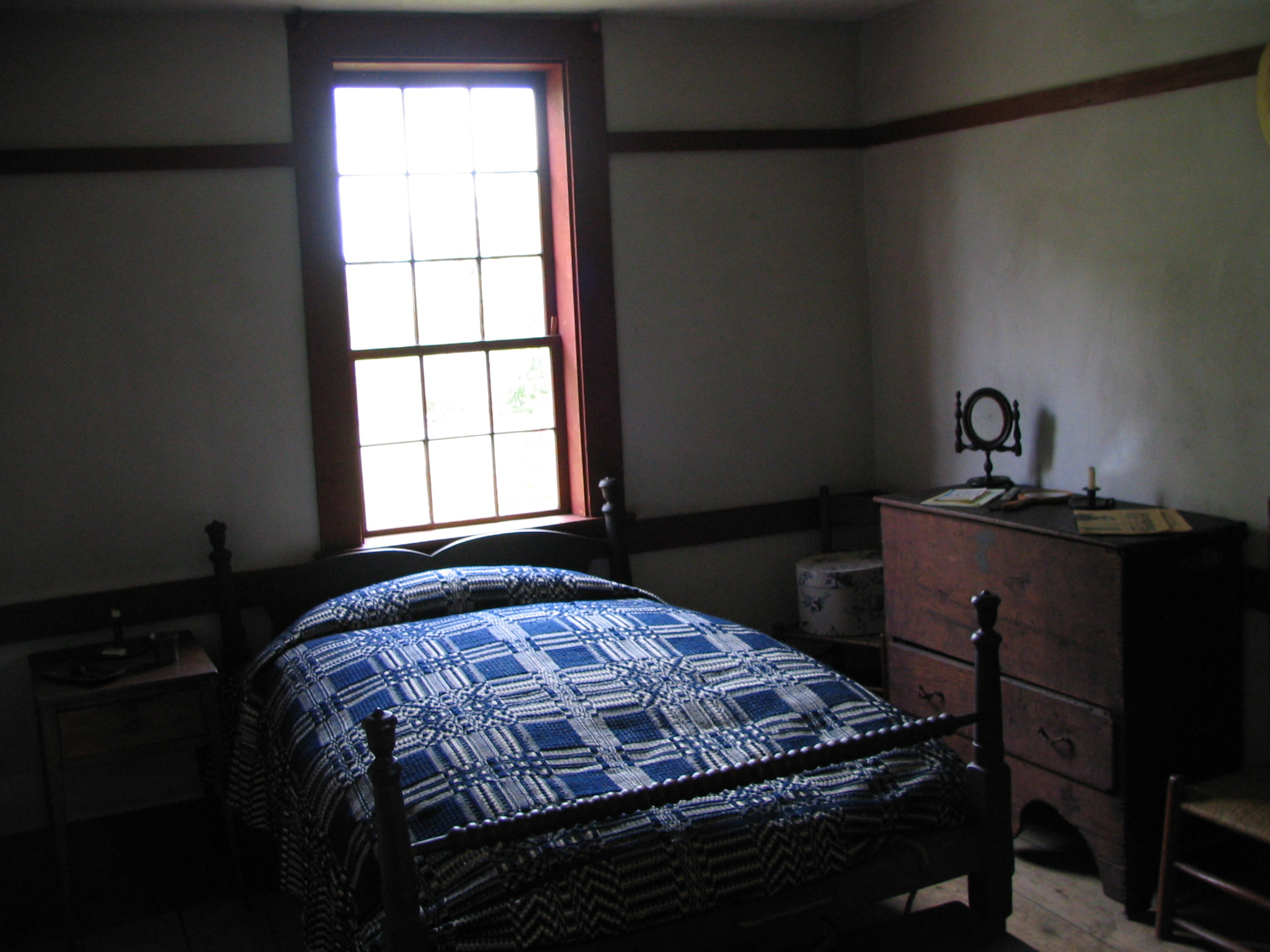
First floor bedroom

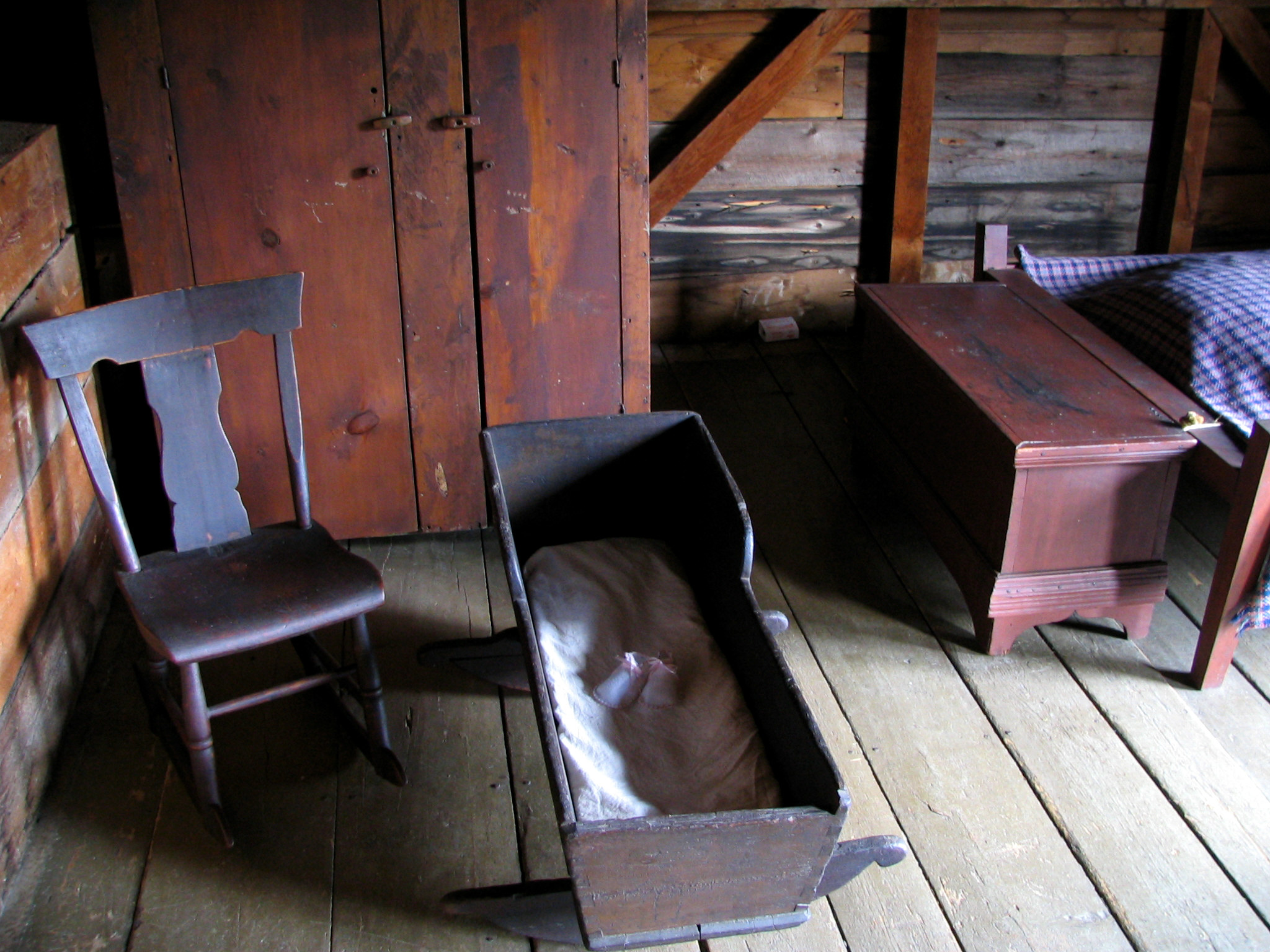
Second floor bedroom

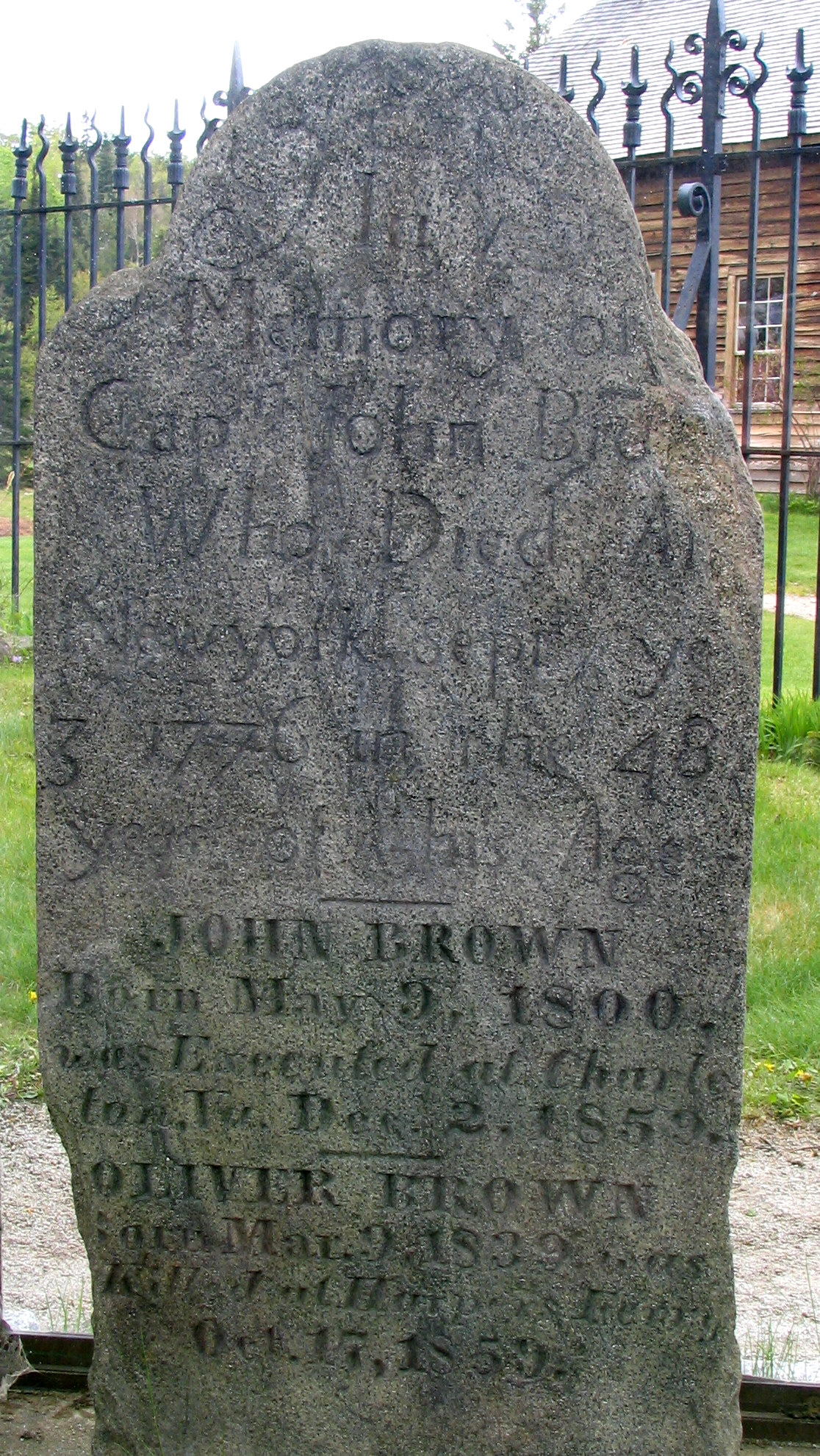
John Brown's tombstone, originally that of his grandfather John Brown, who fought in the American Revolution, moved here from the latter's Connecticut grave. Encased in glass (see the bottom).

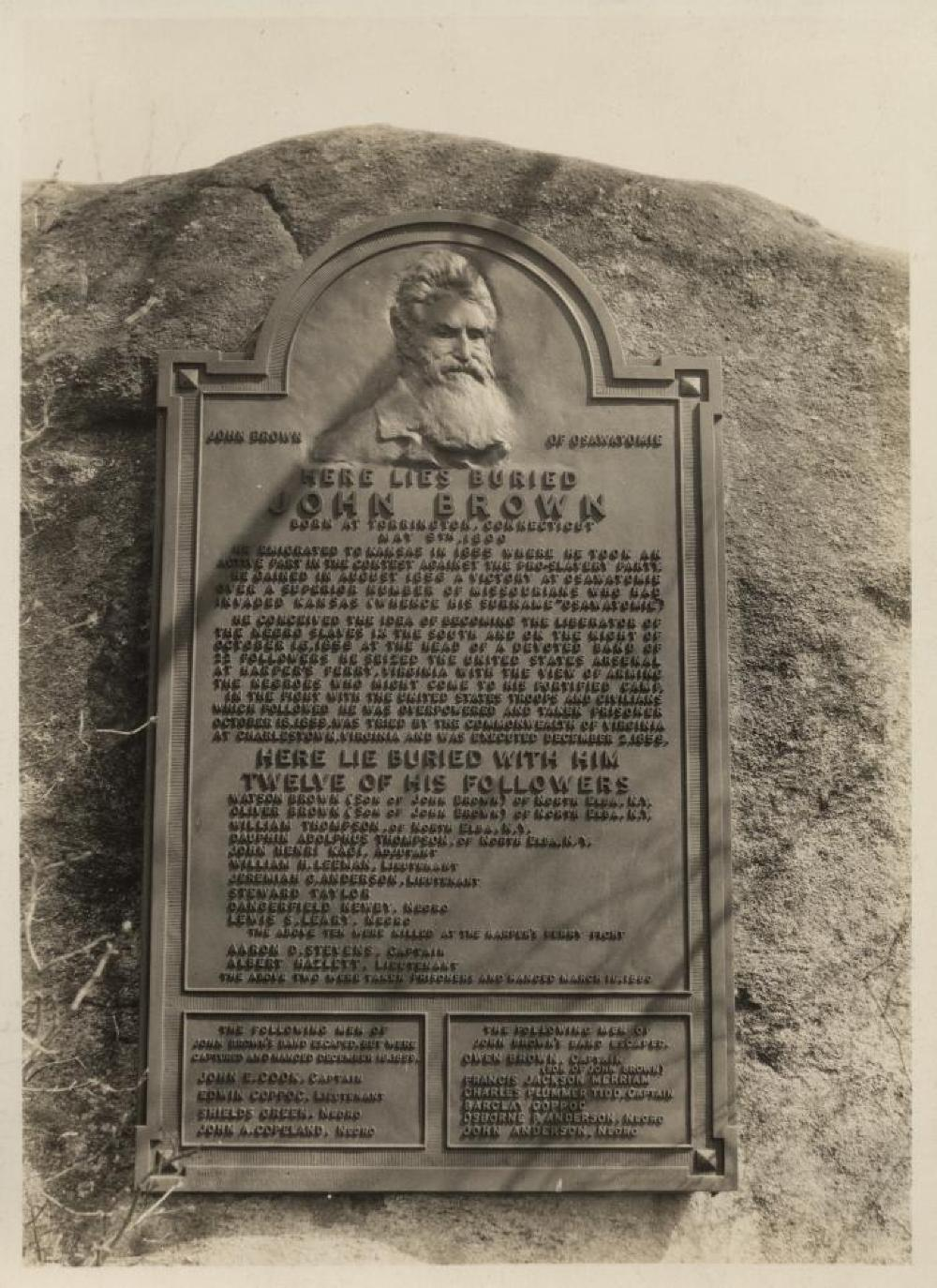
Plaque at John Brown's grave with names of others buried there. See John Brown's raiders for two errors.

== See also ==
- List of New York State Historic Sites
- List of National Historic Landmarks in New York
- List of reference routes in New York
- Timbuctoo, New York

== Further reading (most recent first) ==
- Leslie, Naton (May–August 2002). "John Brown's Grave". North American Review. 287 (3/4): 74–77. JSTOR 25126805.
- "John Brown's Home Undergoes a Century of Change". Lake Placid News. February 22, 1968. p. 6 – via NYS Historic Newspapers.
- Lee, Mary (October 20, 1929). "John Brown Rests amid the Mountains. The Farm at North Elba Where His Body Lies Is Rich in Memories of Days When His Plans Were Maturing". New York Times. pp. 139, 147 (The New York Times Magazine, 7, 23).
- McClellan, Katherine Elizabeth (1896). A Hero's Grave in the Adirondacks. Saranac Lake, New York: The author.
- Gould, Elizabeth Porter (November 21, 1896). "John Brown at North Elba". The Outlook. 54 (11): 909–911.
