= Abby Norman (writer) =

American science writer

Abby M. Norman
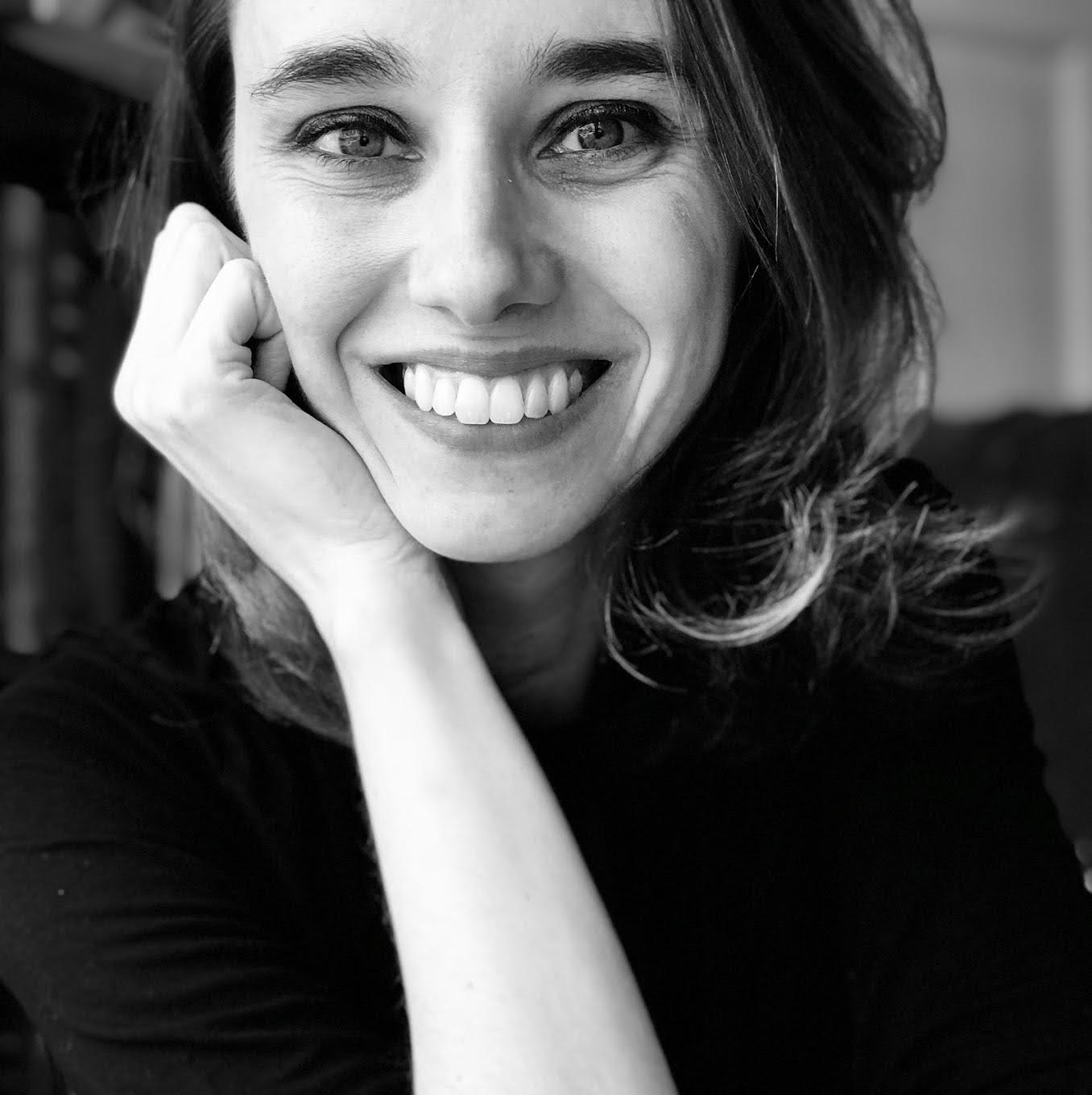
- Abby Norman in 2018
- Education: Sarah Lawrence College
- Writing career
- Notable work: Ask Me About My Uterus A Quest to Make Doctors Believe in Women's Pain
- Website: www.abbynormanwriter.com

Abby Norman is an American science writer. She is the author of the 2018 nonfiction book Ask Me About My Uterus: A Quest to Make Doctors Believe in Women's Pain.

== Biography ==
Norman had a troubled home life and became an emancipated minor at age 16. She attended Sarah Lawrence College but dropped out after experiencing severe pain that was eventually diagnosed as endometriosis. Norman wrote about her experience of endometriosis, including her efforts to get doctors to take her pain seriously, for Seventeen magazine, and started curating online essays on reproductive system health into a website called Ask Me About My Uterus.

In 2018 Norman's book Ask Me About My Uterus: A Quest to Make Doctors Believe in Women's Pain was published by Nation Books. The book connects Norman's personal experience to a longer history of medical practitioners dismissing women's pain, for example by treating their experience of pain as "hysteria". Ask Me About My Uterus also critically examines the popular understanding of endometriosis as a "white woman's disease".

Writing for The New York Times, Randi Epstein called Norman "a terrific storyteller with a gift for weaving memorable anecdotes" and noted that the book "tells a story that will resonate with anyone (man or woman) who has ever experienced pain". Kirkus Reviews described the book as "compelling and impressively researched" and "an unsparing look at the historically and culturally fraught relationship between women and their doctors". Erin Blakemore of The Washington Post summarized the book as "a torrent of disconcerting information about the continued struggle to understand and value women’s bodies".

Bustle named Norman as one of its 2018 Rule Breakers.

== Bibliography ==
- Ask Me About My Uterus: A Quest To Make Doctors Believe in Women's Pain (New York: Nation Books, 2018) ISBN 9781568585819
