= Tom Cox (writer) =

British author

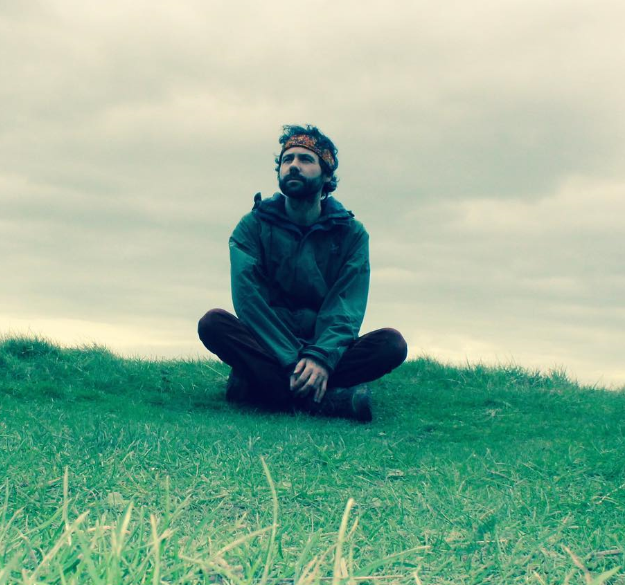
- Tom Cox on a cliff-top in East Devon
- Writing career
- Years active: 1999 - present
- Genres: Nature, Humour, Fiction, Folklore, Music, Golf
- Notable awards: Shirley Jackson Award 2018

Tom Cox is a Nottinghamshire-born British author who, as of 2026, has published sixteen books. Recurring themes in his writing include folklore, rambling, wildlife, psychedelic rock, cat ownership, local history, and golf.

== Biography ==
Cox began publishing a music fanzine as a teenager in the early 1990s, interviewing Ray Manzarek among others on his parents' home telephone. Between 1999 and 2000 he was the chief rock critic for The Guardian and wrote columns and features for other newspapers and magazines, before leaving print journalism in 2015 to write regular pieces about the countryside, folklore and many other subjects for his voluntary subscription website. During the 2000s and early 2010s he published a number of books about golfing, including Bring Me The Head Of Sergio Garcia, his account of his year as Britain's most inept golf professional, which was long listed for the William Hill Sports Book Of The Year award. Cox has also published several books about his cats, including The Sunday Times bestseller The Good, the Bad & the Furry, and until 2016 ran the Twitter account 'My Sad Cat', which featured pictures of his cat The Bear.

His book 21st Century Yokel, published in October 2017, is described as "a nature book, but not quite like any you will have read before" and was crowdfunded in seven hours by Unbound. The book details Cox's time living in Devon and Norfolk, as well as stories about his grandparents in Nottinghamshire and Derbyshire. The Guardian described it as "a rich, strange, oddly glorious brew" with elements of nature writing and memoir.

Cox's fiction debut Help the Witch, a collection of ghost stories, was also crowdfunded via Unbound and published in August 2018. Cox moved to a remote house near Eyam in Derbyshire to work on the book, and was unable to leave the house by car for several months during the so-called Beast from the East. This experience formed the basis of the title story, as well as Nearly Northern, a chapter in his next non-fiction book Ring the Hill (2019). The latter book is a successor to 21st Century Yokel and similarly features discursive anecdotes about rural life and rambling in Devon and Somerset.

Cox announced he was working on a full-length novel, Villager, in August 2020. The novel was successfully crowdfunded by Unbound and was published in 2022.

Cox's second novel 1983 was published by Unbound in 2024.

The publication of Cox's third novel, Everything Will Swallow You, was originally scheduled for March 2025 but was delayed as the original publisher, Unbound, went into administration in January of that year. The book was published by Swift Press in September 2025 to positive reviews.

In September 2026, Breakthrough Book Collective published Cox's second collection of short fiction, Curious Events Lately Occurring in This Neighbourhood. It was simultaneously published in paperback in the UK, and digital versions were released internationally.

== Bibliography ==
=== Non-Fiction ===
- Nice Jumper (Black Swan 2002)
- Educating Peter (Black Swan 2003)
- The Lost Tribes of Pop (Piatkus 2006)
- Bring Me The Head Of Sergio Garcia (Yellow Jersey Press 2007)
- Under the Paw (Simon & Schuster 2008)
- Talk to the Tail (Simon & Schuster 2011)
- The Good, the Bad and the Furry (Sphere 2013)
- Close Encounters of the Furred Kind (Sphere 2015)
- 21st Century Yokel (Unbound 2017)
- Ring The Hill (Unbound 2019)
- Notebook (Unbound 2021)

=== Fiction ===
- Help the Witch (Unbound 2018) - Winner of a Shirley Jackson Award
- Villager (Unbound 2022)
- 1983 (Unbound 2024)
- Everything Will Swallow You (Swift Press 2025)
- Curious Events Lately Occurring in This Neighbourhood (Breakthrough Books 2026)
