= John Brown's Fort =

Building in Harpers Ferry, West Virginia, US

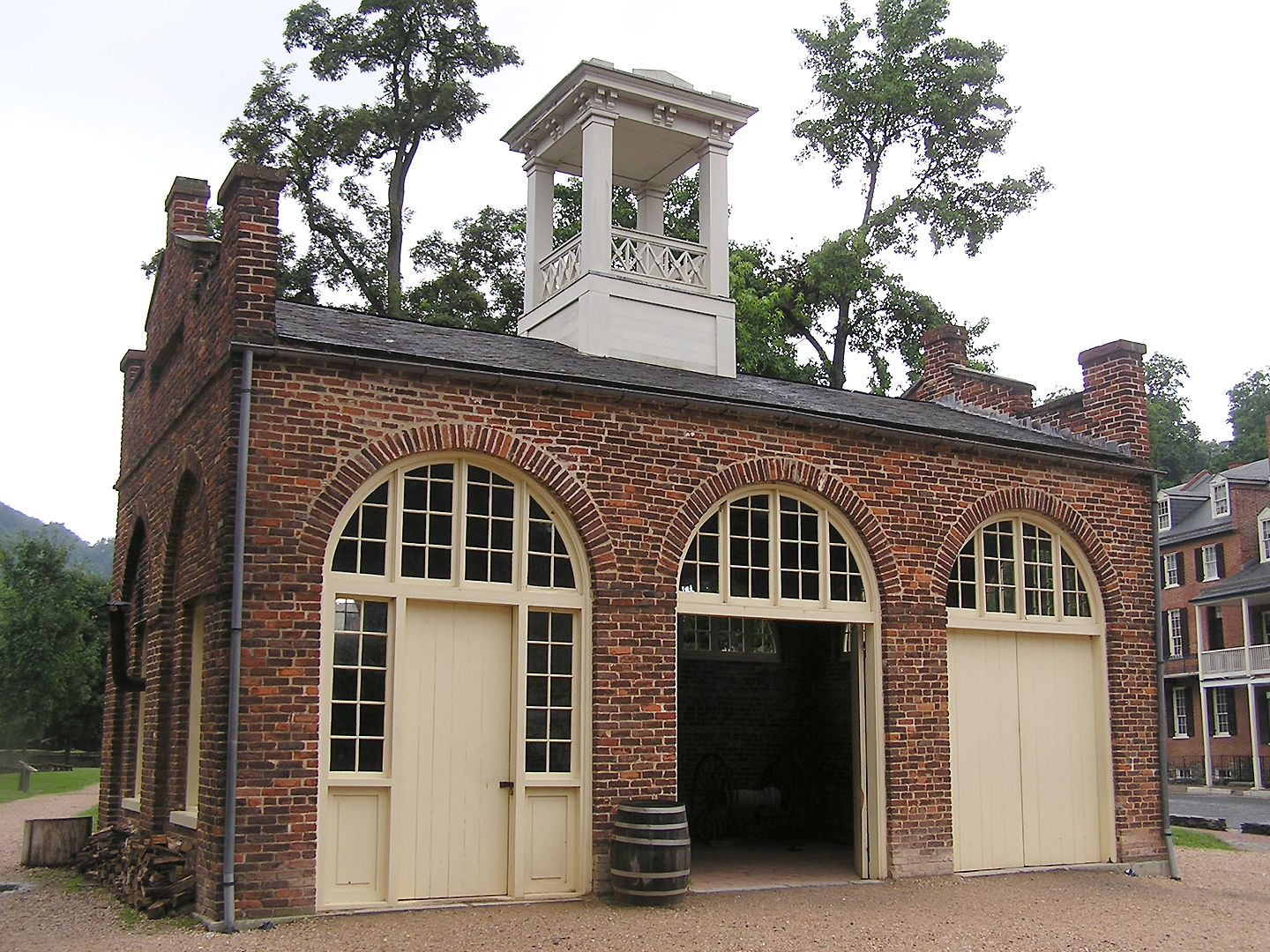
John Brown's Fort in 2013

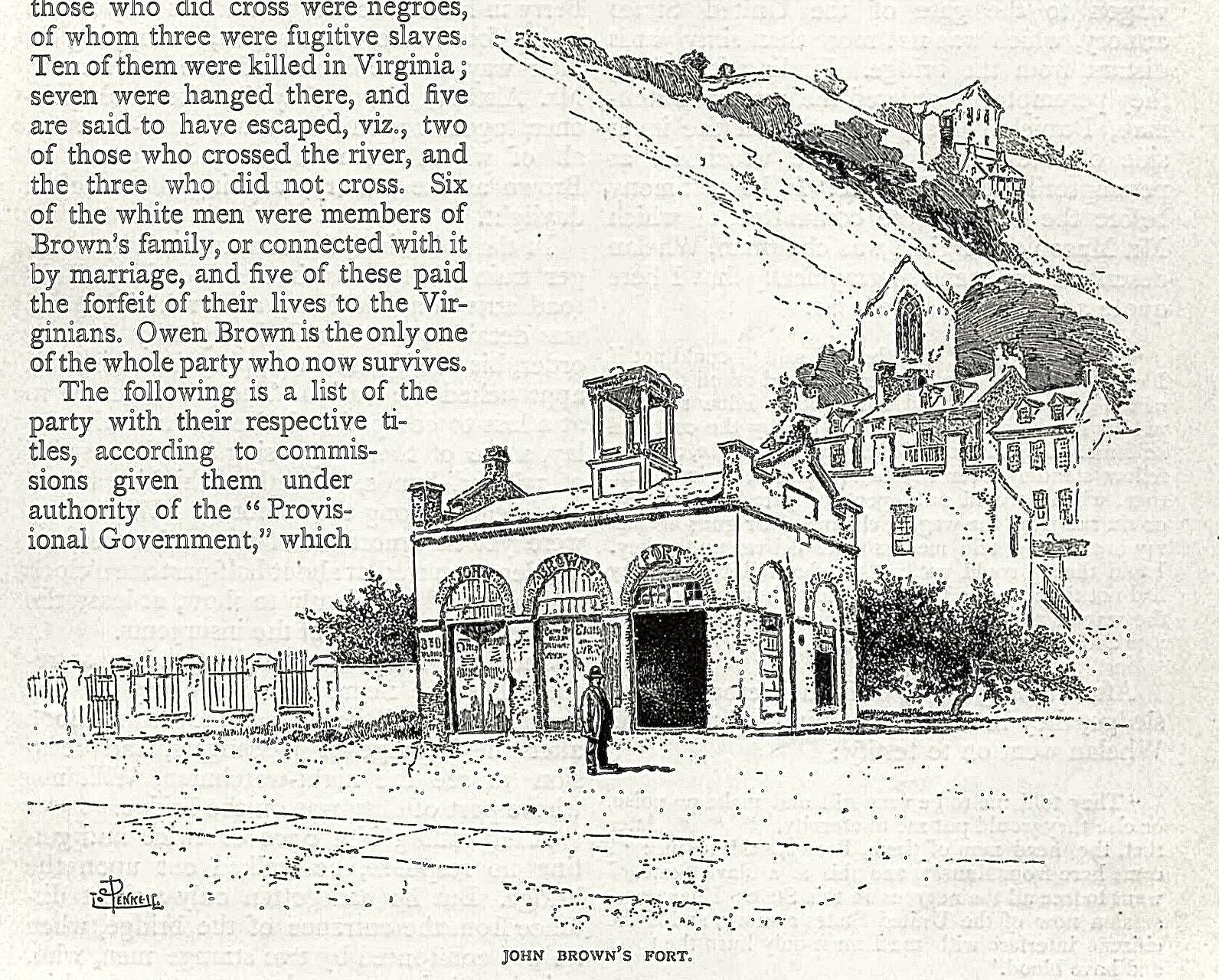
Drawing published in 1883. Note the words over the doors and the steep hill behind.

John Brown's Fort was initially built in 1848 for use as a guard and fire engine house by the federal Harpers Ferry Armory, in Harpers Ferry, Virginia (since 1863, West Virginia). An 1848 military report described the building as "An engine and guard-house 35 1/2 x 24 feet, one story brick, covered with slate, and having copper gutters and down spouts…"

The building achieved fame when it became the abolitionist John Brown's refuge during his 1859 raid on Harper's Ferry, in which he hoped to launch the overthrow of slavery. It is the only surviving building of the Armory; the others were destroyed during the Civil War.

The building quickly became a tourist attraction; the words John Brown's Fort—a new name—were painted over the three doors to attract tourists. It has been moved four times: in 1891 for the World's Columbian Exposition in Chicago, in 1895 to the Murphey Farm near Harpers Ferry, in 1909 to the campus of historically black Storer College in the upper town of Harpers Ferry, and in 1968 by the National Park Service to its present location in lower Harpers Ferry, near its original site. An obelisk stands where it was initially located. The building, obelisk, and Storer campus are all now part of the Harpers Ferry National Historical Park.

The fort is featured on West Virginia's America the Beautiful quarter.

== John Brown's raid ==
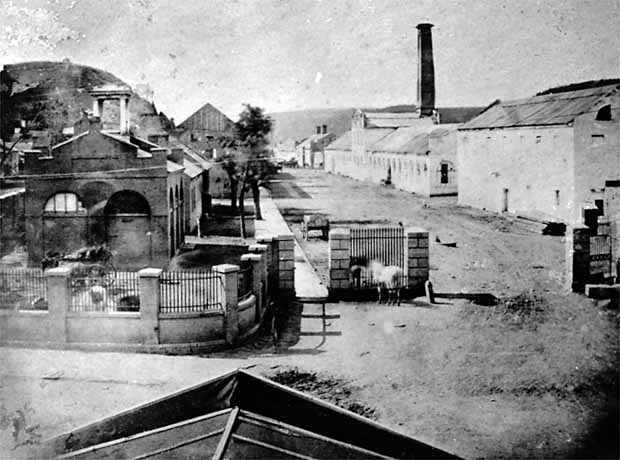
Harper's Ferry Armory in 1862, with the fire engine house on the left

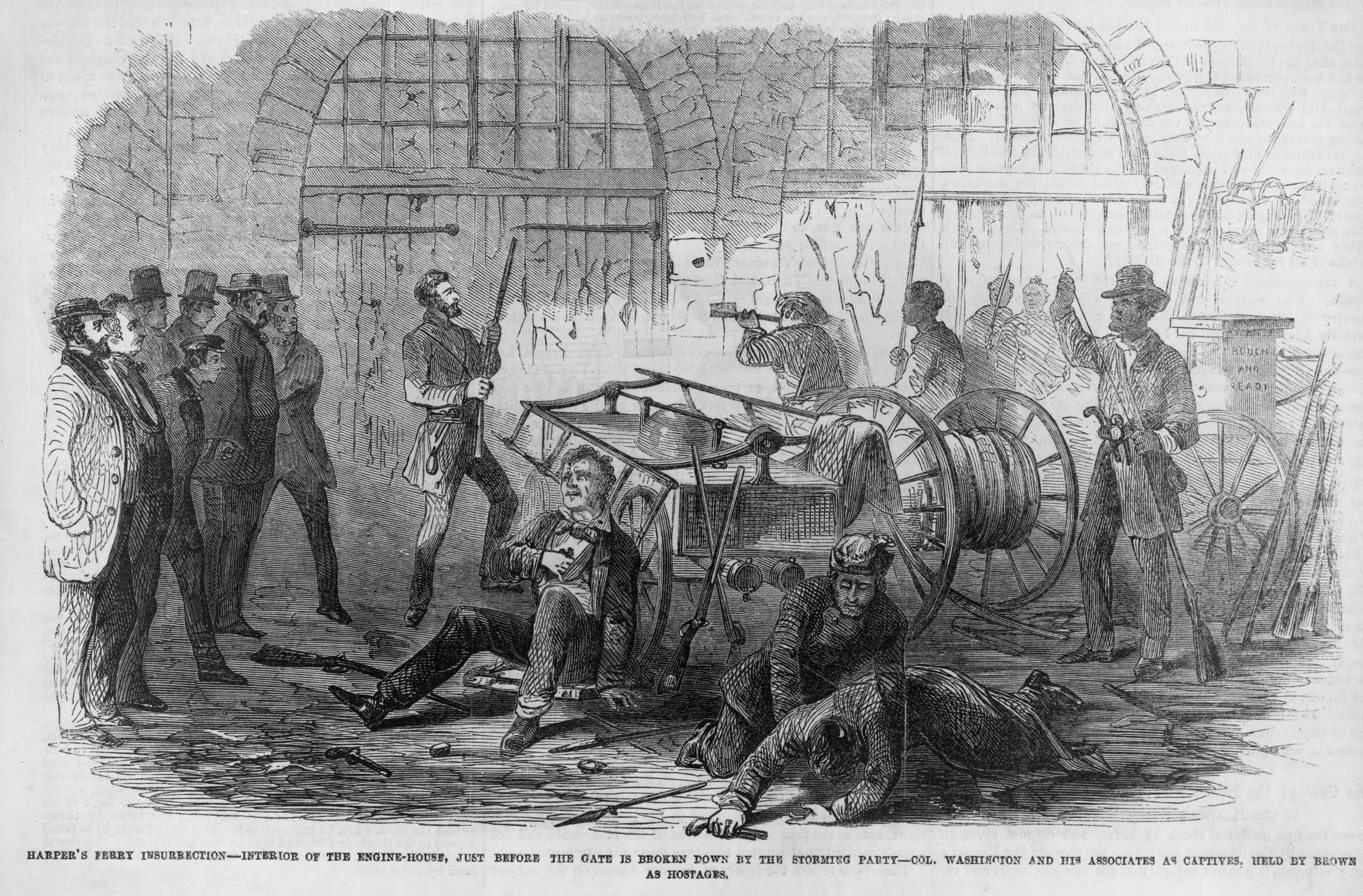
Illustration of the interior of the engine house immediately before the door is broken down. Note the hostages on the left.

John Brown planned to capture the armory and the associated arsenal and use them to supply an army of abolitionists and run-away slave guerrillas. Beginning their raid the night of October 16, Brown and his small army of 21 men (16 white and 5 black) captured the armory and arsenal and succeeded in taking 60 citizens of Harpers Ferry hostage. The local militia and armed townspeople killed several members of the insurrection. They forced Brown to take up a position in the sturdy fire engine house, where Brown's men had placed several hostages, and prepared to use the building for defense. On the night of October 17, U.S. Marines and then Brevet Colonel Robert E. Lee and his aide J.E.B. Stuart, at the instruction of President Buchanan, arrived in Harpers Ferry to put down Brown's insurrection. The next morning, using a ladder as a battering ram, the Marines broke down the door and stormed the fire engine house. One Marine and several of Brown's men were mortally wounded in the attack. Some of Brown's men managed to escape, but most were captured, including Brown, who was stabbed by the Marine commander, Lt. Green. The hostages were freed.

== After the raid ==
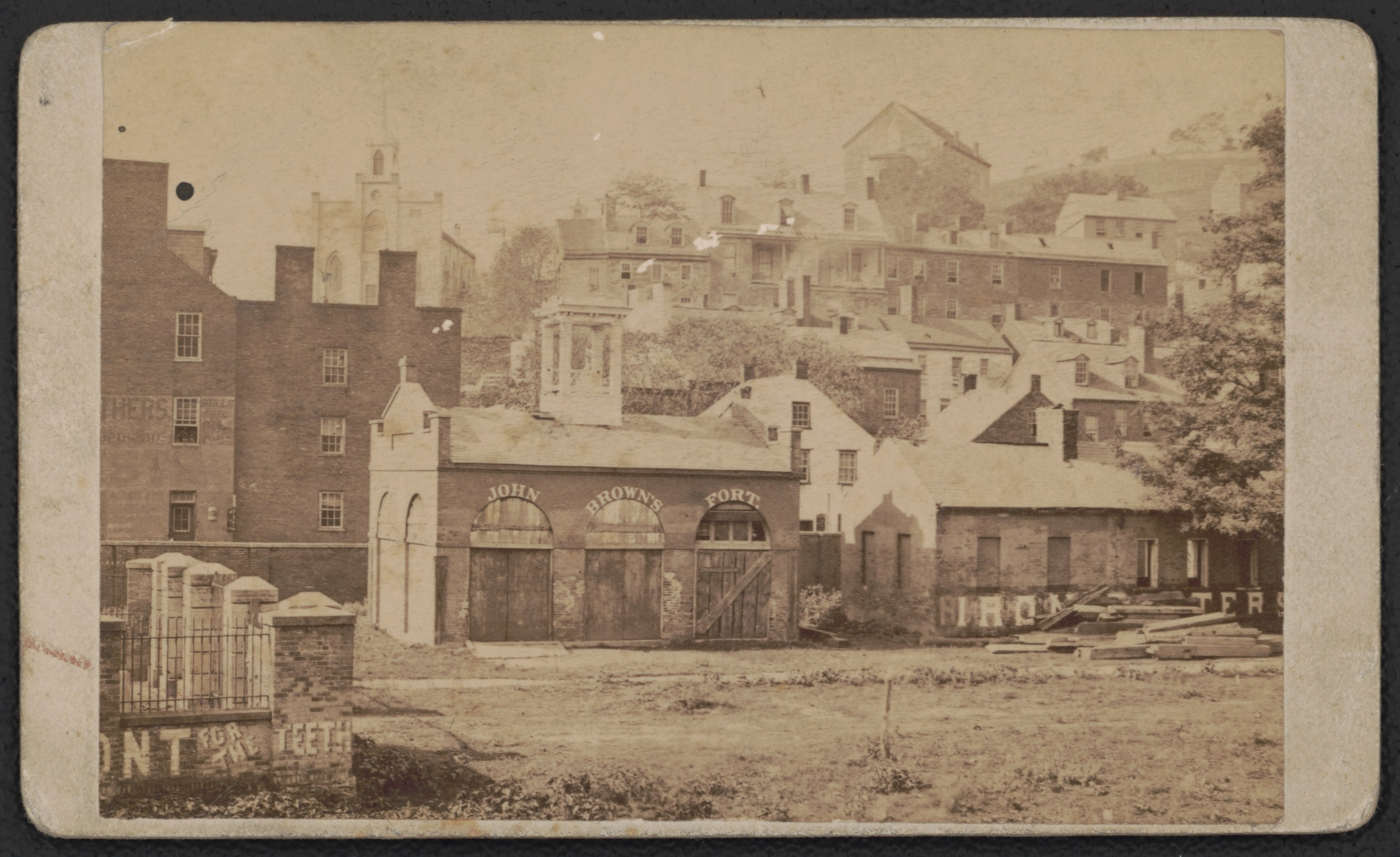
The engine house labeled "John Brown's Fort" to attract tourists, ca. 1885.

The engine house was the only part of the Harper's Ferry Armory still standing after the Civil War. There was much combat in and around Harpers Ferry, which changed hands several times during the war.

To attract tourists, who were primarily Black, the words "John Brown's Fort" were painted on the engine house. It "was a tourist destination—almost a shrine—for African Americans in the late nineteenth century." However, by 1882, it had fallen into a state of disrepair; the roof and windows were gone.

Many bricks were taken and/or sold as souvenirs; Frederick Douglass had one at his home in Washington. In the nineteenth-century, silver engravings of the Fort were attached to souvenir bricks; one is in the Park museum (see picture at right). Another was painted and given to an unnamed museum.

Some white townspeople, for whom Brown was a madman and traitor rather than a hero, were not happy having the structure in their town, nor the Black tourists it attracted.

== The four moves ==
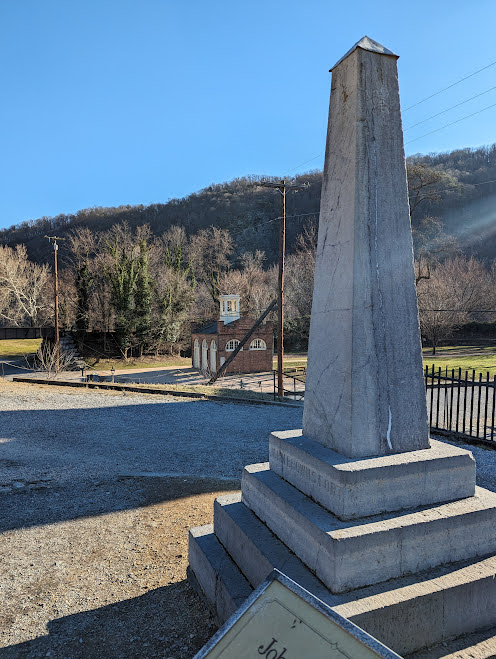
A view from the banks of the Potomac River; the original site of the fort is marked by the obelisk in the foreground, while the fort itself is presently 150 feet north.

=== Move to Chicago ===
To move its tracks to a less flood-prone location, the Baltimore and Ohio Railroad purchased the Fort and the land beneath it, intending to move or tear down the building. In 1891, the building was sold for $1,000 (equivalent to $35,833 in 2025) to a buyer who wished to use it as an attraction at the World's Columbian Exposition in Chicago (1st move), "but the venture proved a failure, simply because there was nothing which could connect the 'Brown Fort' with Chicago." The building was dismantled and abandoned on a vacant lot after the exhibition. Another report says it was used to store delivery wagons.

In 1894, a movement was spearheaded by Washington D.C. journalist Kate Field, who also helped save the John Brown Farm State Historic Site, to preserve the building and move it back to Harpers Ferry. It could not be moved back to its original location because the Baltimore and Ohio Railroad had covered it with an embankment in 1894, raising the rail line several feet to reduce the threat from flooding. The original location was marked in 1895 by the Baltimore and Ohio Railroad with a white stone obelisk. It stands 150 feet (46 m) from the present-day location of the fort and is also part of Harpers Ferry National Historic Park.

=== Return to vicinity of Harpers Ferry ===
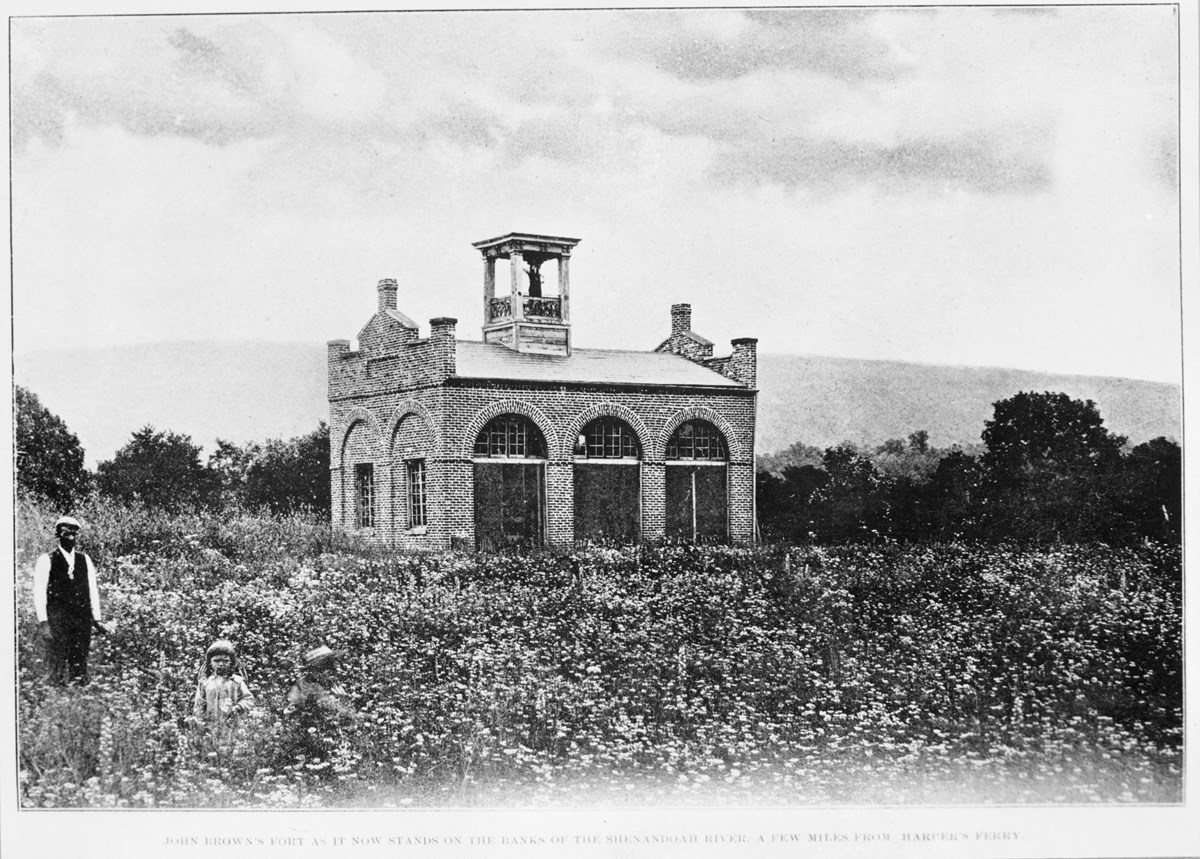
John Brown's Fort on the Murphy farm

The Baltimore and Ohio Railroad offered free shipping of the disassembled Fort back to Harpers Ferry (2nd move); they had lost ridership when the Fort was moved to Chicago. As a new site, Alexander and Mary Murphy offered 5 acres (20,000 m^{2}) of their farm about 2 miles (3 km) above Harpers Ferry; Storer College offered only 2 acres. Among the contributors to the funds raised for its disassembly and reconstruction were William McKinley, at that time Governor of Ohio, and Roswell P. Flower, Governor of New York. Reconstruction of John Brown's Fort on the Murphy farm was completed by November 1895 and included the gates that surrounded the fort. Eight thousand bricks were required to replace those that had been lost. While it was in that location, Murphy used it as a "barracks" and "to house a wheat crop".

The Murphy farm, originally established on September 1, 1869, was purchased by the National Park Service through the Trust for Public Land on December 31, 2002; it is now part of the Harpers Ferry National Historical Park.

The move of the Fort back to Harpers Ferry attracted African-American visitors, as the railroad hoped. The first national convention of the National League of Colored Women met in Washington, D.C., and took an excursion to Harpers Ferry to see John Brown's Fort.

Visitors reached a peak in 1906 when the first American meeting of the Niagara Movement—a predecessor of the NAACP, whose first meeting was held in Fort Erie, Ontario, Canada—was held in Harpers Ferry, at Storer College. Attendees held an on-site memorial for Brown called "John Brown Day" (August 17). Over one hundred prominent African-American men and women walked from Storer to the Fort's location, among them W.E.B. DuBois, Lewis Douglas, and W. T. Greener. The leader of the procession, a physician from Brooklyn named Owen Waller, "took off his shoes and socks and walked barefoot as if he were treading on holy ground". Marching to a Monument for Freedom, painting by Richard Fitzhugh.

=== Move to Storer College ===
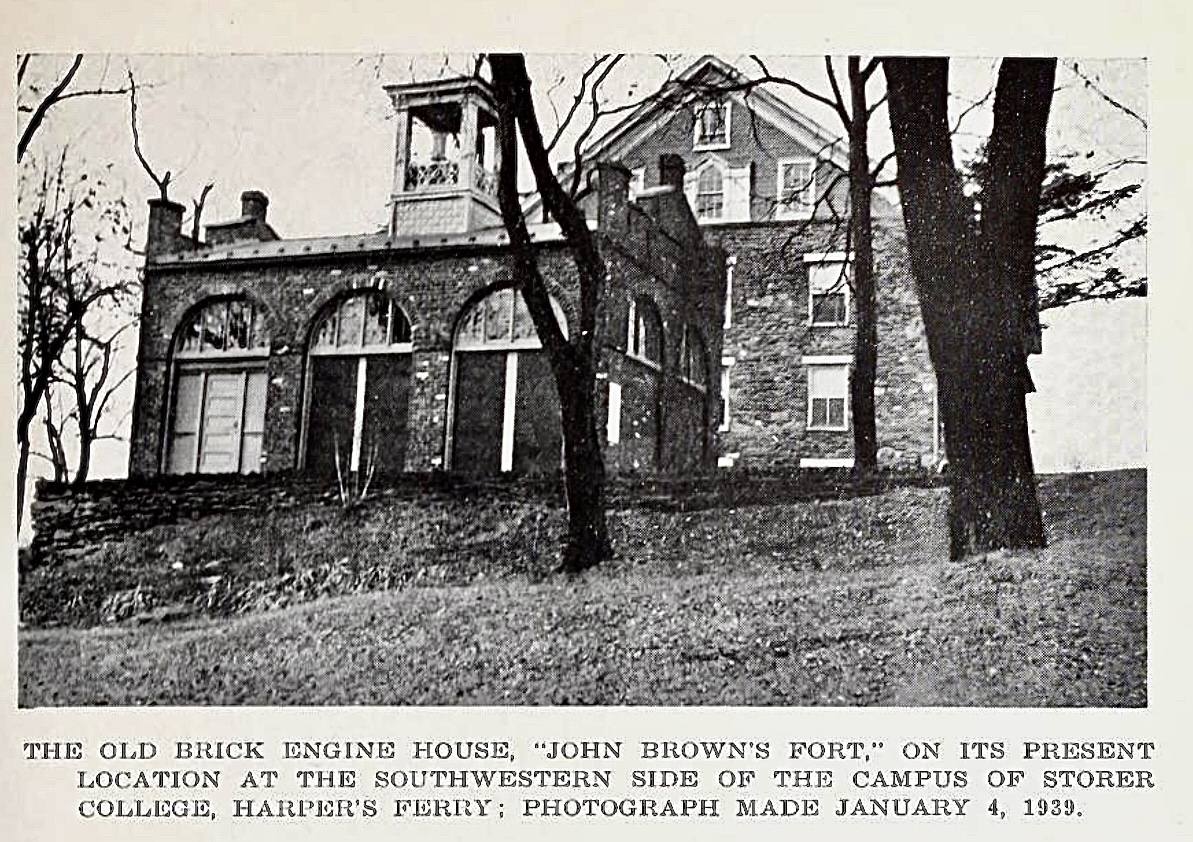
John Brown's Fort, on the Storer College campus. Behind it is Lincoln Hall.

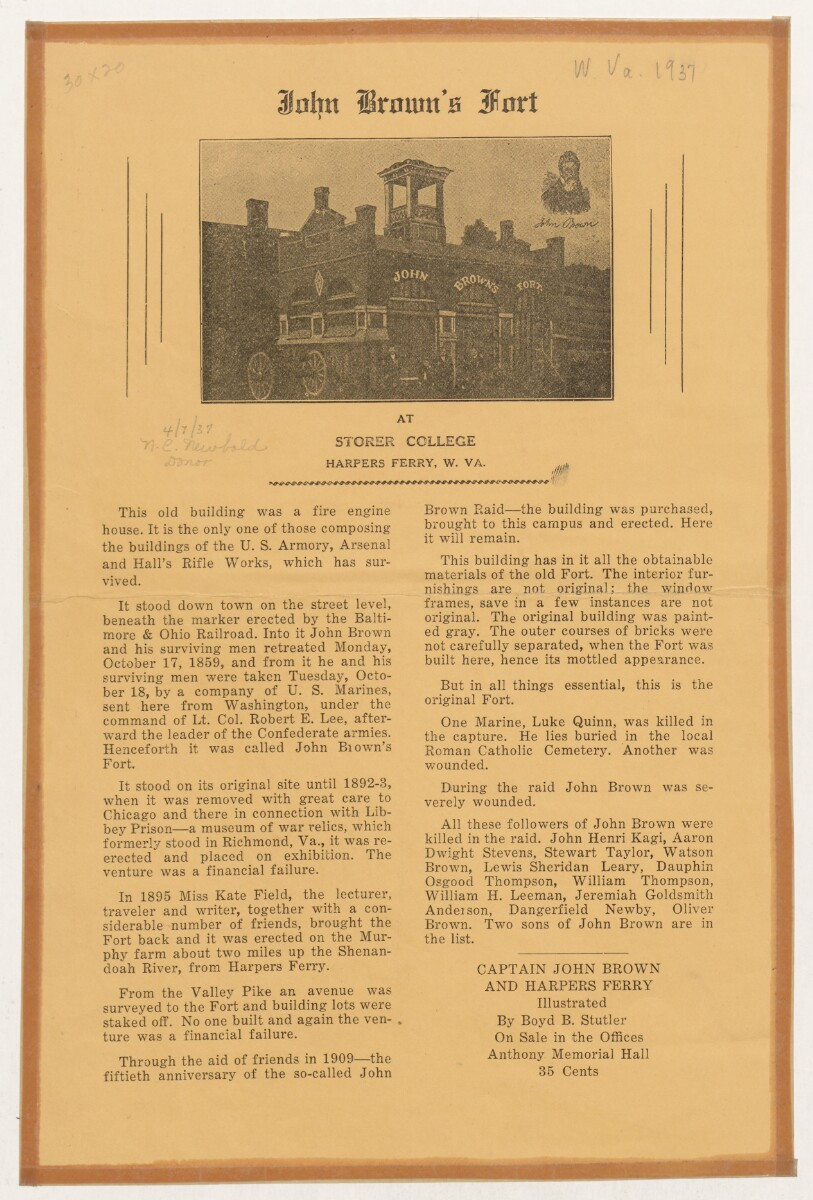
Poster announcing John Brown's Fort, Storer College, Harpers Ferry WV

As a direct result, the Fort was moved again (the 3rd move), in 1909, from this "somewhat inaccessible" site to Storer College, where it remained until 1969, longer (as of 2021) than it has been at any other location since 1859. The college, which closed in 1955, bought John Brown's Fort from Alexander Murphy for $900—Murphy (~$10,817 in 2025) wanted compensation for the many tourists' damage to his crops—and moved it to the college's campus. It was disassembled. When on the Storer Campus, it was inadvertently reassembled backward, as the builders did not realize that the glass negative they were using as a guide had a reversed image.

While there, it was used as the college museum. Glass cases of museum quality contained "a collection of old guns, helmets, money and other curiosities". An elevated gallery was added. The college published Captain John Brown and Harper's Ferry, a pamphlet about Brown and the Fort, written by Brown scholar Boyd Stutler.

Students gave tours of the Fort. "They took great pride in that. That symbol of freedom meant a lot to those students." At the time, these student tours were required of many students, to give them practice in public speaking.

In 1918, Storer alums paid for a plaque attached to the west wall of the firehouse (picture at right). The plaque reads:

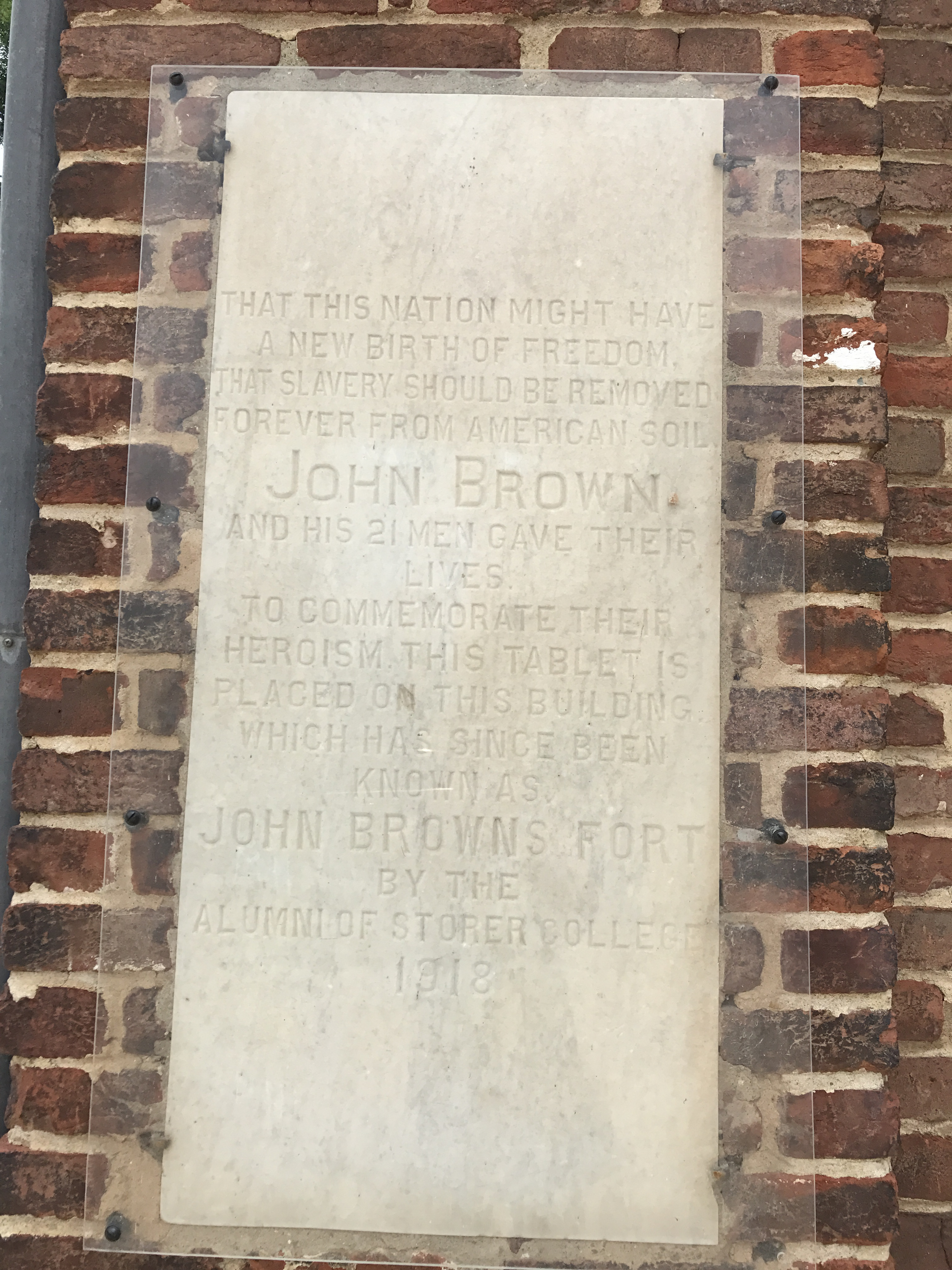
Plaque placed by Storer College alumni on John Brown's Fort.

THAT THIS NATION MIGHT HAVE
A NEW BIRTH OF FREEDOM
THAT SLAVERY SHOULD BE REMOVED
FOREVER FROM AMERICAN SOIL
John Brown
AND HIS 21 MEN GAVE THEIR
LIVES.
TO COMMEMORATE THEIR
HEROISM THIS TABLET IS
PLACED ON THIS BUILDING
WHICH HAS SINCE BEEN
KNOWN AS
John Brown's Fort
BY THE
ALUMNI OF STORER COLLEGE
1918

The National Park Service, through its Historic American Buildings Survey, has made public numerous photographs, plans, and descriptions of the building as it was at Storer College.

When the college closed, the museum collection was auctioned off to pay debts, and borrowed items were returned to their owners.

=== The National Park Service acquires and moves the building ===
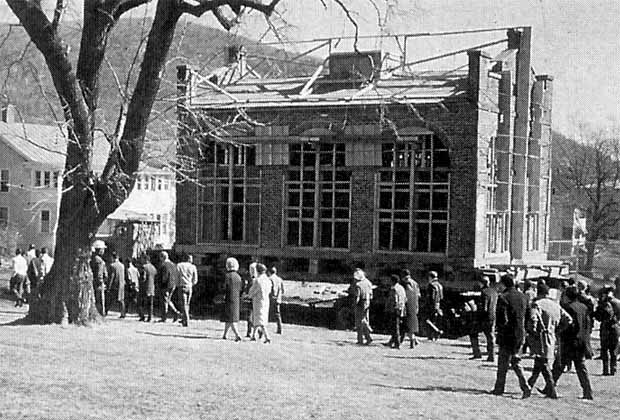
Fort being moved back to lower Harpers Ferry, in 1968.

When Harpers Ferry National Monument was created, it did not include John Brown's Fort or its original location. The local Black community opposed having it moved away from the College grounds, and the College trustees were "squeamish" about turning it over to the Park Service. The Park Service was accused of using "white paternalism" to oppose Black wishes and detract from the significance of the Raid for African Americans.

In 1960 the National Park Service acquired the building, which remained the main tourist attraction in Harpers Ferry. In the early 1960s, local concessionaires operated a private gift shop in it. Many visitors came to visit it at the college, to the point that they made it difficult to carry out the Park Service's plans for the former college. Park Superintendent Joseph Prentice wanted to "drastically eliminate the hordes of visitors and their automobiles from this location".

To accomplish this goal, removing "the only important attraction from the Storer College campus", in 1968, the Park Service moved it once more (the 4th move). The original location is covered by a Baltimore and Ohio Railroad embankment, so it was moved to a location close to the original, the most central location in Harpers Ferry. The Fort is now part of the Harpers Ferry National Historical Park and sits 150 feet (46 m) east of its original location, at 39°19′22.95″N 77°43′46.43″W. It is the most visited tourist attraction in the state of West Virginia.

From the point of view of crowd management, the Fort was placed in Arsenal Square to discourage parking in lower Harpers Ferry. Satellite parking and shuttle buses were set up.

The structure is not fully authentic due to the number of times it has been dismantled, moved, and reassembled. The doors are not original; the building was painted grey at the Armory. (See poster at right.) As stated above, 8,000 bricks replace the original ones taken as souvenirs. It is also not a replica, as portions of the building were "rebuilt backward" because builders were working from a negative and did not realize it needed to be turned over to see the building correctly. It was described in 2005 as "a bit smaller than its original size". "The age of the various parts of the building cannot be authenticated", is the comment of the Historic American Buildings Survey.

A Harpers Ferry Historical Association publication states that "the John Brown Museum" now houses the original armory gate. It had been taken by Alexander Murphy, who used it as an outer gate to his coal yard and had tried to sell it in 1927. It was donated in 1991 to the National Park Service by Jim Kuhn, a great-great-grandson of the Murphys.

After the National Park Service's move of the building, it acquired the original site and portions of the former Armory grounds through land swaps with CSX, the operator of the former Baltimore and Ohio route as of 2021. As of 2021, the NPS had no immediate plans to use it.

== Controversy over Armory bell ==
During a U.S. Army occupation of Harpers Ferry, a contingent of soldiers from Marlborough, Massachusetts, removed a bell hanging in the Harpers Ferry arsenal firehouse. Thirty years later, it was taken to Marlborough, where it has remained. Harpers Ferry has attempted to retrieve the bell without success.

In July 2011, Howard Swint, of Charleston, West Virginia, stated that the bell was taken without authorization. In legal terms, according to Swint, it was stolen and still belongs to the federal government. Swint filed a lawsuit in Boston's US District Court, but since the bell's original Federal records proving ownership were apparently lost in a fire, the judge dismissed the case without prejudice. Swint's legal actions generated controversy in the Marlborough area, but the bell has stayed in Massachusetts.

== Replica at Discovery Park of America ==
An approximate replica of the firehouse was built in 2012 at the Discovery Park of America museum park in Union City, Tennessee. There is a marker explaining the link with John Brown's raid.

== See also ==
- Heyward Shepherd monument
