= List of Lake Erie Islands =

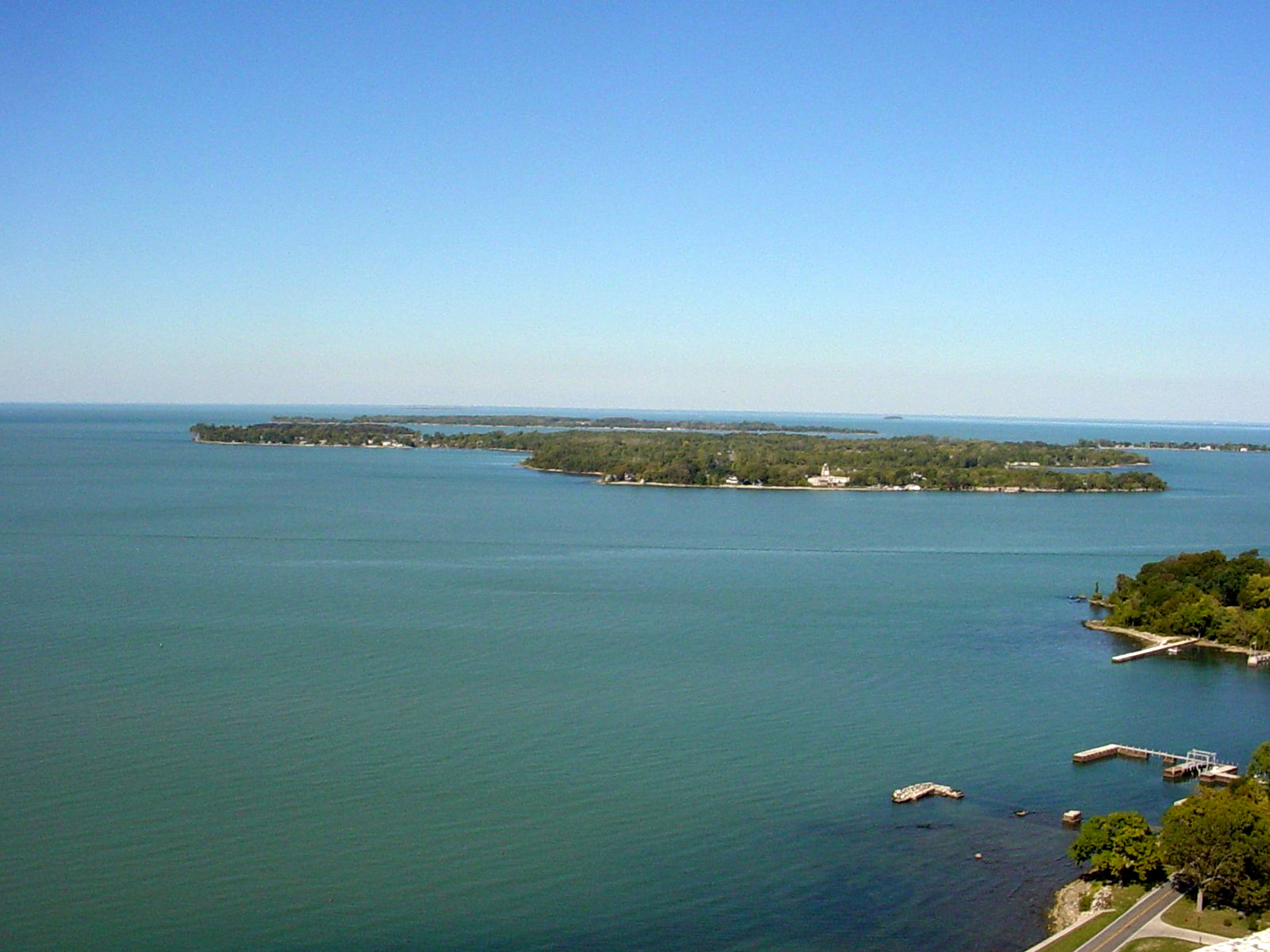
Lake Erie Islands

The Lake Erie Islands are a chain of archipelagic islands in Lake Erie. They include Kelleys Island, Erie Island, Pelee Island, the Bass Islands, and several others. The majority of these islands are under the sovereignty of the State of Ohio in the United States. Pelee Island is the only major inhabited island within the province of Ontario, while the smaller Middle Island is the southmost point of land in Canada.

Most of the larger islands are popular tourist attractions, served by car and passenger ferries running from the mainland and between some islands. Some small airports and numerous private marinas offer other ways for visitors to reach the islands. Combined with nearby Sandusky and Port Clinton, Ohio, the islands are part of the collective area known regionally as "Vacationland".

== Geology ==
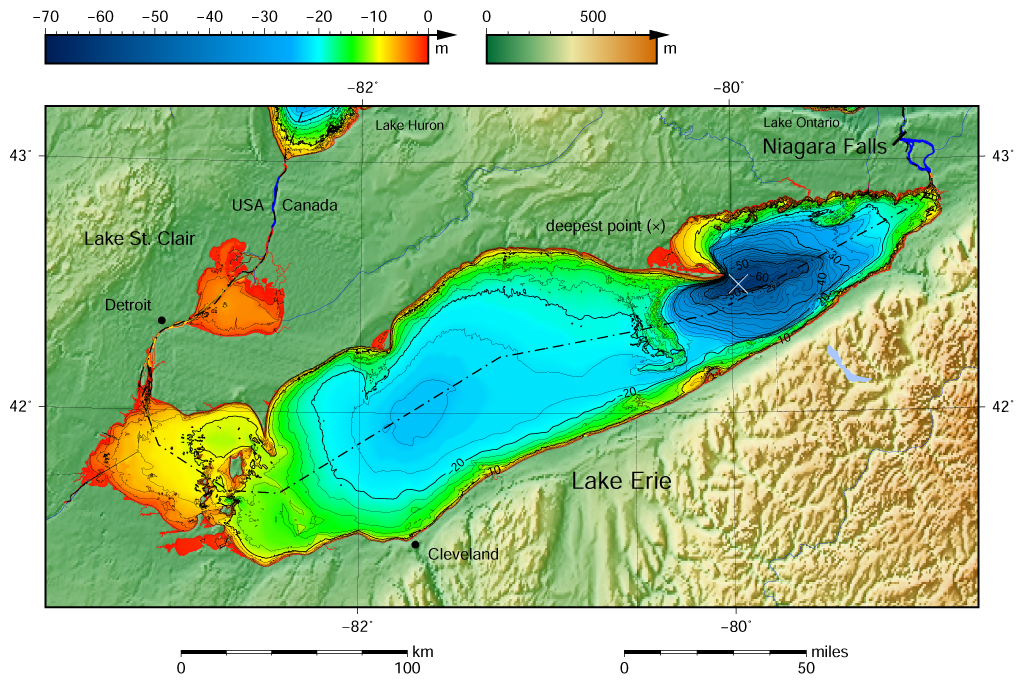
Depth map showing the three basins of Lake Erie. The islands are in the westernmost, shallowest basin.

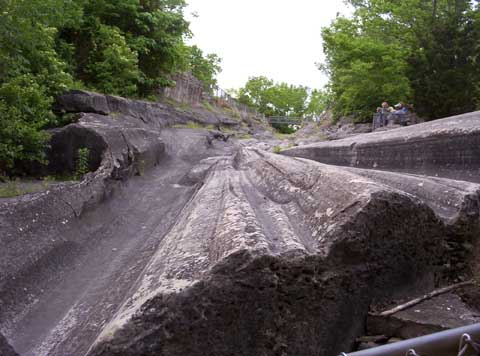
Glacial grooves stemming from the Wisconsin glaciation at Kelleys Island, Ohio

The Lake Erie Islands are geologically part of the Silurian Columbus Limestone. When the Pleistocene ice sheets carved out the basin of modern-day Lake Erie, these hard rocks proved more resistant to erosion than the shales in the east, and as a result, Lake Erie's western end is much shallower than the basins in the east, so that the islands remain above water. Quarrying operations on Kelleys Island revealed glacial grooves in the bedrock, which would in time be regarded as some of the best direct evidence of the Pleistocene ice sheets available anywhere. The glacial grooves are now protected as part of Kelleys Island State Park.

== Economy ==
Most of the islands are supported financially via tourism. Grape growing and wineries were once the mainstay of the economy. Kelleys Island is heavily forested and woods have replaced vineyards there almost entirely. South Bass Island is more developed and still has a few vineyards. Pelee Island is the only major island where vineyards remain common. Limestone quarrying on Kelleys Island ceased in 2007, and also there are a few hobby farms. South Bass, Middle Bass, North Bass, and Kelleys Islands all have active state parks part of the Ohio Department of Natural Resources with North Bass Island State Park being the largest at 593 acres and 87% of North Bass Island (also known as Isle St. George).

== Residents ==
Most of the islands are headed by a small group of year-round residents. However, eager vacationers often raise the populations dramatically during the summer months, most notable on South Bass Island, which is the most tourist-friendly of the islands despite its small size. The islands vary by year-round population of approximately 500 on South Bass Island, 100 for Kelleys Island, 40 at Middle Bass Island and 12 on North Bass Island.

Kelleys Island, Middle Bass, North Bass and South Bass (Put-in-Bay) have active school districts with North Bass Local School District being the last operating one-room schoolhouse in Ohio. Of the islands with year-round residents, only North Bass has no ferry service. Put-in-Bay Township Port Authority operates public airports for Middle, North and South Bass Islands. Kelleys Island and Pelee Island operate paved, public runways and Rattlesnake Island maintains a private grass landing strip.

== Lake Erie islands ==
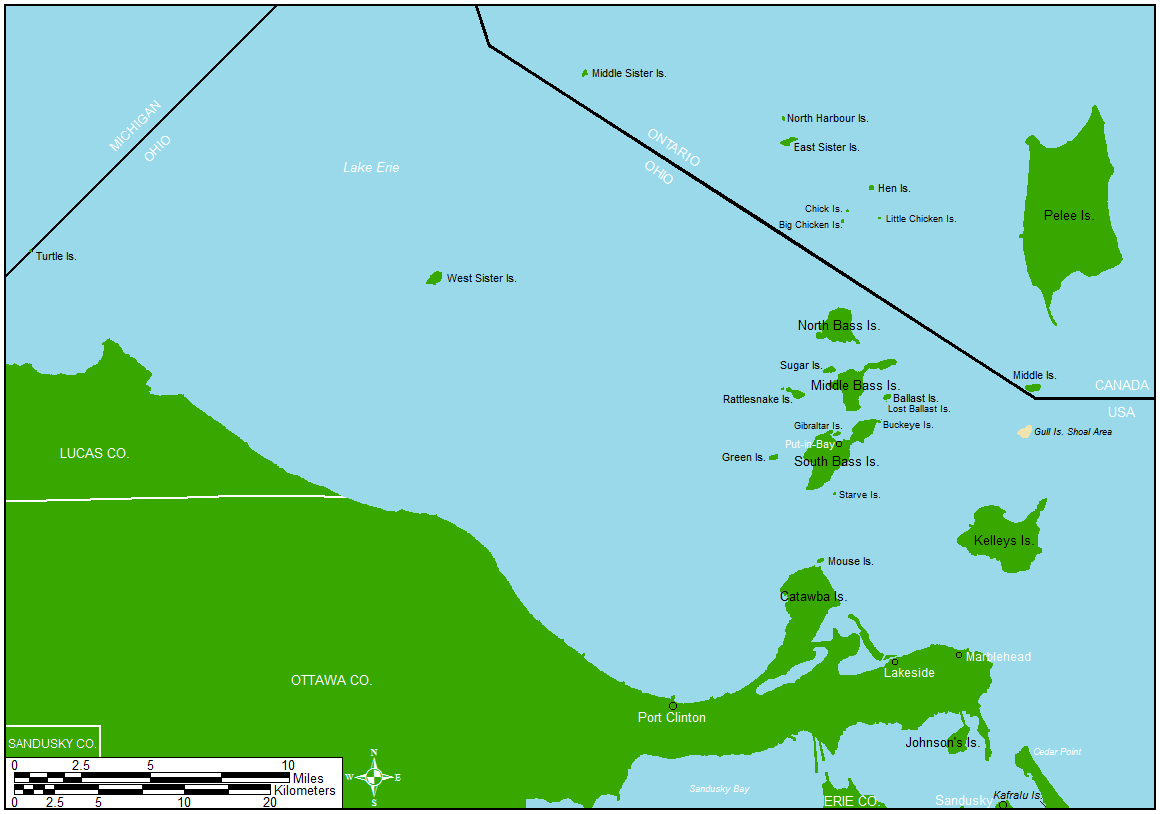
Map of the Lake Erie Islands.

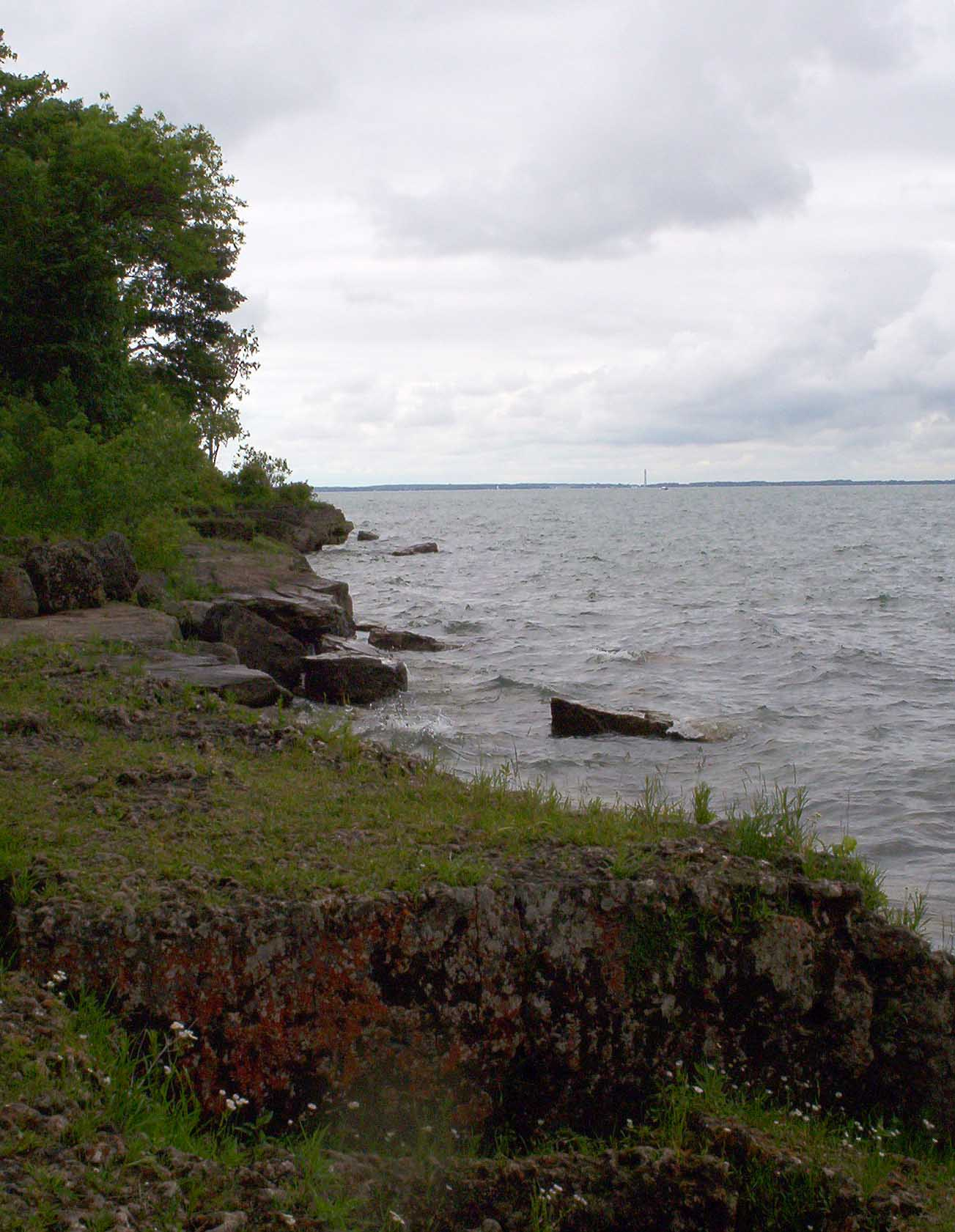
Alvar habitat on Kelleys Island. Perry's Victory and International Peace Memorial is barely visible in the distance on neighboring South Bass Island

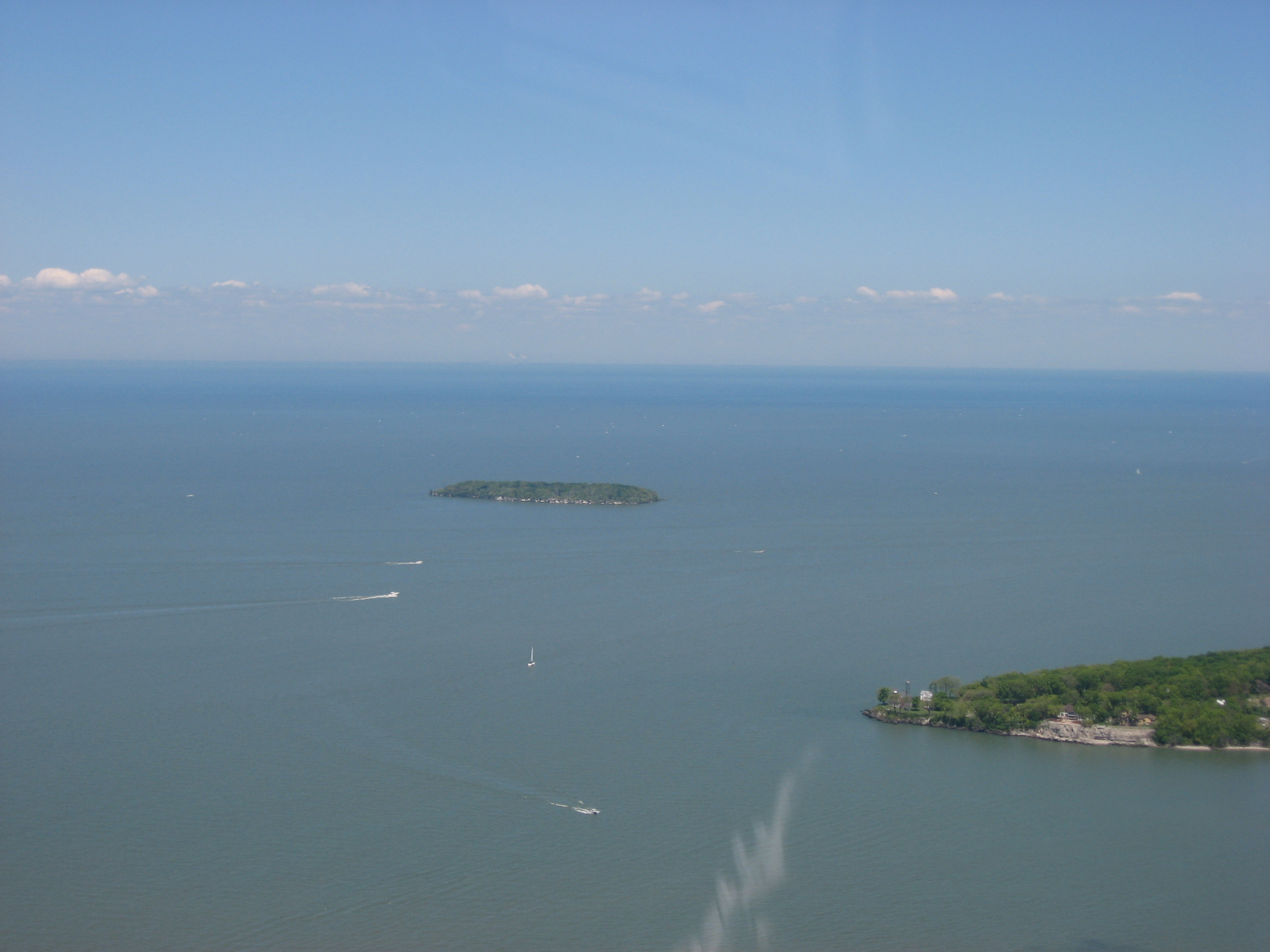
Green Island from the air, with South Bass Island in the foreground

Name	State/Province	Area sq. mi.(km²)	Location	Inhabited?
Pelee Island	Ontario	16.140 sq. mi. (41.79 km^{2})	41°46′00″N 82°38′27″W	Yes
Kelleys Island	Ohio	4.41 sq. mi. (11.42 km^{2})	41°36′05″N 82°41′51″W	Yes
South Bass Island	Ohio	2.482 sq. mi. (6.428 km^{2})	41°38′59″N 82°49′08″W	Yes
Middle Bass Island	Ohio	1.258 sq. mi. (3.258 km^{2})	41°40′45″N 82°48′40″W	Yes
North Bass Island	Ohio	1.076 sq. mi. (2.786 km^{2})	41°43′00″N 82°49′00″W	Yes
Johnson's Island	Ohio	0.469 sq. mi. (1.215 km^{2})	41°29′47″N 82°44′05″W	Yes
Rattlesnake Island	Ohio	0.133 sq. mi. (0.344 km^{2})	41°40′45″N 82°50′57″W	Yes
West Sister Island	Ohio	0.120 sq. mi. (0.311 km^{2})	41°44′23″N 83°06′19″W	No Longer
Middle Island	Ontario	0.072 sq. mi. (0.186 km^{2})	41°40′57″N 82°41′04″W	No Longer
East Sister Island	Ontario	0.058 sq. mi. (0.150 km^{2})	41°48′47″N 82°51′23″W	No
Sugar Island	Ohio	0.047 sq. mi. (0.123 km^{2})	41°41′31″N 82°49′34″W	Yes
Green Island	Ohio	0.027 sq. mi. (0.069 km^{2})	41°38′44″N 82°51′54″W	No Longer
Ballast Island	Ohio	0.019 sq. mi. (0.049 km^{2})	41°40′40″N 82°47′07″W	Yes
Mouse Island	Ohio		41°35′28″N 82°49′59″W	No Longer
Gibraltar Island	Ohio	0.010 sq. mi. (0.026 km^{2})	41°39′30″N 82°49′14″W	Yes
Indian Island	Michigan		41°45′08″N 83°23′27″W	No
Hen Island and her "Chickens": Big Chicken, Chick, and Little Chicken islands	Ontario		41°47′18″N 82°47′51″W	Hen Yes, the "chickens" No
Middle Sister Island	Ontario	0.015 sq. mi. (0.039 km^{2})	41°50′55″N 83°00′03″W	No Longer
North Harbour Island	Ontario		41°49′30″N 82°51′36″W	Yes
Turtle Island	Michigan/Ohio	0.002 sq. mi. (0.005 km^{2})	41°45′09″N 83°23′28″W	No Longer
Ryerson's Island	Ontario		42°36′08″N 80°16′54″W	Yes
Second Island	Ontario		42°35′24″N 80°16′15″W	No
Starve Island	Ohio	0.003 sq. mi. (0.008 km^{2})	41°37′36″N 82°49′21″W	No
Buckeye Island	Ohio		41°39′53″N 82°47′25″W	No
Lost Ballast Island	Ohio		41°40′32″N 82°47′11″W	No
Snow Island	Ontario		42°34′47″N 80°15′33″W	No
Mohawk Island (formerly Gull Island)	Ontario	0.015 sq. mi. (0.039 km^{2})	42°50′02″N 79°31′21″W	No Longer
Gull Island, Ohio	Ohio		41°39′35″N 82°41′14″W	No
Catawba Island (former island)	Ohio	5.700 sq. mi. (14.8 km^{2})	41°33′49″N 82°50′20″W	Yes
Gard Island	Michigan		41°45′00″N 83°26′32″W	No Longer
Presque Island (former island)	Pennsylvania	4.863 sq. mi. (12.594 km^{2})	42°09′47″N 80°06′03″W	Yes
Kafralu Island	Ohio		41°27′53″N 82°40′25″W	No Longer
Bird Island	New York		42°53′43″N 78°54′24″W	No

== See also ==
- Battle of Lake Erie
- Islands of the Great Lakes
