= National Register of Historic Places listings in Ottawa County, Ohio =

Location of Ottawa County in Ohio

This is a list of the National Register of Historic Places listings in Ottawa County, Ohio.

This is intended to be a complete list of the properties and districts on the National Register of Historic Places in Ottawa County, Ohio, United States. The locations of National Register properties and districts for which the latitude and longitude coordinates are included below, may be seen in an online map.

There are 31 properties and districts listed on the National Register in the county, including 2 National Historic Landmarks.

This National Park Service list is complete through NPS recent listings posted February 27, 2026.

== Current listings ==
| | Name on the Register | Image | Date listed | Location | City or town | Description |
|---|---|---|---|---|---|---|
| 1 | Charles Andres House | | November 6, 1995 (#95001196) | County Road 154 (Fox Rd.) on Middle Bass Island; 41°41′08″N 82°48′39″W | Put-in-Bay Township | |
| 2 | Carroll Township Hall | Carroll Township Hall | March 9, 1990 (#90000385) | Toussaint E. Rd. and Behlman Rd., north of Oak Harbor; 41°34′02″N 83°07′31″W | Carroll Township | |
| 3 | Catawba Island Wine Company | Catawba Island Wine Company | May 5, 1983 (#83002019) | 3845 Wine Celler Rd., east of Port Clinton; 41°31′55″N 82°51′31″W | Catawba Island Township | |
| 4 | Alexander Clemons House | Alexander Clemons House | September 17, 1987 (#87001628) | 133 Clemons St. 41°32′33″N 82°43′24″W | Marblehead | |
| 5 | Jay Cooke House | Jay Cooke House | November 13, 1966 (#66000620) | Gibraltar Island, Put-in-Bay, Lake Erie; 41°39′29″N 82°49′16″W | Put-in-Bay | |
| 6 | East Point Manor | | June 15, 1990 (#87000804) | S. Shore Dr. on Middle Bass Island; 41°41′40″N 82°47′13″W | Put-in-Bay Township | |
| 7 | First Congregational Church | First Congregational Church | September 22, 2000 (#00001161) | 802 Prairie St. 41°32′32″N 82°44′05″W | Marblehead | |
| 8 | Foster-Gram House | Foster-Gram House | March 19, 1992 (#92000175) | Langrum Rd. on South Bass Island; 41°38′43″N 82°49′13″W | Put-in-Bay Township | |
| 9 | Genoa Town Hall | Genoa Town Hall | June 7, 1976 (#76001504) | Main and 6th Sts. 41°31′05″N 83°21′29″W | Genoa | |
| 10 | Gill-Luchsinger-Bahnsen House and Barn | Gill-Luchsinger-Bahnsen House and Barn | July 16, 1992 (#92000888) | 426 E. 4th St. 41°30′31″N 82°56′04″W | Port Clinton | |
| 11 | Golden Eagle Wine Cellars | | April 24, 1986 (#86000868) | Fox and Lonz Rds. on Middle Bass Island; 41°40′36″N 82°48′37″W | Put-in-Bay Township | |
| 12 | Green Island Light | Green Island Light | December 18, 1990 (#90001909) | Green Island in Lake Erie; 41°38′44″N 82°51′57″W | Put-in-Bay Township | ARLHS USA 353 |
| 13 | Inselruhe | Inselruhe | December 12, 1976 (#76001506) | Northeast of Put-in-Bay at the junction of Bayview Ave. and Chapman Rd. on South Bass Island; 41°39′26″N 82°48′36″W | Put-in-Bay | |
| 14 | Island House | Island House | July 2, 2008 (#08000623) | 102 Madison St. 41°30′48″N 82°56′28″W | Port Clinton | |
| 15 | Johnson Island Civil War Prison and Fort Site | Johnson Island Civil War Prison and Fort Site | March 27, 1975 (#75001514) | Eastern shore area of Johnson's Island; 41°29′42″N 82°43′53″W | Danbury Township | |
| 16 | Lakeside Historic District | Lakeside Historic District | March 29, 1983 (#83002020) | Roughly bounded by Lake Erie, railroad tracks, and Poplar and Oak Aves., in Lakeside; 41°32′32″N 82°44′53″W | Danbury Township | Encompasses the entire gated community of Lakeside. |
| 17 | Main Street Historic District | Main Street Historic District | September 22, 1992 (#92001261) | Roughly bounded by 8th, Washington, 5th, and West Sts. 41°31′07″N 83°21′30″W | Genoa | |
| 18 | Marblehead Lighthouse | Marblehead Lighthouse | December 17, 1969 (#69000148) | State Route 163; 41°32′11″N 82°42′42″W | Marblehead | |
| 19 | Middle Bass Club Historic District | | August 23, 1985 (#85001843) | Grape and Grove Aves. on Middle Bass Island; 41°41′05″N 82°49′30″W | Put-in-Bay Township | |
| 20 | Betsy Mo-John Cabin | Betsy Mo-John Cabin | May 6, 1976 (#76001505) | About 4 mi (6.4 km) east of Port Clinton off State Route 53; 41°31′55″N 82°51′29″W | Catawba Island Township | |
| 21 | North Bass School | North Bass School | June 22, 2020 (#100005289) | 515 Kenny Rd. (North Bass Island State Park); 41°42′59″N 82°48′55″W | Isle St. George, Put-in-Bay Township | |
| 22 | Ohio State Route 51 Bridge over the Portage River | Ohio State Route 51 Bridge over the Portage River | March 17, 1994 (#94000239) | State Route 51 over the Portage River; 41°28′37″N 83°17′44″W | Elmore and Harris Township | Replace in 2020. |
| 23 | Old School Privy | Old School Privy | July 31, 1975 (#75001515) | 310 Main St. 41°30′54″N 83°21′34″W | Genoa | |
| 24 | Ottawa County Courthouse | Ottawa County Courthouse | May 3, 1974 (#74001588) | W. 4th and Madison Sts. 41°30′35″N 82°56′25″W | Port Clinton | |
| 25 | Perry's Victory and International Peace Memorial | Perry's Victory and International Peace Memorial | October 15, 1966 (#66000118) | South Bass Island; 41°39′15″N 82°48′41″W | Put-in-Bay | |
| 26 | Port Clinton City Hall | Port Clinton City Hall | February 10, 2000 (#00000096) | Adams St. 41°30′44″N 82°56′16″W | Port Clinton | |
| 27 | St. Thomas Episcopal Church | St. Thomas Episcopal Church | July 15, 1999 (#99000845) | 214 E. 2nd St. 41°30′41″N 82°56′20″W | Port Clinton | |
| 28 | South Bass Island Light | South Bass Island Light | April 5, 1990 (#90000473) | Langram Rd., on the southwestern point of South Bass Island; 41°37′46″N 82°50′30″W | Put-in-Bay Township | |
| 29 | Union Chapel | | March 8, 2021 (#100006196) | 5258 East Porter St. 41°34′58″N 82°50′06″W | Catawba Island Township | |
| 30 | War Of 1812 Battle Site | War Of 1812 Battle Site | February 23, 1972 (#72001038) | East Bay Shore Rd., 1 mi (1.6 km) west of its junction with Township Road 142; 41°30′51″N 82°44′43″W | Danbury Township | |
| 31 | Benajah Wolcott House | Benajah Wolcott House | March 14, 1991 (#91000251) | 9999 E. Bay Shore Rd., southwest of Marblehead; 41°30′52″N 82°44′54″W | Danbury Township | |

== See also ==
- List of National Historic Landmarks in Ohio
- Listings in neighboring counties: Erie, Lucas, Sandusky, Wood
- National Register of Historic Places listings in Ohio
