= List of islands of the Great Lakes =

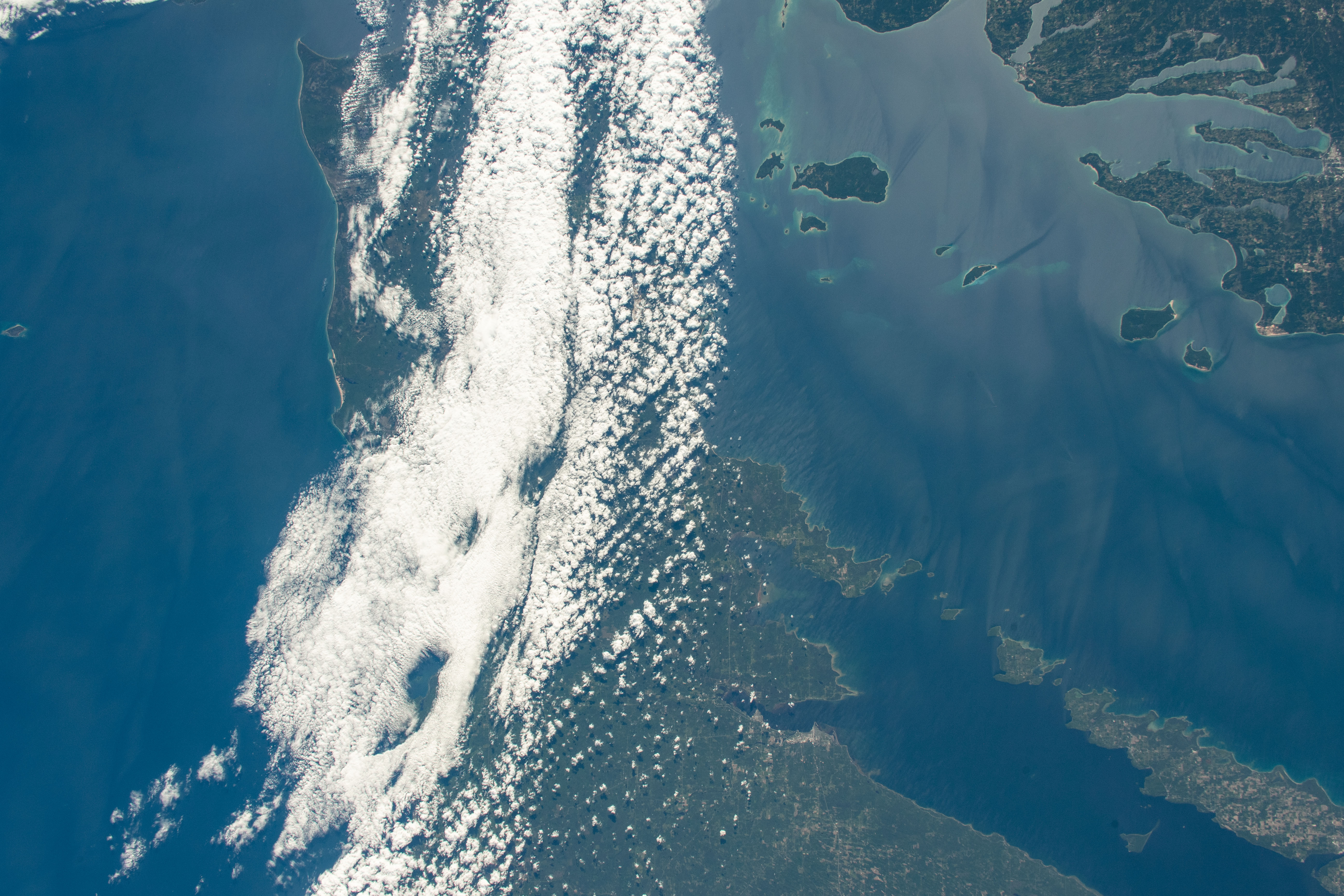
Islands in northern Lake Michigan and eastern Lake Superior on 17 June 2022; taken from the International Space Station. North is oriented towards the upper left. The Beaver Islands are at the top center, with the Manitou Islands at the top right and the Fox Islands between them. At the top right corner are islands inside of Grand Traverse Bay. The Potawatomi Islands are below the Beaver and Manitou Islands, and the Strawberry Islands and Chambers Island are inside of Green Bay in the lower right corner. Caribou Island in Lake Superior is near the left side border.

The Great Lakes islands consist of about 35,000 islands in the Great Lakes, a series of interconnected freshwater lakes on the Canada–United States border. The islands were created by uneven glacial activity in the Great Lakes Basin.

About 80% of the islands are located along the east side of Georgian Bay on the Canadian side of Lake Huron. These form the Thirty Thousand Islands, the world's largest freshwater archipelago. Many more islands are to the west of Georgian Bay, including Manitoulin Island, the world's largest lake island.

== Largest islands ==
The following are regarded as the ten largest islands of the Great Lakes:

1. Manitoulin Island, Ontario (Lake Huron) 2,770 km^{2} (1,068 sq mi)
2. Isle Royale, Michigan (Lake Superior) 535 km^{2} (207 sq mi)
3. St. Joseph Island, Ontario (Lake Huron) 365 km^{2} (141 sq mi)
4. Drummond Island, Michigan (Lake Huron) 350 km^{2} (140 sq mi)
5. St. Ignace Island, Ontario (Lake Superior) 274 km^{2} (106 sq mi)
6. Michipicoten Island, Ontario (Lake Superior) 184 km^{2} (71 sq mi)
7. Cockburn Island, Ontario (Lake Huron) 169 km^{2} (65 sq mi)
8. Beaver Island, Michigan (Lake Michigan) 145 km^{2} (56 sq mi)
9. Sugar Island, Michigan (St. Marys River) 128 km^{2} (49 sq mi)
10. Wolfe Island, Ontario (Lake Ontario) 120 km^{2} (48 sq mi) largest of the Thousand Islands

== List of notable Great Lakes islands and archipelagos ==
- Adventure Island, Wisconsin
- Apostle Islands
- Ballast Island
- Barker's Island
- Bass Islands
- Beaver Island, Michigan
- Beaver Islands, including Beaver Island and nearby islands, see Beaver Islands State Wildlife Research Area
- Belle Isle
- Bois Blanc Island, Michigan
- Bois Blanc Island (Ontario)
- Calf Island, Grosse Ile, Michigan
- Cana Island
- Caribou Island (near Michipicoten Island)
- Caribou Island (Thunder Bay)
- Catawba Island - former island presently connected to mainland Ohio
- Celeron Island, Gibraltar, Michigan
- Chambers Island, Wisconsin, in Lake Michigan's Green Bay
- Cockburn Island
- Detroit Island, Wisconsin
- Dickinson Island, Saint Clair River
- Drummond Island (contains Drummond Township, Michigan), Michigan
- Edmond Island - Gibraltar, Michigan
- Elba Island - Grosse Ile, Michigan
- Fawn Island, Saint Clair River
- Fighting Island, Detroit River
- Fish Island (Wisconsin)
- Flowerpot Island, Tobermory, Ontario
- Foleys Island, Luna Pier area
- Fox Island
- Fox Islands, Michigan
- Fox Islands (Ontario)
- Gard Island, Michigan–Ohio border area
- Grassy Island - Wyandotte, Michigan
- Gravel Island (Wisconsin)
- Green Bay Islands
- Green Island, Saint Clair River
- Green Island, Wisconsin, in Lake Michigan's Green Bay
- Grosse Ile, Michigan
- Gull Island, Wisconsin
- Gull Island, Michigan
- Gull Island, Saint Clair River
- Harsens Island
- Hat Island, Wisconsin, in Lake Michigan's Green Bay
- Hickory Island, Grosse Ile, Michigan
- Hog Island (Wisconsin)
- Horse Island, city of Gibraltar in the state of Michigan, in the Detroit River
- Horseshoe Island, Wisconsin, in Lake Michigan's Green Bay
- Howe Island
- Ile Parisienne
- Indian Island, Michigan-Ohio border area
- Isle Royale, Michigan
- Johnson's Island
- Kelleys Island
- Mackinac Island, Michigan
- Madeline Island
- Manitou Islands, Michigan:
  - North Manitou Island
  - South Manitou Island
- Manitoulin Island
- McDonald Island, Saint Clair River
- Meso Island, Grosse Ile, Michigan
- Michipicoten Island
- Middle Island, Saint Clair River
- Neebish Island, Michigan
- North Island, Saint Clair River
- Parry Island
- Pelee Island
- Pilot Island, Wisconsin
- Plum Island (Wisconsin)
- Potawatomi Islands on the eastern side of Lake Michigan's Green Bay
  - Washington Island, Wisconsin; largest of the Potawatomi Islands
- Rattlesnake Island
- Rock Island (Wisconsin)
- Saint Ignace Island
- Saint Joseph Island, Ontario
- Sister Islands in Lake Michigan's Green Bay
- Slate Islands, Ontario
- South Bass Island
- Spider Island (Wisconsin)
- Strawberry Island, Saint Clair River
- Strawberry Islands in Lake Michigan's Green Bay
- Sugar Island, Michigan
- Sugar Island, Ohio
- Swan Island, Grosse Ile, Michigan
- Thirty Thousand Islands archipelago
- Toronto Islands
- Walpole Island
- Wolfe Island, Ontario

== See also ==
- List of populated islands of the Great Lakes
- List of Lake Erie Islands
- List of islands of Michigan
- List of islands of Ontario
- Lists of islands
- Thousand Islands
