= Bass Islands =

Group of limestone islands in Lake Erie, Ohio

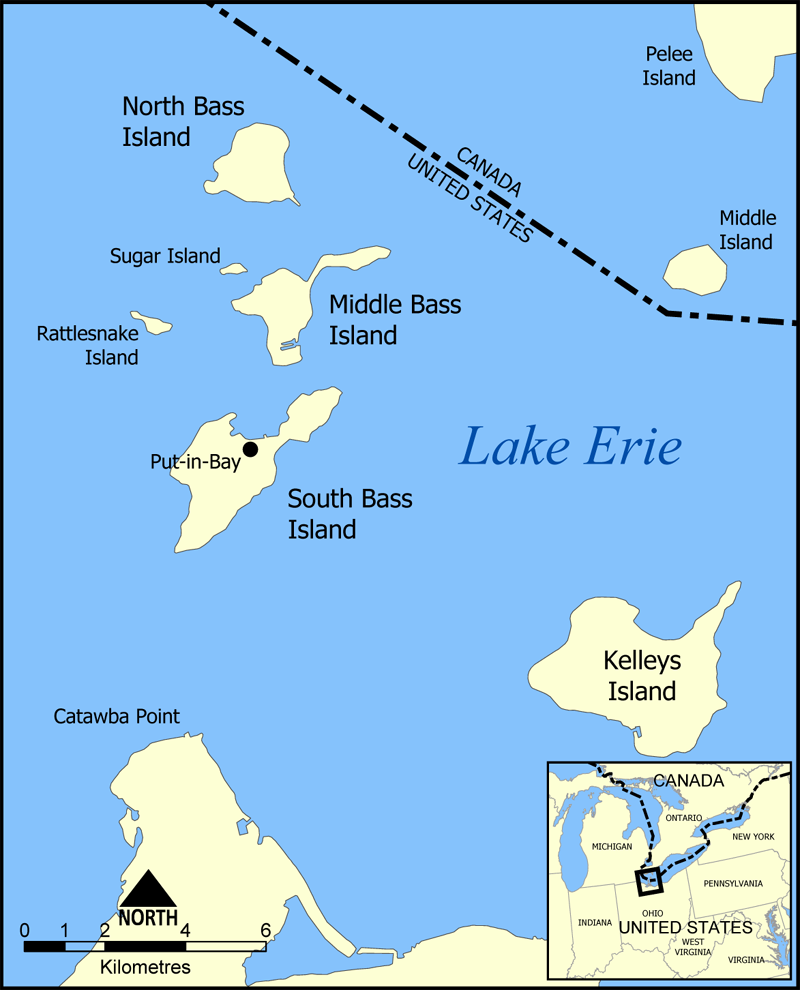
Map of the Bass Islands.

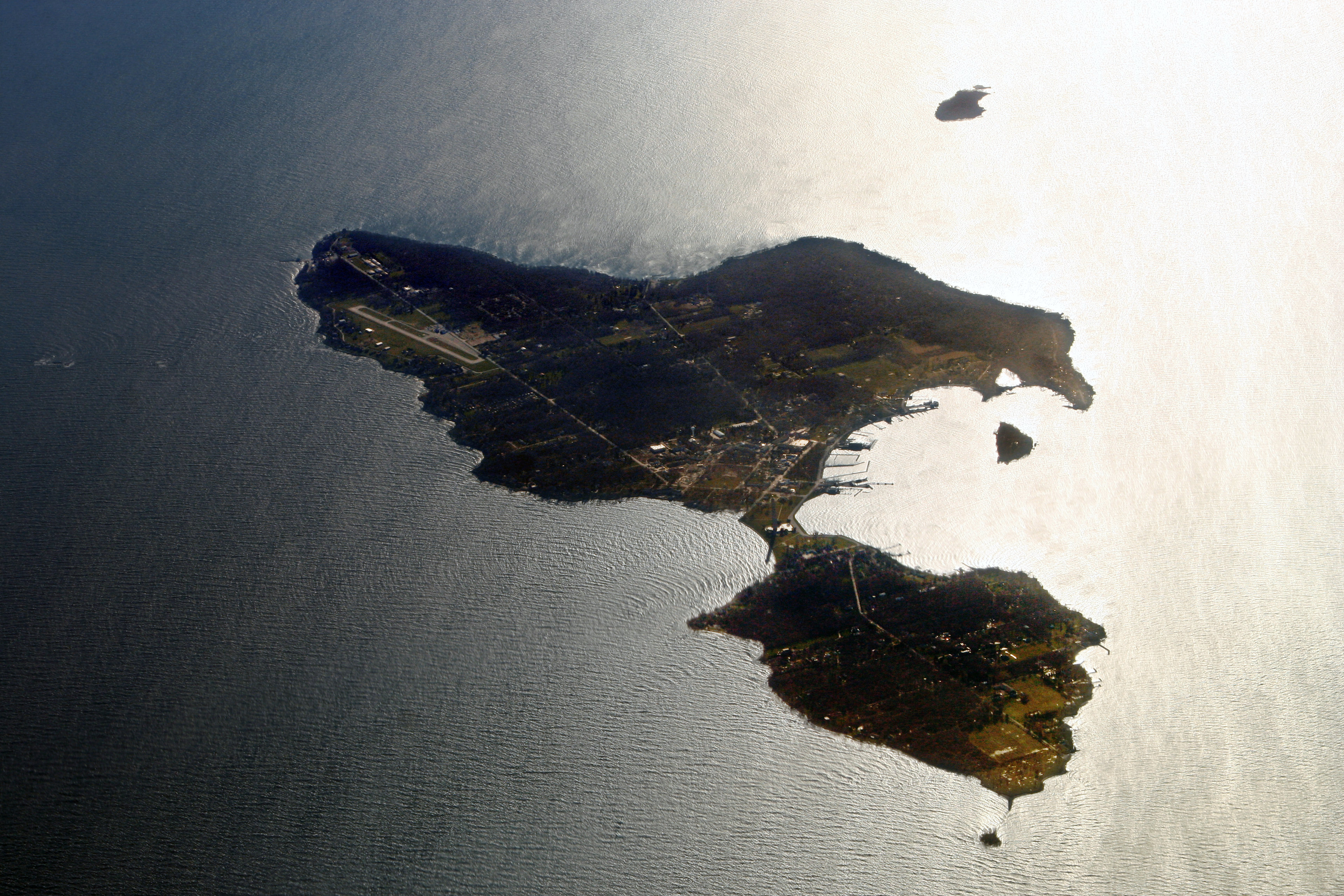
South Bass Island with the small village of Put-in-Bay from the air.

The Bass Islands are three American islands in the western half of Lake Erie. They are north of Sandusky, Ohio, and south of Pelee Island, Ontario. South Bass Island (41.6497°N 82.8189°W) is the largest of the islands, followed closely by North Bass Island (41.7160°N 82.8196°W) and Middle Bass Island (41.6821°N 82.8107°W). They are located in Put-in-Bay Township, Ottawa County in the state of Ohio. Historically Middle Bass was once called Isle des Fleures and North Bass has the small unincorporated community Isle Saint George

The Bass Island Archipelago includes the three Bass Islands, plus the Ohio islands of Ballast, Buckeye, Catawba, Gibraltar, Green, Kelleys, Lost Ballast, Mouse, Rattlesnake, Starve, and Sugar, and the Ontario islands of East Sister, Hen (including her three "chickens": Big Chicken, Chick, and Little Chicken), Middle, Middle Sister, North Harbour, and Pelee.

At their closest points, Middle Bass Island is approximately 0.5 mi (0.8 km) north of South Bass Island and North Bass Island is approximately 1.0 mi (1.6 km) north of Middle Bass Island. The border between Ohio and Ontario is approximately 1.0 mi (1.6 km) north of North Bass Island.

The village of Put-in-Bay on South Bass Island is a popular tourist stop during the summer. Perry's Victory and International Peace Memorial, commemorating the Battle of Lake Erie, is located on South Bass Island, near Put-in-Bay. The island is also the annual host of the Inter-Lake Yachting Association regatta, known as Bay Week.
