= Ohio wine =

American Viticultural Area in Ohio

Ohio
- Wine region
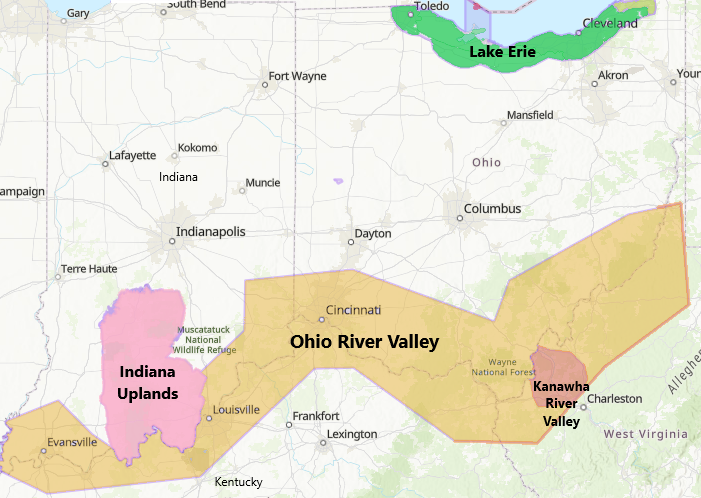
- Official name: State of Ohio
- Type: U.S. State Appellation
- Year established: 1803
- Years of wine industry: 203
- Country: United States
- Sub-regions: Grand River Valley AVA, Isle St. George AVA, Lake Erie AVA, Loramie Creek AVA, Ohio River Valley AVA
- Climate region: Continental, also humid subtropical in extreme southern lowlands
- Total area: 26.2 million acres (40,861 sq mi)
- Grapes produced: Cabernet Franc, Cabernet Sauvignon, Catawba, Cayuga, Chambourcin, Chancellor, Chardonel, Chardonnay, Concord, Delaware, Edelweiss, Gewürztraminer, La Crosse, Leon Millot, Marechal Foch, Marquette, Merlot, Niagara, Norton, Pinot gris, Pinot noir, Riesling, Sauvignon blanc, Seyval blanc, St. Pepin, Steuben, Traminette, Vidal blanc, Vignoles
- No. of wineries: 280

Ohio wine (or "Ohioan wine") refers to wine made from grapes grown in the state appellation of Ohio. Historically, this has been wine grown from native American species of grapes (such as Vitis labrusca), not European wine grapes, although hybrid and Vitis vinifera grapes are now common in Ohio. As of 2018 there were 280 commercial wineries operating within five designated American Viticultural Areas (AVA) located in the state.

== History ==
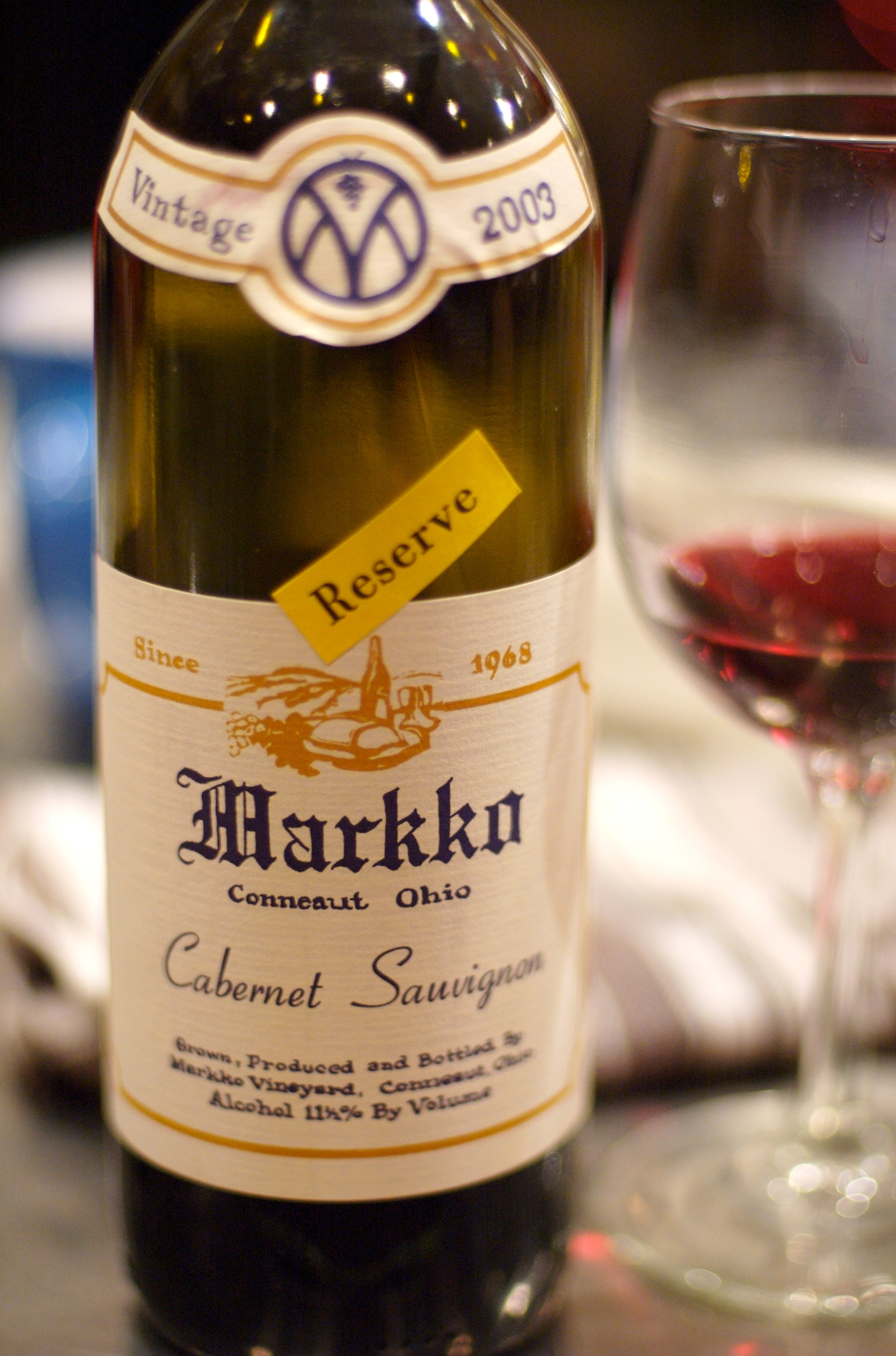
A Cabernet Sauvignon from Ohio.

The southern shore of Lake Erie falls within the global "Pinot Belt," which also runs through Burgundy and the Willamette Valley, which according to Wine Enthusiast means Ohio has "innate potential for attention-worthy wines".

Wine has been produced in Ohio since 1823 when Nicholas Longworth planted the first Alexander and Isabella grapes in the Ohio River Valley. In 1825, Longworth planted the first Catawba grapes in Ohio. Others soon planted Catawba in new vineyards throughout the state and by 1860, Catawba was the most important grape variety in Ohio. At this time, Ohio produced more wine than any other state in the country, and Cincinnati, Ohio was the most important city in the national wine trade. Golden Eagle Wine Cellars (later Lonz Winery) on Middle Bass Island, Ohio housed America's largest winery in 1872. As in many other states, Prohibition in the United States destroyed the Ohio wine industry, which has struggled to recover. As of 2018 Ohio was the 6th-largest wine producer in the United States.

In Fall of 2011 Kent State University at Ashtabula became the first university in the state to offer programs in viticulture and enology.

Wholly or partially in Ohio are the American viticulture areas Lake Erie, Isle St. George, Grand River Valley, Ohio River Valley, and Loramie Creek.

== Reception ==
In 2018 Wine Enthusiast called out Ferrante Winery, Firelands Winery, Gervasi Vineyard, Meranda-Nixon Winery, and Valley Vineyards as "wineries to know" in the state. That same year, RewardExpert analyzed wine ratings on CellarTracker and identified Heritage Vineyards in Warsaw in Coshocton County as having the highest-rated wine in the country.

== Wine industry ==
Many wineries are members of the Ohio Wine Producers Association. The association website provides resources for produces and consumers, including an extensive calendar of Ohio Wine events. It also includes the Ohio Wine Hall of Fame.

There are six "wine trails" in the state, including the Lake Erie Shores & Islands Trail, the Vines and Wines Trail, the Canal Country Trail, the Appalachian Wine Trail (Southeast Ohio bordering West Virginia), the Ohio River Valley Wine Trail (along the Ohio River in Cincinnati to Dayton), and the Capital City Trail (Columbus area).

== Wineries in Ohio ==
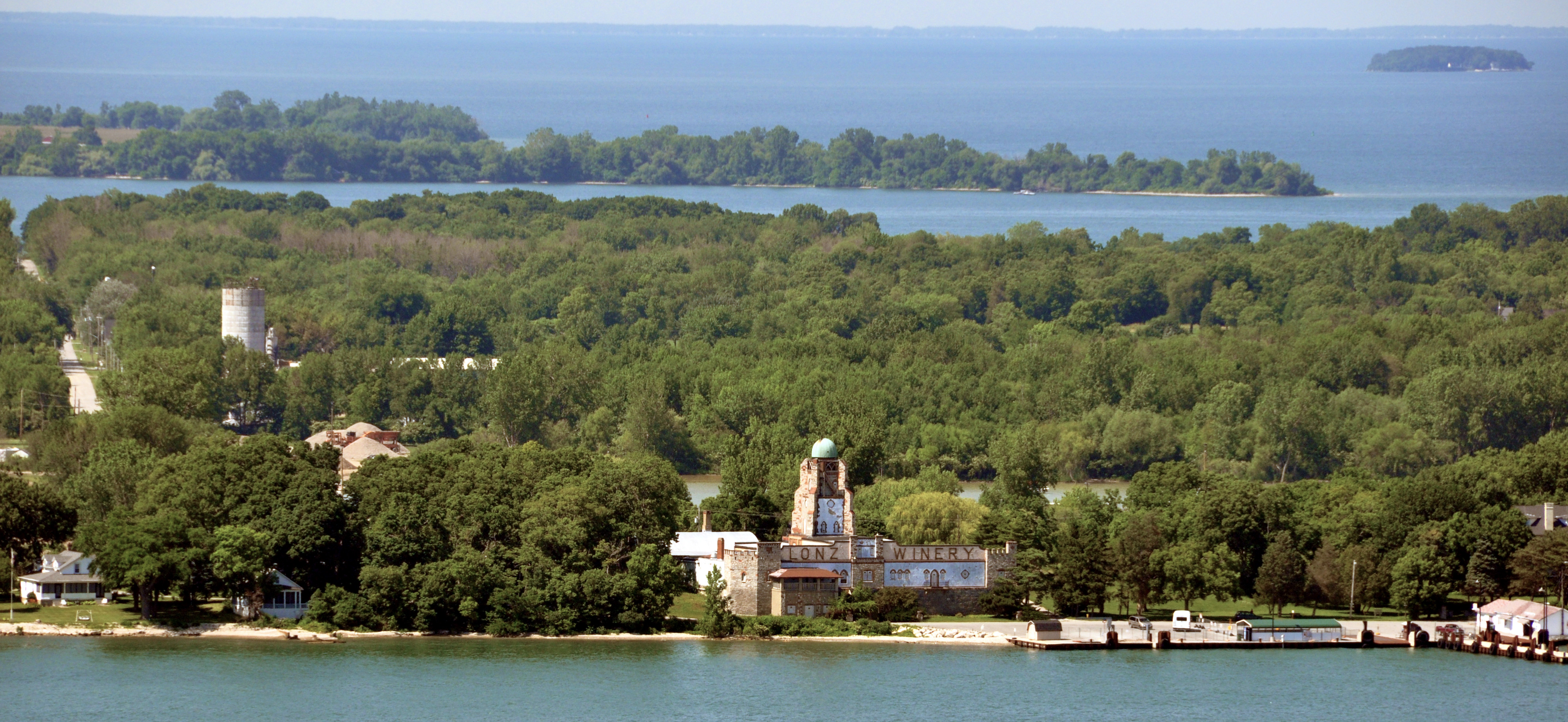
The former Lonz Winery on Middle Bass Island, Ohio at one time was the largest winery in the country

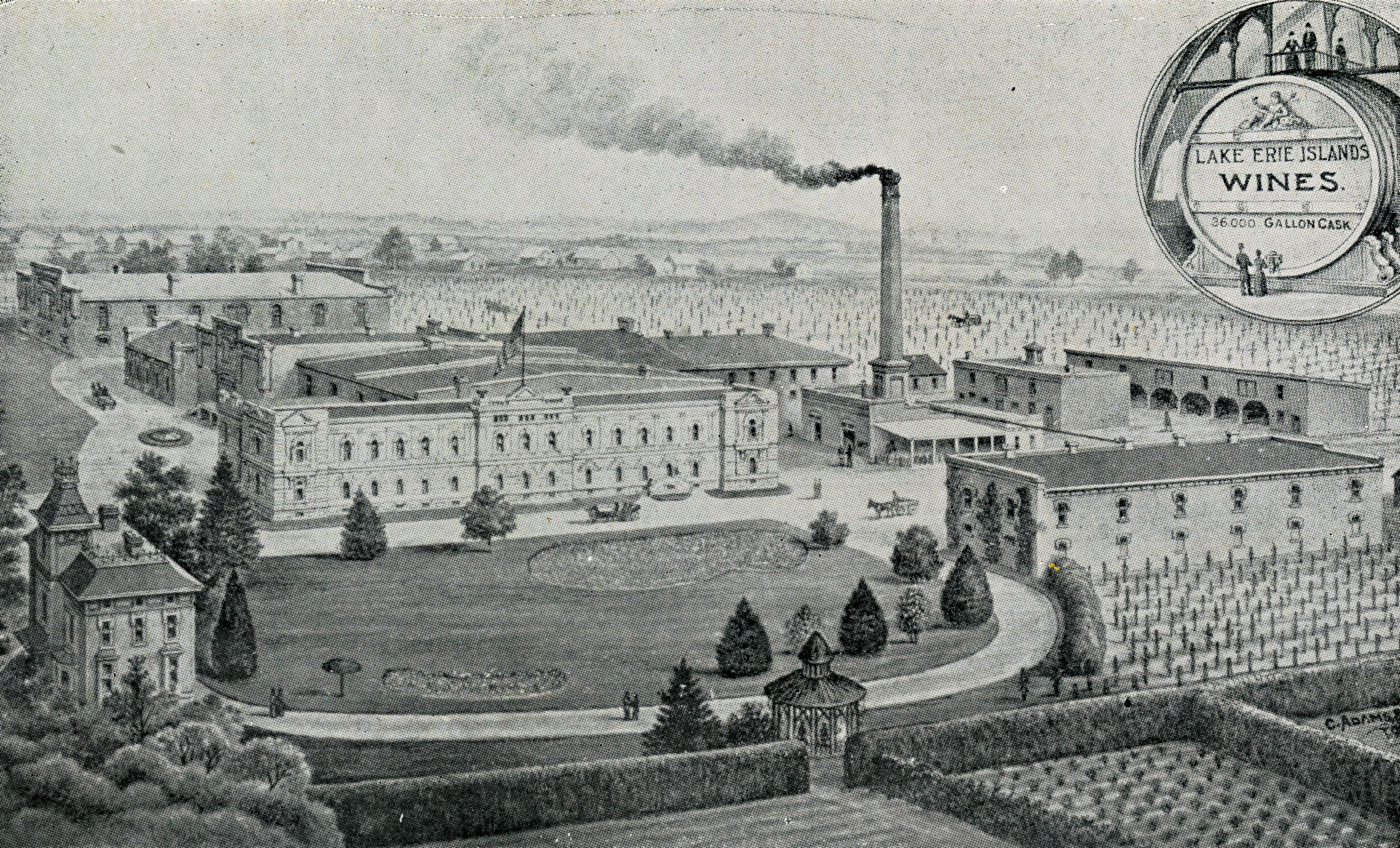
The Lenk Wine Company seen in a 1905 Toledo Chamber of Commerce publication

The following wineries and vineyards operate wholly or principally in Ohio.

Winery	Location	Coordinates
A.R. Winery	Arcanum	
Al-Bi Winery	Carroll	
Biscotti Family Winery	Conneaut	41°57.340′N 80°34.862′W
Breitenbach Wine Cellar	Dover	40°30.577′N 81°34.323′W
Buccia Vineyard	Conneaut	41°56.202′N 80°37.204′W
Buckeye Winery	Newark	
Candlelight Winery	Garrettsville	41°18.200′N 81°03.476′W
Cask 307	Madison	
Coffee Cake Winery	Hopedale	40°19.868′N 80°54.514′W
D & D Smith Winery	Norwalk, Ohio	
Debonne Vineyards	Madison	41°44.380′N 81°00.379′W
E&K Winery	Sandusky	
Emerine Estates	Jefferson	
Farinacci Winery	Austinburg	
Ferrante Winery	Geneva	41°45.567′N 80°57.258′W
Firelands Winery	Sandusky	41°26.145′N 82°46.385′W
Flatrock Mead and Winery	Napoleon	
Flint Ridge Vineyards and Winery	Hopewell	40°00.349′N 82°09.232′W
Georgetown Vineyards	Cambridge	40°00.795′N 81°35.631′W
Gervasi Vineyard	Canton	
Grand River Cellars	Madison	41°42.973′N 81°03.339′W
Grape and Granary	Akron	41°05.750′N 81°29.266′W
Harmony Hill Vineyards	Bethel	
Harpersfield Vineyard	Geneva	41°45.658′N 80°58.980′W
Heartland Vineyards	Westlake	41°28.240′N 81°53.736′W
Heineman Winery	Put-in-Bay	41°38.795′N 82°49.625′W
Henke Winery	Cincinnati	
Heritage Vineyard Winery	Warsaw	
Hermes Vineyard	Sandusky	41°22.789′N 82°44.471′W
Jilbert Winery	Valley City	41°14.017′N 81°55.336′W
John Christ Winery	Avon Lake	41°29.553′N 82°00.342′W
Kelleys Island Wine Company	Kelleys Island	
Kinkead Ridge Estate Winery	Ripley	
Klingshirn Winery	Avon Lake	41°29.327′N 82°01.952′W
The Lakehouse Inn Winery	Geneva-on-the-Lake	41°51.503′N 80°57.534′W
Laleure Vineyards	Parkman	41°23.307′N 81°01.275′W
Laurello Vineyards	Geneva	41°45.862′N 80°55.087′W
La Vigna Estate Winery	Higginsport	
Maize Valley Winery	Hartville	40°57.220′N 81°16.736′W
Maple Ridge Vineyards	Madison	
Marietta Wine Cellars	Marietta	
Markko Vineyards	Conneaut	41°54.026′N 80°34.314′W
Mastropietro Winery	Berlin Center	41°03.504′N 80°55.409′W
Matus Winery	Wakeman	41°15.339′N 82°19.962′W
Meier's Wine Cellars	Silverton	39°11.698′N 84°24.030′W
Meranda Nixon Winery	Ripley	
Gideon Owen Wine Company	Port Clinton	41°31.928′N 82°51.501′W
Myrddin Winery	Berlin Center	41°04.491′N 80°58.129′W
Old Firehouse Winery	Geneva-on-the-Lake	41°51.619′N 80°57.185′W
Old Mill Winery	Geneva	41°47.945′N 80°56.840′W
Paper Moon Vineyards	Vermilion	
Perennial Vineyards	Navarre	40°44.158′N 81°34.791′W
Quarry Hill Winery and Orchard	Berlin Heights	41°20.238′N 82°28.433′W
Raven's Glenn Winery	West Lafayette	40°16.994′N 81°42.304′W
Red Horse Winery	Barberton, Ohio	
Sarah's Vineyard	Cuyahoga Falls	41°10.747′N 81°33.137′W
Shamrock Vineyard	Waldo	40°28.830′N 83°00.858′W
Shawnee Springs Winery	Coshocton	40°14.890′N 81°53.746′W
Silver Moon Winery	Dover	40°30.753′N 81°33.074′W
Single Tree Winery	Amherst	41°18.392′N 82°16.513′W
Slate Run Vineyard	Canal Winchester	39°45.875′N 82°49.536′W
South River Vineyard	Geneva	41°44.469′N 80°58.247′W
St. Joseph Vineyards	Thompson	41°42.573′N 81°03.181′W
Stone Crest Vineyards	Frazeysburg	40°07.955′N 82°10.580′W
Stoney Ridge Winery	Bryan	41°30.976′N 84°30.686′W
Studio of 5 Rings	Rocky River	
Swiss Heritage Winery	Dover	40°30.644′N 81°34.402′W
Sycamore Lake Wine Company	Columbus Grove	
Tarsitano Winery	Conneaut	
Terra Cotta Vineyards	New Concord	39°56.054′N 81°45.139′W
The Winery at Spring Hill	Geneva, Ohio	
Thorn Creek Winery	Aurora	41°20.440′N 81°21.037′W
Troutman Vineyards	Wooster	40°44.916′N 82°00.586′W
Tuscan Cellars and Winery	Wickliffe	
Valley Vineyards	Morrow	39°21.444′N 84°10.266′W
Viking Vineyards and Winery	Kent	41°04.829′N 81°23.025′W
Vermillion Valley Vineyards	Wakeman	41°19′30.47″N 82°20′10.16″W
Vinoklet Winery	Cincinnati	39°16.940′N 84°36.865′W
Virant Family Winery	Geneva	41°44.226′N 80°59.415′W
Weymouth Winery	Hinckley	41°12.669′N 81°45.550′W
Winery at Versailles	Versailles	
Winery at Wolf Creek	Norton	41°04.064′N 81°38.267′W
Woodstone Creek	Cincinnati	
Wyandotte Winery	Columbus	40°04.088′N 82°53.607′W

== See also ==
- American wine
