= Lost Ballast Island =

Island in the United States of America

Coordinates: 41.675475°N 82.786383°W

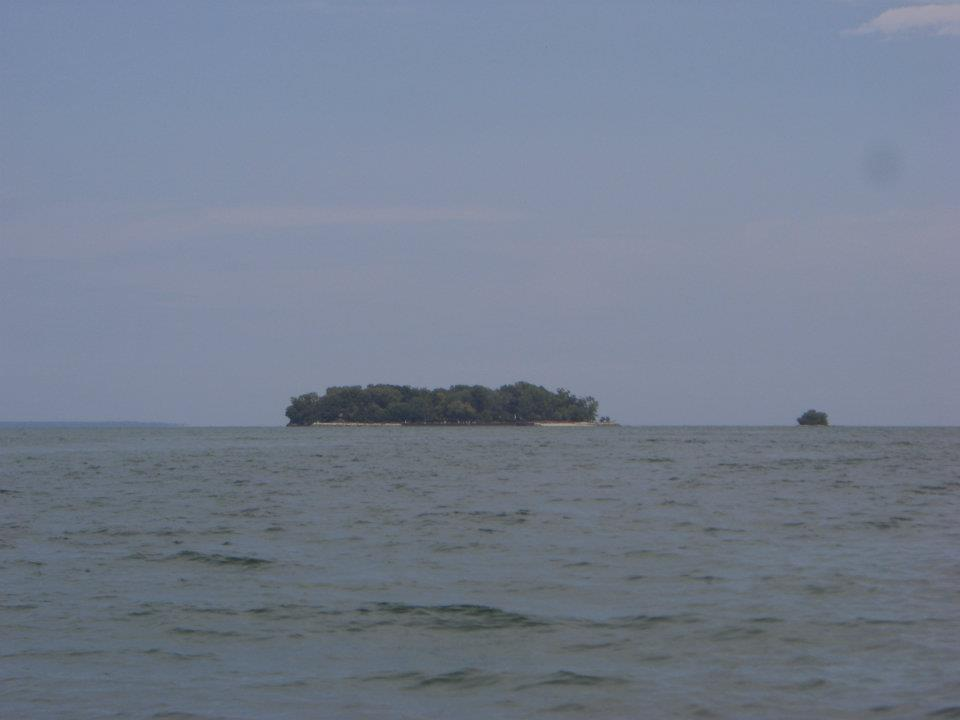
Lost Ballast Island (right) and Ballast Island as viewed from the Sonny-S, between Middle Bass Island and South Bass Island.

Lost Ballast Island is an island in the U.S. state of Ohio, located in Lake Erie. The island was once a part of Ballast Island, but was separated into a separate island by a strong storm. Historically, the island was not inhabited by humans, though it was a site for Nerodia sipedon insularum. Since the 1970s, it has sunk into Lake Erie to become a reef. During periods of low water the island reappears. It is located in Put-in-Bay Township, Ottawa County, Ohio.
