= Middle Bass Island State Park =

State park in Ohio, United States

Coordinates: 41°40′29″N 82°48′43″W

Middle Bass Island State Park is an Ohio State Park in Middle Bass, Ohio that is accessible by ferry from May 1 to about October 15. The island was home to a winery before Middle Bass Island State Park was established in 2001. The Lonz Mansion on the island was restored in 2024 and is now a living history museum and inn.

The park has a marina and natural areas including wetlands, woodlands, glacial grooves, and shoreline along Lake Erie.

The park includes a store and eatery and offers fishing, picnicking, biking, hiking, bird watching, historic sights, geologic features, primitive camping, cycling, a playground, and restrooms. Ohio has sought a winery operator for the property.

Once outside the park, the island has an airport, post office, stores, eateries, and vacation rentals.

== History ==
August Schmidt of Sandusky bought the property from another winery and built the 60-room Hillcrest Hotel in the area. He sold it to George Lonz and his wife Fannie Lonz in 1926.

George Lonz and his wife Lonnie were major wine producer and the island was a tourist attraction. July 1, 2000, a terrace collapsed causing one death and injuries to 75 people. The wintery closed and the 124 acre property was purchased by the state in 2001. Seventeen years later the State of Ohio renovated the area for a state park and restored the mansion and grounds. Ohio invested $4 million to restore his mansion and grounds.

== See also ==
- Ohio Department of Natural Resources
- List of protected areas of Ohio
- Put-in-Bay, Ohio
