= Middle Bass-East Point Airport =

- IATA: none; ICAO: none; FAA LID: 3W9

Summary
- Airport type: Private
- Owner: East Point Associates, Inc.
- Elevation AMSL: 582 ft (177 m)
- Coordinates: 41°41′40″N 082°47′47.6″W

Map
- Location of airport in Ohio 3W9 (the United States)

Runways
Direction	Length		Surface
Direction	ft	m	Surface
09/27	2,085	636	Turf

Statistics
- Aircraft operations: 1,300
- Source: Federal Aviation Administration

Middle Bass-East Point Airport (FAA LID: 3W9) is a private airport located on Middle Bass Island, Ohio, United States. It is owned and operated by East Point Associates, Inc.

== Facilities and aircraft ==
Middle Bass-East Point Airport covers an area of 14 acres (5.7 ha) which contains one runway designated 09/27 with a 2,085 ft × 67 ft (636 m × 20 m) turf pavement.

There is no fixed-base operator at the airport.

For the 12-month period ending July 11, 2013, the airport had 1,300 aircraft operations, of which 1,200 of them were general aviation and 100 were air taxi.

== See also ==
- List of airports in Ohio
