= Charles Andres House =

Historic house in Ohio, United States

- U.S. National Register of Historic Places
- Location within Ohio Location within the United States
- Location: County Road No. 154 (Fox Rd.), Middle Bass Island, Ohio
- Coordinates: 41°41′8″N 82°48′39″W
- Built: 1866
- Architectural style: Greek Revival and Italianate
- NRHP reference No.: 95001196
- Added to NRHP: 1995-11-06

Charles Andres House is a historic house on Middle Bass Island in Lake Erie, off the northern coast of Ohio. The house was built by winemaker Charles Andres, a German immigrant who moved to Middle Bass Island in 1854. Andres bought the 17-acre (6.9 ha) plot where he built his house in 1866, using most of the land for his vineyards. Ohio's Lake Erie islands, particularly the Bass Islands, were a major winemaking center in the nineteenth century, and most of its wineries were small operations run by German immigrants such as Andres. The two-story house has a vernacular design which incorporates elements of the Italianate and Greek Revival styles. Its design is typical of Bass Islands architecture of the era, as winemakers often put their profits toward large and attractive homes.

The house was added to the National Register of Historic Places on November 6, 1995.
