= North Bass Island =

Island located in Lake Erie, Ohio

Coordinates: 41°43′00″N 82°49′00″W

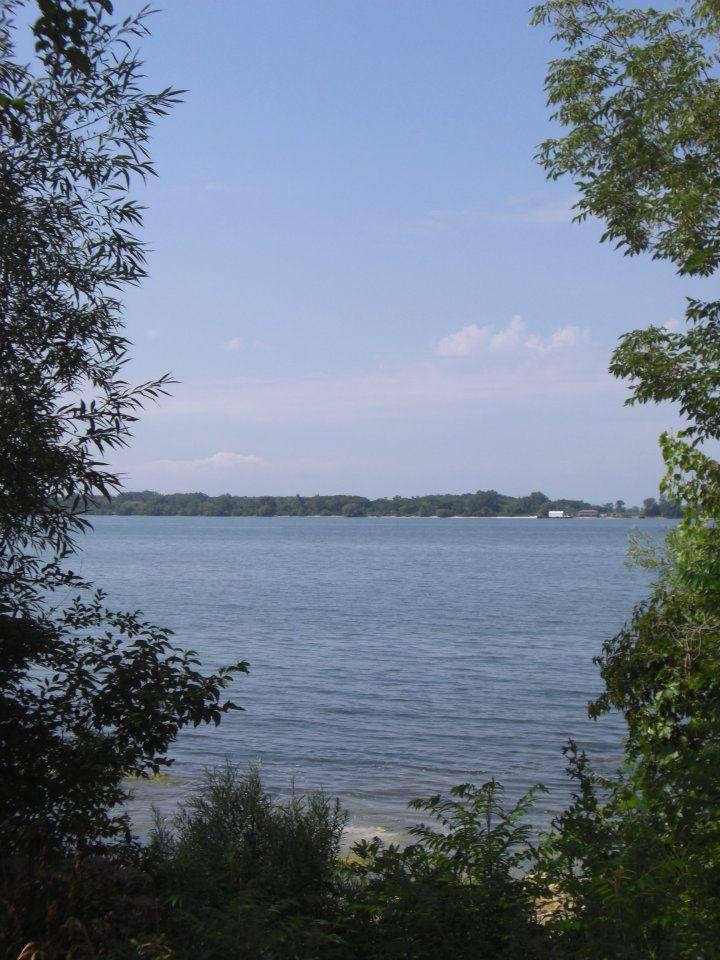
- North Bass Island as viewed from Middle Bass Island.

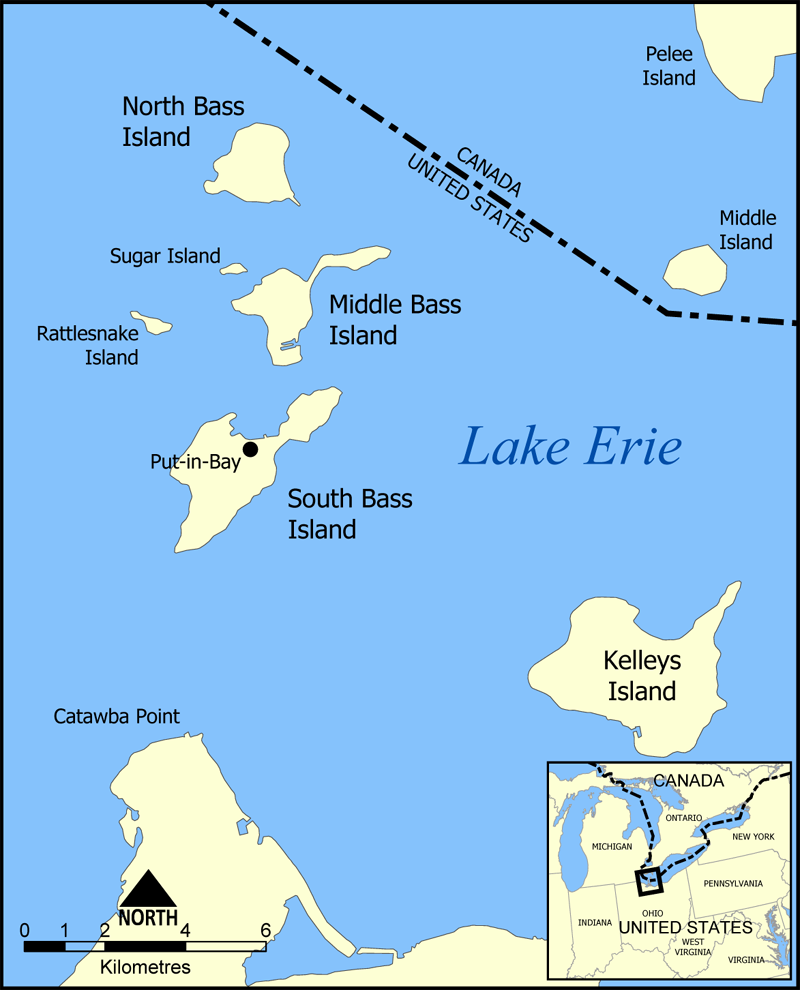
- Map of the Bass Islands.

Geography
- Location: Lake Erie
- Archipelago: Lake Erie Islands; Bass Islands
- Area: 688.6 acres (278.7 ha)

Administration
- United States
- State: Ohio
- County: Ottawa
- Township: Put-in-Bay
- Largest Community: Isle Saint George, Ohio

Demographics
- Population: 13 (2000)

Additional information
- Time zone: Eastern (EST) (UTC-5)
  - Summer (DST): EDT (UTC-4)

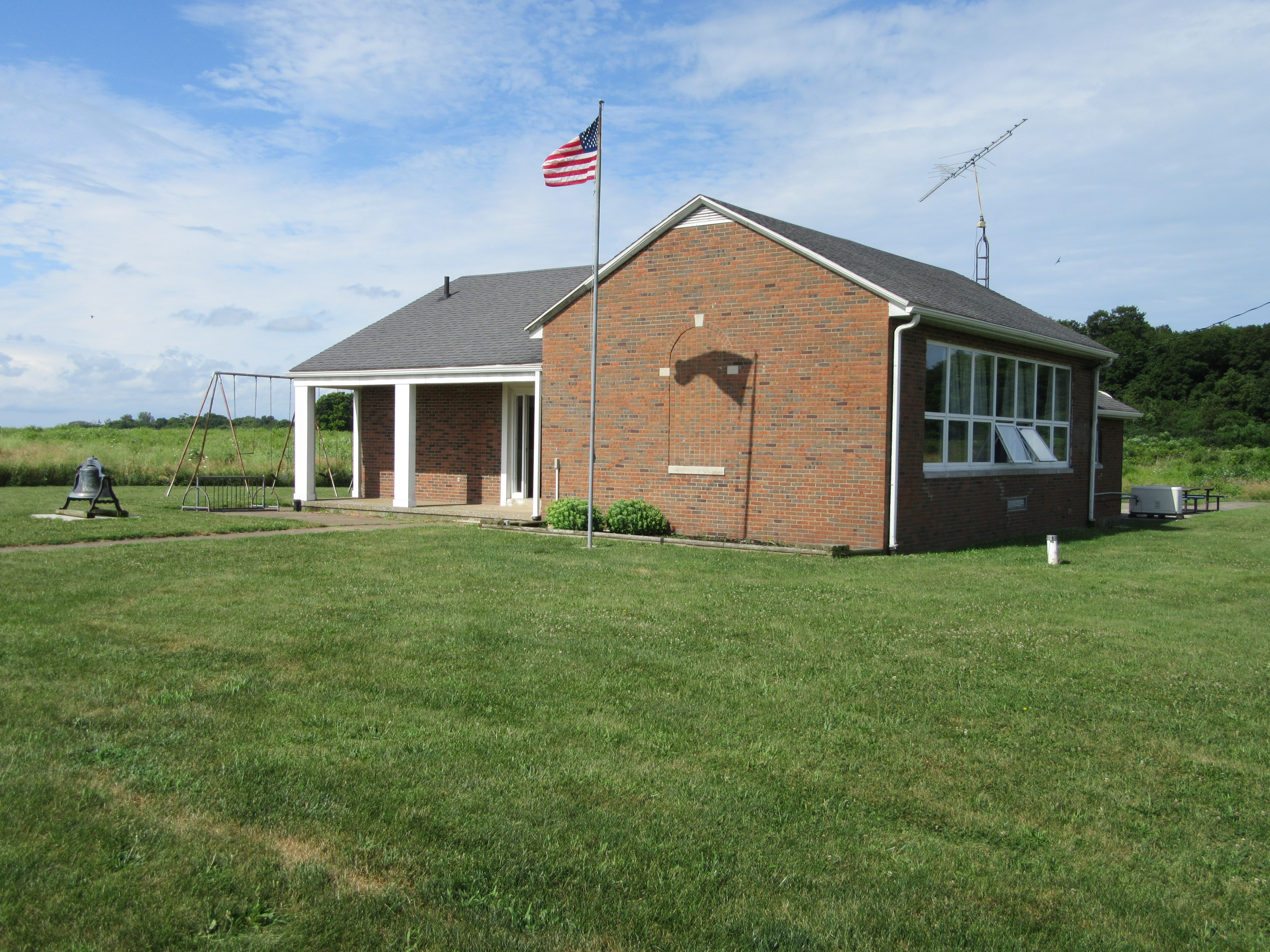
North Bass School built in 1952 includes a residence for the teacher was Ohio's last operating public one-room school.

North Bass Island is an island of the U.S. state of Ohio located in Lake Erie. A small unincorporated community, Isle Saint George, is on the island. The North Bass Island Post Office was established on May 25, 1864, and the name changed to Isle Saint George Post Office on March 2, 1874. The Isle Saint George ZIP code 43436 provides PO Box service. The island is equidistant to Port Clinton, OH and Kingsville, Ontario, Canada.

The 688.6-acre (2.786 km^{2}) island is one of few islands that has not been commercially developed. The state of Ohio purchased 593 acres (2.4 km^{2}) of the island to preserve it from development and operates it as North Bass Island State Park.

Historically, North Bass was mainly used as a vineyard. According to the 2000 census the island had 13 permanent residents. As of January 2007, there were roughly two dozen permanent residents residing on the island's 12 privately owned properties.

North Bass Island Airport (FAA LID: 3X5) offers a 1,804 ft (549.9 m) paved airstrip. Air traffic for take-off and landings to the north are complex as the Canadian border is challenging to avoid with less than two miles from the runway threshold. The runway underwent significant improvement October 2019 with a $2.338M grant from the FAA, the first improvement since the runway was originally paved in 1995. The runway is part of the Put-in-Bay Port Authority.

North Bass Island has no ferry service but has maintained a dock for commercial grape activity since 1880 with substantial improvements and additions as early as 1900. The most recent improvement to the dock to ensure that commercial vessels could still serve the island occurred in 2019. Nearly $500,000 worth of improvements were necessary just to make the dock operable.

North Bass Island School was the state's last operating, public, one-room school. It ceased operations in 2005, but is still maintained as a historical island heritage center. The school was designated by the Ohio Legislature and approved by the Ohio Department of Education as a K-8 building, the only one-room schoolhouse on an island in Ohio. High school students who reside on North Bass island fly to the mainland or another island. High school students have attended EHOVE Career Center, Put-in-Bay, Port Clinton, and Sandusky High School. All of the current members of the Board of Education attended North Bass School. Because there is no ferry service to the island and ice surrounds it for four months per year school year, high school students fly to the airport closest to their school. The school building was added to the National Register of Historic Places in 2020 as North Bass School.

North Bass Island is the second largest and northernmost island of the Bass Islands, which are a part of the larger Lake Erie Islands archipelago. On the southwest corner of the island there is a small bay named Manila Bay and there is a small unnamed creek that protrudes from the bay. The island is part of Put-in-Bay Township, Ottawa County, Ohio.

The island was part of a territorial border dispute between the United Kingdom in the Battle of Lake Erie, and a portion of the island was claimed by the Ottawa Tribe of Oklahoma in 2006.

== See also ==
- Isle St. George AVA
