= Isle St. George AVA =

American Viticultural Area in Ohio

Coordinates: 41°42′53″N 82°49′10″W

Isle St. George
- Wine region
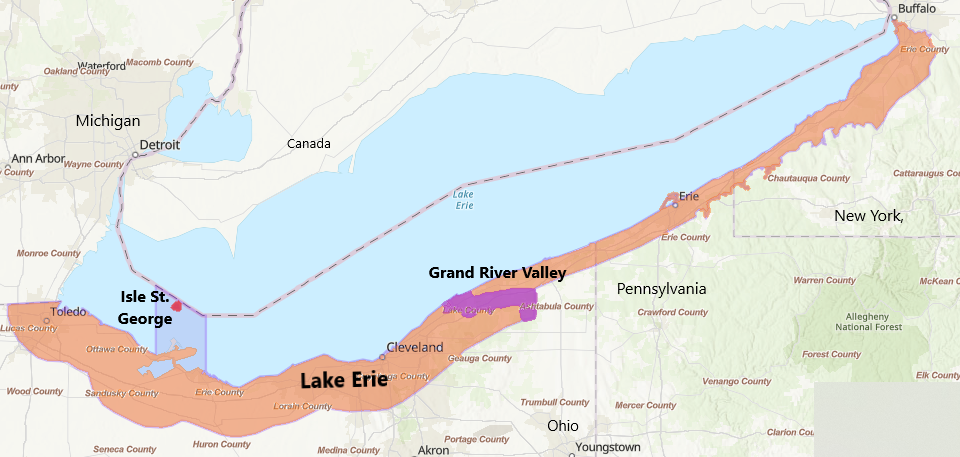
- Type: American Viticultural Area
- Year established: 1982
- Years of wine industry: 173
- Country: United States
- Part of: Ohio, Lake Erie AVA
- Other regions in Ohio, Lake Erie AVA: Grand River Valley AVA
- Growing season: 206 days
- Climate region: Region I-II
- Heat units: 2,601 GDD units
- Precipitation (annual average): 26.7 inches (680 mm)
- Soil conditions: Shallow, sandy and silty loams on limestone bedrock
- Total area: 640 acres (1 sq mi)
- Size of planted vineyards: 350 acres (140 ha)
- No. of vineyards: 2
- Grapes produced: Cabernet Sauvignon, Catawba, Chardonnay, Concord, Gewürztraminer, Pinot gris, Pinot noir, Riesling
- No. of wineries: 0

Isle St. George is an American Viticultural Area (AVA) located on North Bass Island, Ohio, an island in Lake Erie. It was established as the nation's eighteenth and Ohio's initial wine appellation on August 20, 1982 by the Bureau of Alcohol, Tobacco and Firearms (ATF), Treasury after reviewing the petition submitted by Meier's Wine Cellars, a bonded winery located in Silverton, Ohio (Cincinnati), proposing a viticultural area located in the western part of Lake Erie, to be named "Isle St. George."
The island is owned by the Silverton, Ohio-based Meier's Wine Cellars, Inc., the largest vintner in the North Central United States. The sole town on the Ottawa County island is also called Isle Saint George. However, the name "Isle St. George" is well established. This name has been associated with North Bass Island since at least 1903. The 1903 edition of the U.S.G.S. quadrangle map, "Put-in-Bay," identifies the community on North Bass Island as "Isle St. George. Historically, over half of the island was used to cultivate grapevines. Currently, only 44% of the island cultivates grapes. Lake Erie is warmer than the other Great Lakes, providing a moderating and warming effect on the local climate. Temperatures on the island during the growing season can be warmer than on the mainland due to the "lake effect." Cool climate varietals such as Catawba, Delaware, Gewürztraminer, Pinot noir, and Riesling are the most important in Isle St. George.

== History ==
Isle St. George was first settled in 1844. The name "Isle St. George" is derived from the first settler on the island, a man named George. The island has a long history of grape-growing. The first grapes were planted on the island in 1853 by Peter and Simon Fox. By the turn of the century, there were two wineries on the island to process the fruit. Today, there are approximately 350 acres (140 ha) of grapes on the island and grape-growing is the primary occupation of the island inhabitants. The petitioner stated, in 1981, that Catawba grapes have been cultivated continuously on Isle St. George for over 117 years, and that other grapes are also grown. All grapes grown on Isle St. George are sent to the Ohio mainland for processing since there are no wineries on the island. ATF concluded that the historical and current evidence supports the viticultural area as a distinct grape-growing area. Only 50 people live on Isle St. George, year-round. During harvest, the population doubles with the influx of migratory workers. All the houses, mobile homes, the church, and even the one room elementary school are maintained by Meier's. There are not any stores or banks or hospitals, though. All these needs are filled by way of air or boat. The island's high school students fly to class on the mainland and back, via airborne "school bus," an ancient 1928 Ford Tri-Motor named the "Tin Goose." The Goose belongs to Island Airlines, called the world's smallest scheduled airline; it runs regularly between Isle St. George, the mainland, and several other tiny islands. Other smaller planes are also available at a few minutes' notice, so Isle St. George, remote as it may seem, is never out of contact with civilization. It even has its own telephone company.

== Terroir ==
=== Topography ===
George viticultural area as a distinctive grape-growing region distinguished from surrounding areas on the basis of soils, topography, and climate. Isle St. George is relatively flat and no point is more than 14 feet (4.3 m) above the surface of Lake Erie whose mean elevation is 571 feet (174 m). The soil on the island is shallow, sandy loam and silt loam with a limestone bedrock that in some areas is only 20 to 30 inches (510 to 760 mm) deep.

=== Climate ===
The "lake effect" causes Lake Erie to act as a giant radiator. It's a unique climatic situation which exists only in this tiny area. The highest point of the island is 14 feet (4.3 m) above the lake surface, and there's a network of underground limestone caves. These help to delay the ground frost until late fall, because the lake waters are still so warm. As a result, the first frost is delayed and the growing season is prolonged. Consequently, Isle St. George has a frost-free period of 206 days, longer than any other area in the State of Ohio. Spring comes early and stays. Plus the mild breezes of Lake Erie, the foggy mist, and the delayed spring "bud break" all help nurture along the island's 350 acres of grapes. The USDA plant hardiness zone is 7a.

=== Soils ===
Based on the soil survey completed by the U.S. Soil Conservation Service, 1979, the soil structure in the vineyards is a fairly shallow, sandy and silty loams. The limestone bedrock is in some areas only 20 to 30 inches (510 to 760 mm) deep.
