= Kafralu Island =

Artificial island in Lake Erie, Ohio, United States

Coordinates: 41.464719°N 82.673476°W

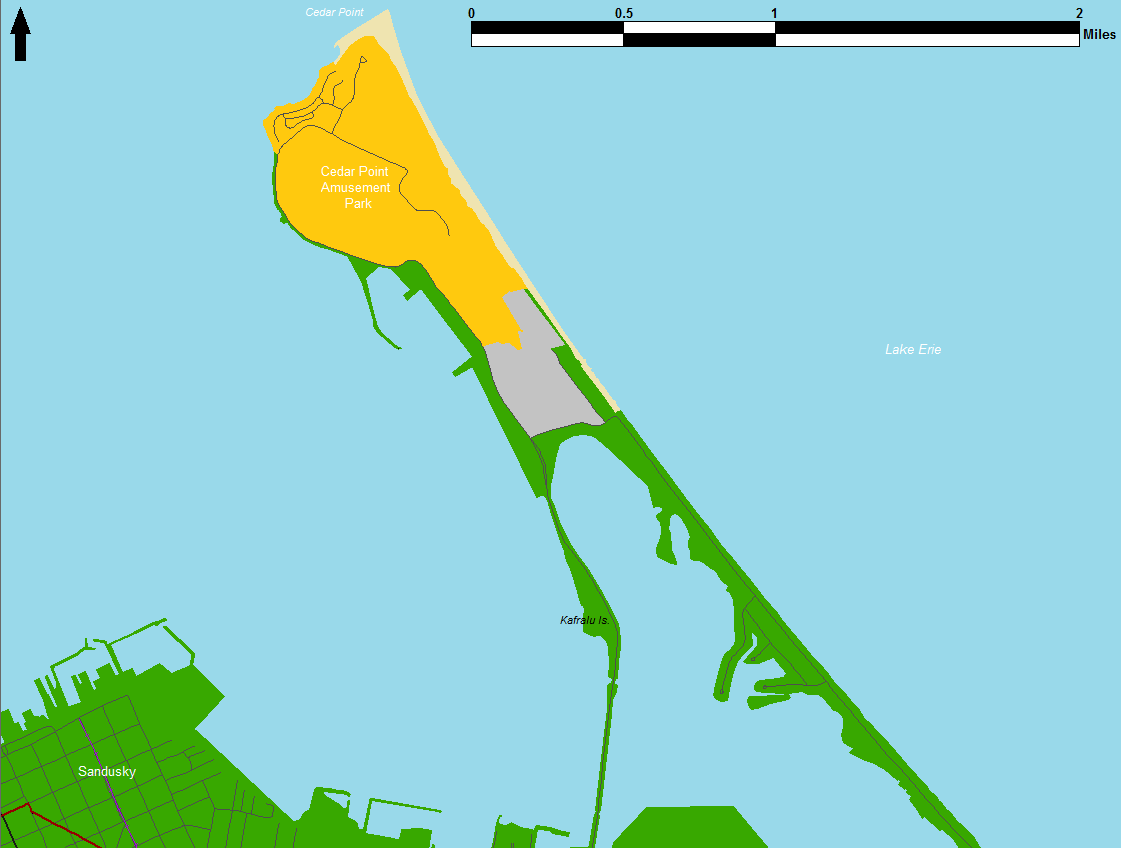
Kafralu Island was located southeast of Cedar Point.

Kafralu Island was a man-made island built in 1911 on a sandbar alongside Cedar Point in Northeast Ohio.

== History ==
Louis E. Wagner and his sons built Kafralu Island over a course of twenty years by hauling in logs and fill. Wagner coined the name Kafralu by combining the name of his wife (Katherine) with the names of his sons (Frank and Louis).

Wagner built cottages on the island, which were rented out during the summer months to tourists and other guests that would use the island for hunting, fishing, and vacations.

On September 11, 2016, Kafralu Island was the site of the worst auto accident to happen on Cedar Point property when a male driver went off the right side of the road before over correcting and going left of center, striking two oncoming vehicles. The driver was ejected from his vehicle and found along a densely wooded part of the island. The driver was pronounced dead at nearby Firelands Medical Center and two young women were also treated and released.
