= Middle Bass Island =

Island in Lake Erie, Ohio

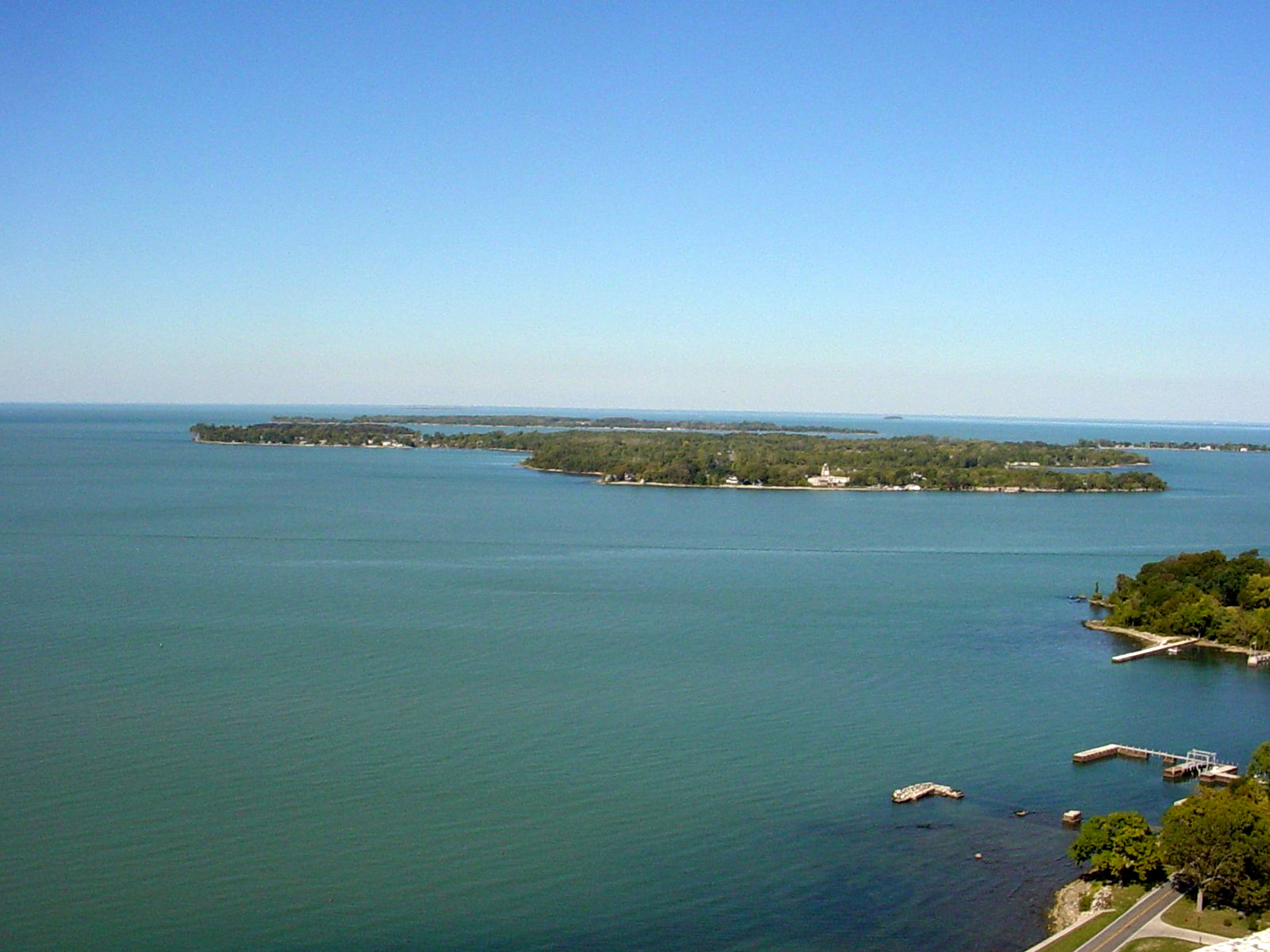

- Location in Ohio

Geography
- Coordinates: 41°40′45″N 82°48′40″W
- Archipelago: Lake Erie Islands
- Adjacent to: Lake Erie
- Area: 3.258 km^{2} (1.258 sq mi)

Administration
- United States
- State: Ohio
- County: Ottawa County

Demographics
- Population: 25

Additional information
- Time zone: Eastern (EST) (UTC-5)
  - Summer (DST): EDT (UTC-4)

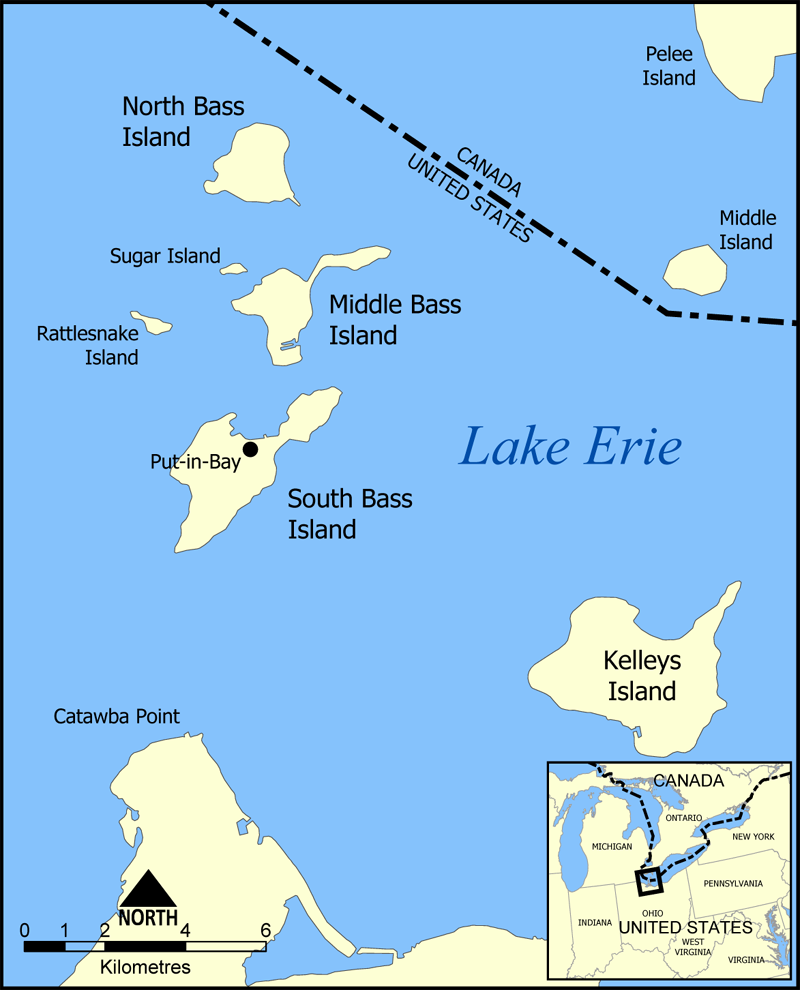
Middle Bass Island and the other Bass Islands.

Middle Bass Island is an island of the U.S. state of Ohio, located in Lake Erie. A small town, Middle Bass, lies on the island. The 805-acre (3.258 km^{2}) island is shaped like the Big Dipper and is one of three Bass Islands located at the center of a group of 23 smaller islands. It is located in Put-in-Bay Township, Ottawa County, Ohio.

Some of its more famous neighbors are South Bass Island, with the town of Put-in-Bay, Kelleys Island, and Pelee Island.

== History ==
The island was landed upon by French explorer, Robert La Salle, in 1679. The abundance of wildflowers on the island impressed La Salle and his crew so much that they appropriately named it Isle des Fleures, the Island of Flowers. It would retain this name for the next 200 years until it was acquired by a German count in 1856. With the aid of immigrant German workers, the island was used for grape cultivation. This proved to be a very successful undertaking. Old aerial photos of the island (and its neighbor, North Bass Island) show the majority of the island covered with neat rows of grapevines.

By 1875, Middle Bass Island's Golden Eagle Winery was reputed to be the largest wine producer in the United States. The Lonz family acquired the business in 1884 and owned and operated it until the death of George Lonz in 1968. Lonz Winery has often been compared with the wineries of the German Rhineland. The old castle-like structure has been visited by countless dignitaries including five American Presidents. The winery is now part of a corporation bearing the Lonz name. Since 1979, the wines have been made by Italian enologist Claudio Salvador.

On July 1, 2000, tragedy struck the Lonz Winery when a terrace collapsed leaving one dead and dozens injured.

Lonz Winery was purchased by the state of Ohio and Middle Bass Island State Park established in 2001.

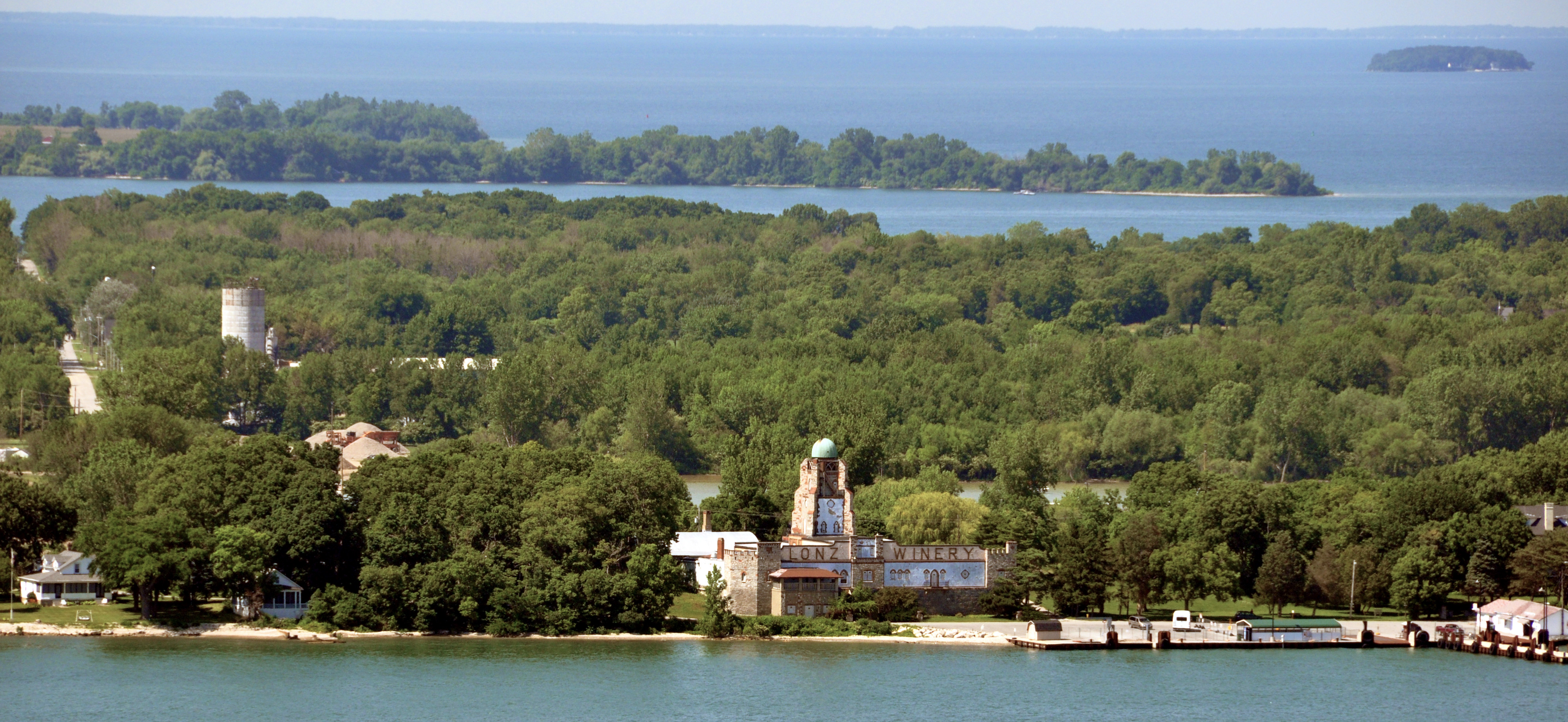
A view of the Lonz Winery in 2010

Lonz Winery has been renovated by the state of Ohio, and was reopened to the public on June 22, 2017. They are not producing or selling wine on site, but it is open for tours. The historic Lonz Mansion reopened to island visitors in 2024 as a first floor Prohibition-era museum and a second floor overnight stay.

== Tourism ==
Middle Bass is serviced by the Miller Boat Line from Catawba Island and the Middle Bass Ferry Line from Put-in-Bay. It is common to use Middle Bass as a less crowded base and then take the Sonny S (sole vessel of the Middle Bass Ferry Line) to Put-in-Bay for the day.

Middle Bass Island Airport has a 1852-foot runway with commercial air-taxi service. Middle Bass-East Point Airport offers a 2,085-foot turf runway.
