= Isle Saint George, Ohio =

Isle St. George, Ohio
- Unincorporated community
- Location of Isle Saint George within Ohio.
- Coordinates: 41°43′18″N 82°49′13″W
- Country: United States
- State: Ohio
- County: Ottawa
- Township: Put-in-Bay
- Elevation: 587 ft (179 m)
- Time zone: UTC-5 (Eastern (EST))
  - Summer (DST): UTC-4 (EDT)
- ZIP codes: 43436
- GNIS feature ID: 1061260

Isle St. George or Isle Saint George is an unincorporated community in Put-in-Bay Township, Ottawa County, Ohio, United States. It is the only community on North Bass Island in Lake Erie. The North Bass Island Post Office was established on May 25, 1864, and the name changed to Isle Saint George Post Office on March 2, 1874. The Isle Saint George ZIP code 43436 provides PO Box service.

== See also ==
- Isle St. George AVA
