= Middle Bass, Ohio =

Middle Bass
- Unincorporated community
- Location within the state of Ohio
- Coordinates: 41°40′44″N 82°48′44″W
- Country: United States
- State: Ohio
- County: Ottawa
- Township: Put-in-Bay
- Elevation: 581 ft (177 m)
- Time zone: UTC-5 (Eastern (EST))
  - Summer (DST): UTC-4 (EDT)
- ZIP codes: 43446
- GNIS feature ID: 1049671

Middle Bass is an unincorporated community in Put-in-Bay Township, Ottawa County, Ohio, United States. It is the only community on Middle Bass Island in Lake Erie. It has a post office with the ZIP code 43446.
