= Put-in-Bay Township, Ottawa County, Ohio =

Township in Ohio, US

Put-in-Bay Township, Ohio
- Township
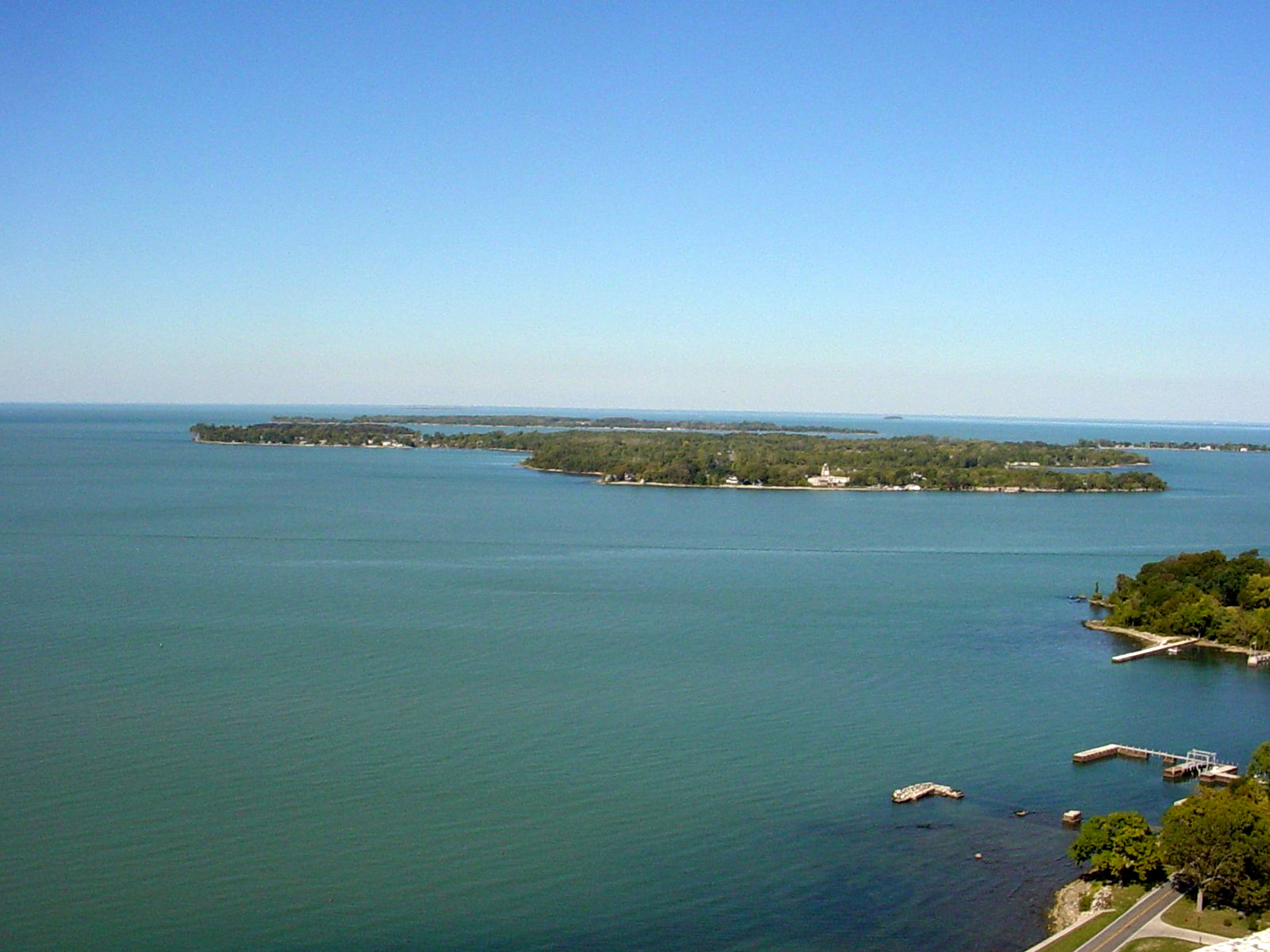
- Middle Bass Island, seen from Perry's Victory Monument on South Bass Island

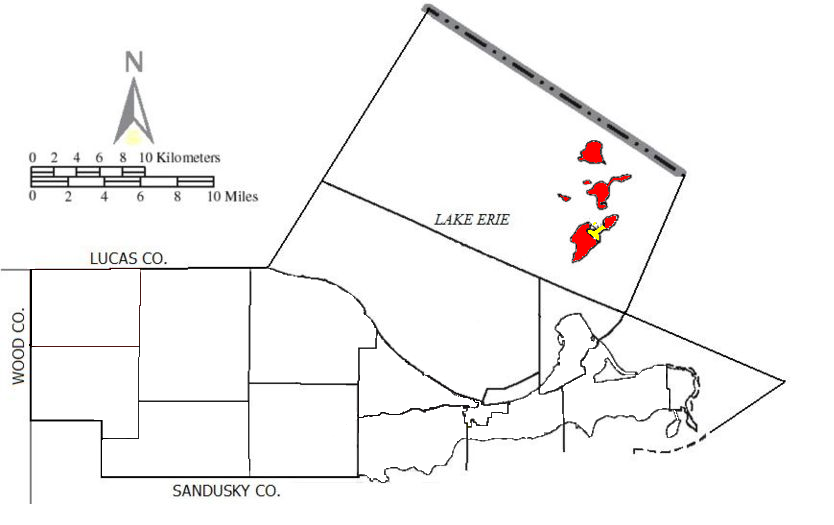
- Location of Put-in-Bay Township (red) in Ottawa County, next to the village of Put-in-Bay (yellow)
- Coordinates: 41°40′18″N 82°48′46″W
- Country: United States
- State: Ohio
- County: Ottawa

Area
  - Total: 168.8 sq mi (437.2 km^{2})
  - Land: 5.0 sq mi (13.0 km^{2})
  - Water: 163.8 sq mi (424.2 km^{2})
- Elevation: 571 ft (174 m)

Population (2020)
  - Total: 813
  - Density: 162/sq mi (62.5/km^{2})
- Time zone: UTC-5 (Eastern (EST))
  - Summer (DST): UTC-4 (EDT)
- ZIP code: 43456
- Area code: 419
- FIPS code: 39-65046
- GNIS feature ID: 1086764
- Website: http://www.pibtownship.com/

Put-in-Bay Township is one of the twelve townships of Ottawa County, Ohio, United States. The 2020 census found 813 people in the township.

== Communities ==
- Put-in-Bay is a village located at 41°39′11″N 82°49′3″W within the southern portion of the township. Put-In-Bay is located on the center of South Bass Island.
- Gibraltar Island is an unincorporated community located on Gibraltar Island. The Ohio State University's Stone Laboratory is located in Gibraltar Island. The summer house of Jay Cooke is located in Gibraltar Island.
- Isle Saint George is an unincorporated community located at 41°43′18″N 82°49′13″W within the northern portion of the township on North Bass Island.
- Middle Bass is an unincorporated community located at 41°40′44″N 82°48′44″W within the center of the township on Middle Bass Island.

== Geography ==
=== Islands ===
The township is composed of several islands located in Lake Erie, northeast of the rest of the county:

- South Bass Island
- Middle Bass Island
- North Bass Island
- Rattlesnake Island
- Sugar Island
- Green Island
- Ballast Island

=== Boundaries ===
It has the following water boundaries:

- Ontario, Canada - northeast
- Kelleys Island - east
- Catawba Island Township - southeast
- Portage Township - south
- Erie Township - southwest, southeast of Erie Township
- Carroll Township - southwest, northwest of Erie Township
- Jerusalem Township, Lucas County - northwest

Several communities are located in Put-in-Bay Township: the popular tourist village of Put-in-Bay on South Bass Island, and the unincorporated communities of Middle Bass on Middle Bass Island and Isle St. George on North Bass Island.

Transportation is provided by private air service to several airports on the islands, including Put-in-Bay airport, from Erie-Ottawa International Airport in Port Clinton, the Miller Boat Line from Catawba Island to Put-in-Bay and Middle Bass Island, and the Jet Express ferry from Port Clinton and Sandusky to Put-in-Bay, Kelleys Island, and Cedar Point.

=== AVAs ===
One American Viticultural Area has been established in the township:

- Isle St. George AVA

== Demographics ==
=== 2010 ===
As of the census of 2010, there were 633 people, 313 households, and 184 families residing in the township. The racial makeup of the township was 99.1% White, 0.3% Asian, Hispanic or Latino of any race were 0.5% of the population.

There were 633 households, out of which 46.2% had children under the age of 18 living with them, 58.8% were married couples living together, 19.8% had a female householder with no husband present.

== Name and history ==
It is the only Put-in-Bay Township statewide.

== Government ==
The township is governed by a three-member board of trustees, who are elected in November of odd-numbered years to a four-year term beginning on the following January 1. Two are elected in the year after the presidential election and one is elected in the year before it. There is also an elected township fiscal officer, who serves a four-year term beginning on April 1 of the year after the election, which is held in November of the year before the presidential election. Vacancies in the fiscal officership or on the board of trustees are filled by the remaining trustees.
