= Sugar Island (Ohio) =

Private island located in Lake Erie, Ottawa County, Ohio

Coordinates: 41.6920°N 82.8260°W

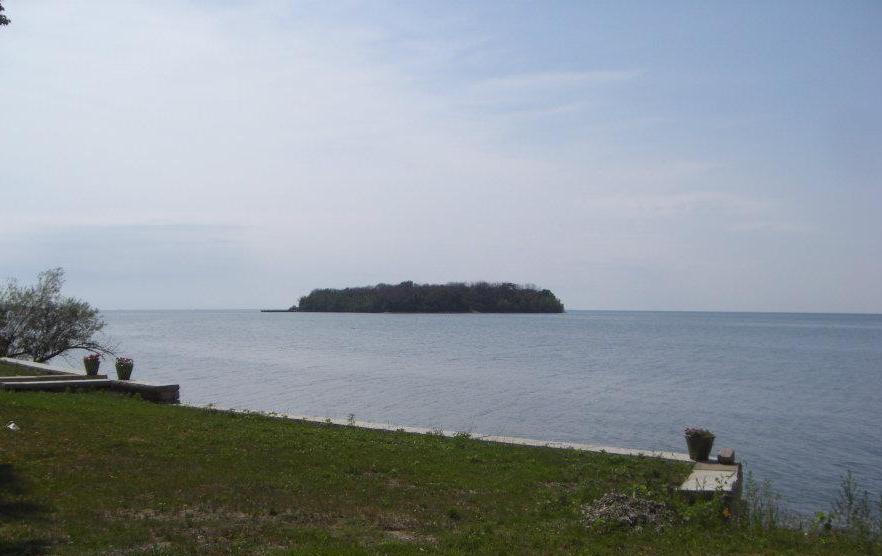
Sugar Island viewed from Middle Bass Island.

Sugar Island of Ottawa County, Ohio, United States in southwestern Lake Erie. It is a private island owned by the Keny family, and one of the smaller of the island group at 0.123 km² (30.39 acres). It lies just off the northwest shore of Middle Bass Island. It is located in Put-in-Bay Township, Ottawa County, Ohio. Originally, it was part of a hunting club, before being purchased by Gebhard Keny, the founder of Columbus Plastic Products, original producer of Lustro-Ware, an early version of Tupperware.

Sugar Island was once part of Middle Bass Island, connected by way of a short isthmus. As trees were lumbered from this strip of connecting land, Lake Erie began to reclaim the newly exposed, loose soil. Thus, the connecting isthmus sank into the lake, leaving Sugar Island separate from Middle Bass Island.
