= South Bass Island =

Island in the United States of America

Coordinates: 41.6497°N 82.8189°W

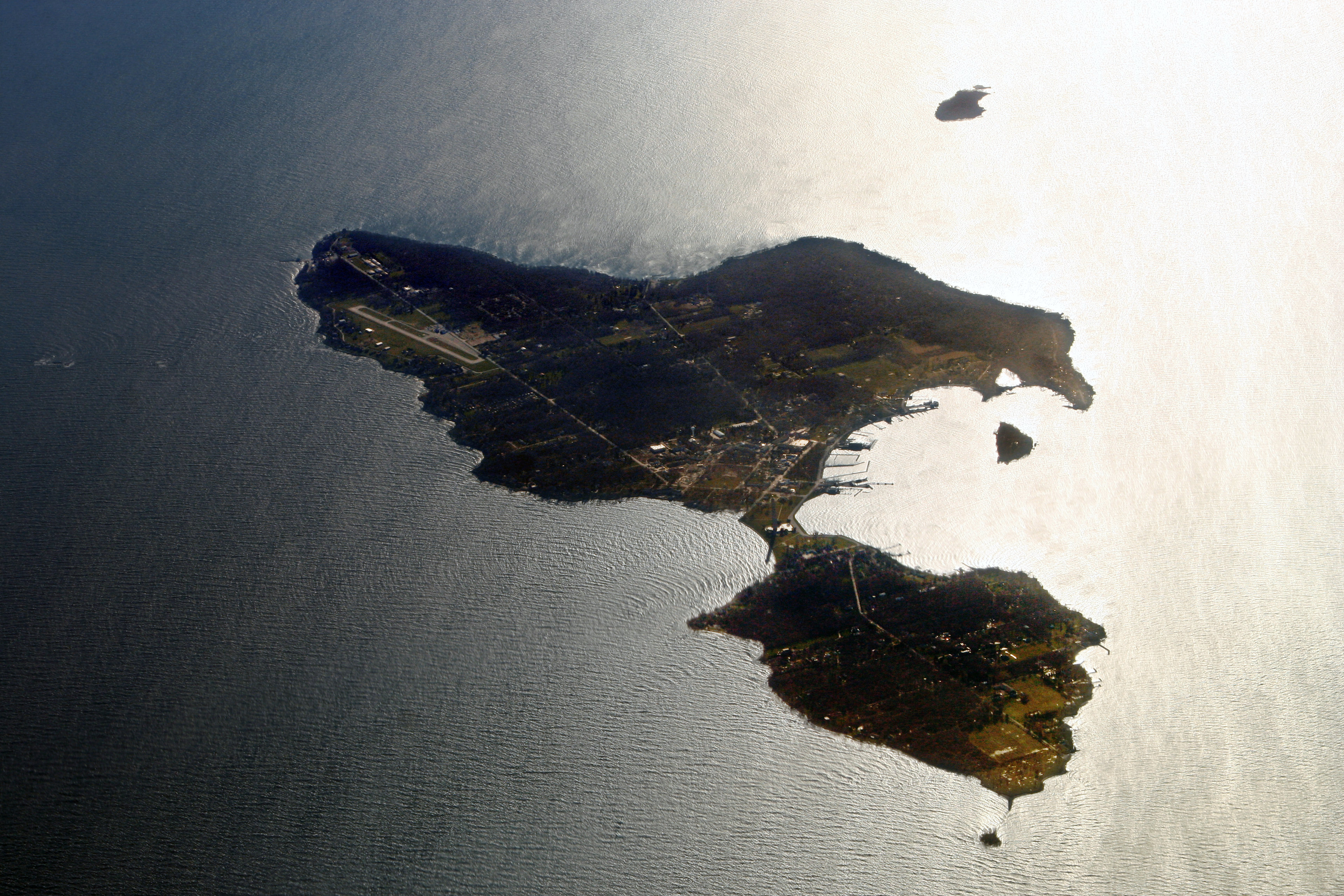
South Bass Island from the air, looking west, over Put-in-Bay.

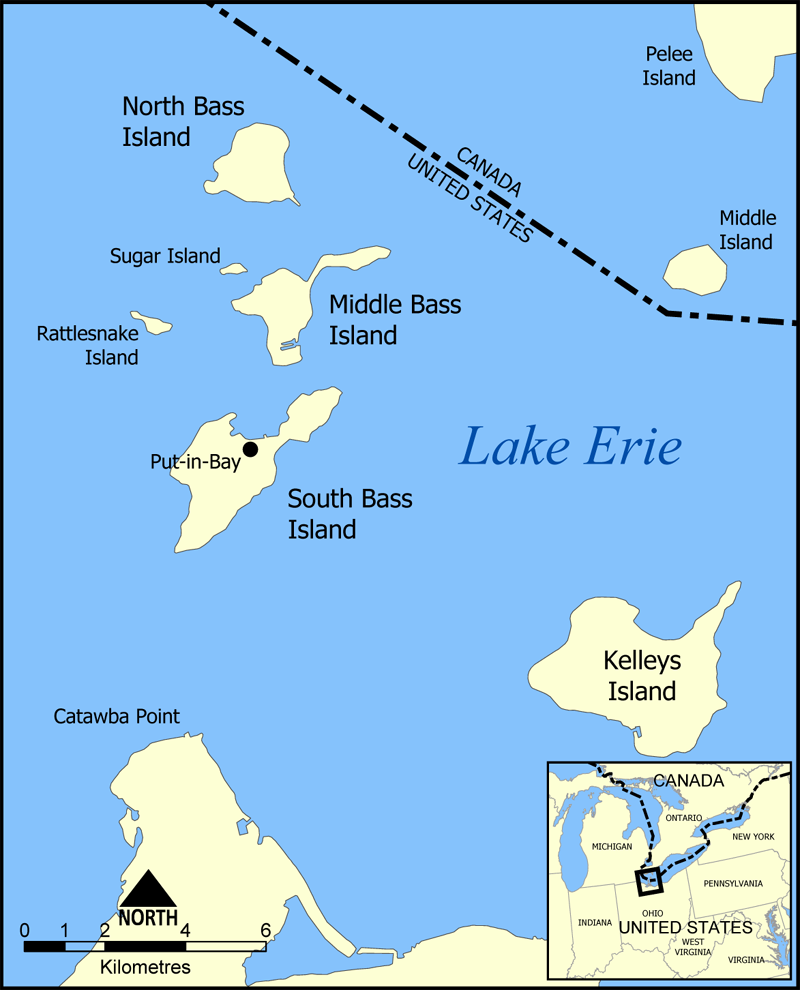
Map of the Bass Islands.

South Bass Island is a small island in western Lake Erie, and a part of Ottawa County, Ohio, United States. It is the southernmost of the three Bass Islands and located 3 miles (4.6 km) from the south shore of Lake Erie. It is the third largest island in the Lake Erie Islands, and is part of Put-in-Bay Township. In the bay of South Bass is Gibraltar Island, home to the Ohio State University's Stone Laboratory.

The island is a popular recreation spot and is often referred to as the "Key West of Lake Erie." The village of Put-in-Bay is a popular tourist destination during the summer. It is served by ferry from nearby Port Clinton and Sandusky, both on the mainland. The island is the annual host of the Inter-Lake Yachting Association regatta, known as Bay Week.

Perry's Victory and International Peace Memorial, including Perry's Monument, commemorates the Battle of Lake Erie, which the United States won during the War of 1812. It is located on South Bass Island, near Put-In-Bay.

== Geography ==
Approximately 3.7 miles (6.0 km) long and 1.5 miles (2.4 km) wide and comprises 1,588.3 acres (642.8 hectares), the island is separated by an isthmus into a smaller, residential northeastern side (East Point) and a southwestern side that contains an airfield and the village center of Put-in-Bay, the island's only incorporated community. The island is 3 miles (4.8 km) north of the nearest point on the mainland (Scott Point in the peninsular Catawba Island Township) and approximately 10 miles (16 km) north northeast of Port Clinton, Ohio, and 14 miles (23 km) north northwest of Sandusky, Ohio. As of the 2000 census there were 631 residents on the island.

== Access ==
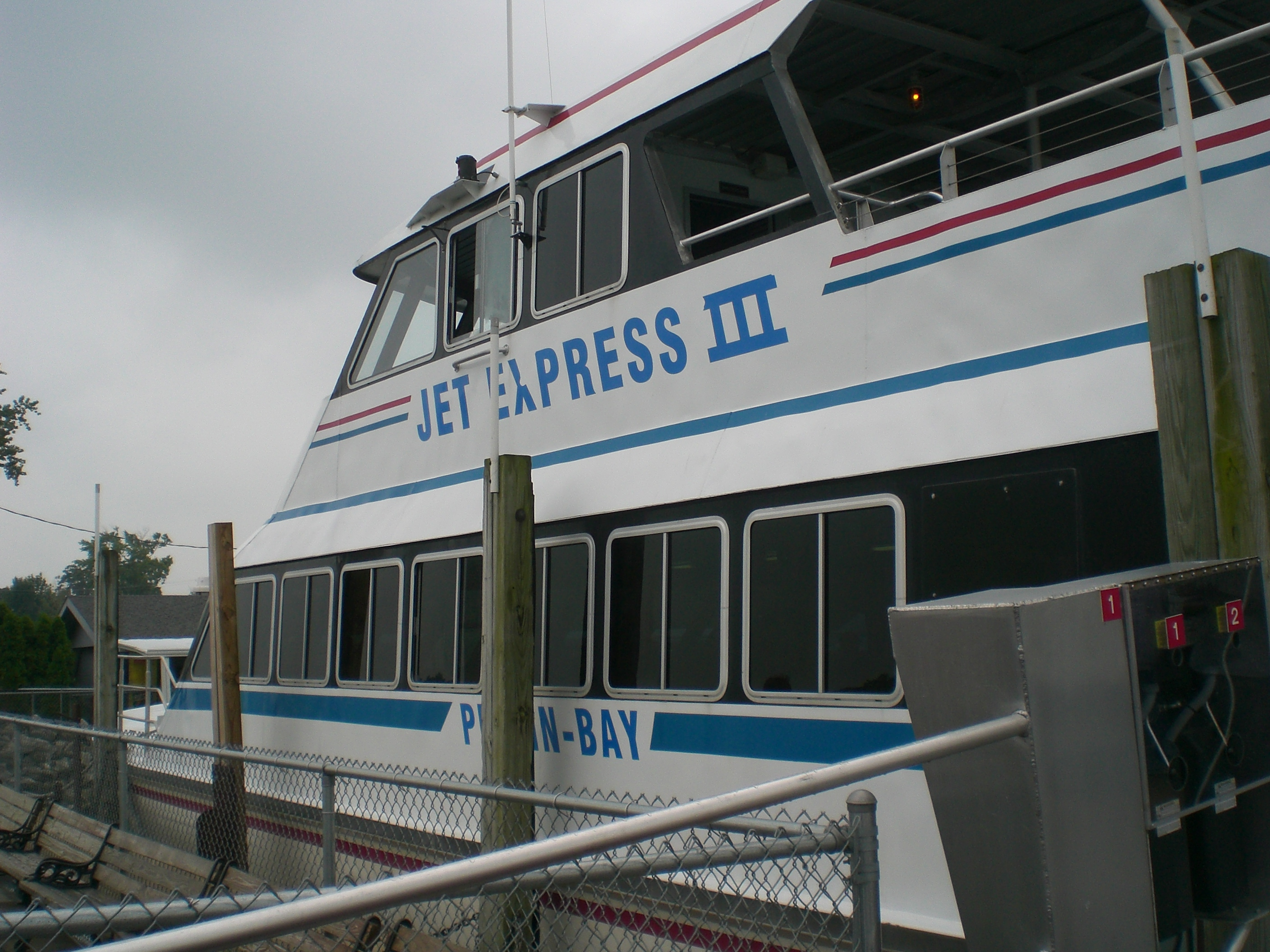
The Jet Express provides high speed ferry service from Port Clinton, or Sandusky to Cedar Point, Kelleys Island, and Put-in-Bay.

Transportation to the island via car, bike, or walk-ons is provided by ferries from the Miller Boat Line (departing from the northern point of Catawba Island), and the Jet Express a high speed passenger ferry service (departing from the mainland ports of Port Clinton and Sandusky.) Other boat access is provided by various charter boat companies in the area. The island also has a small airport. Golf carts are a popular method of transportation on the island.

== Notable residents ==
- John Brown Jr.

== See also ==
- Green Island (Ohio)
- South Bass Island Light, a lighthouse
- Populated islands of the Great Lakes

== Representation in other media ==
- Pamela F. Service's 'tween' novel Phantom Victory (1994), features a main character, Terri, who lives on South Bass Island and works at the excavation of the historic Victory hotel, which burned down in 1919.

== Gallery ==
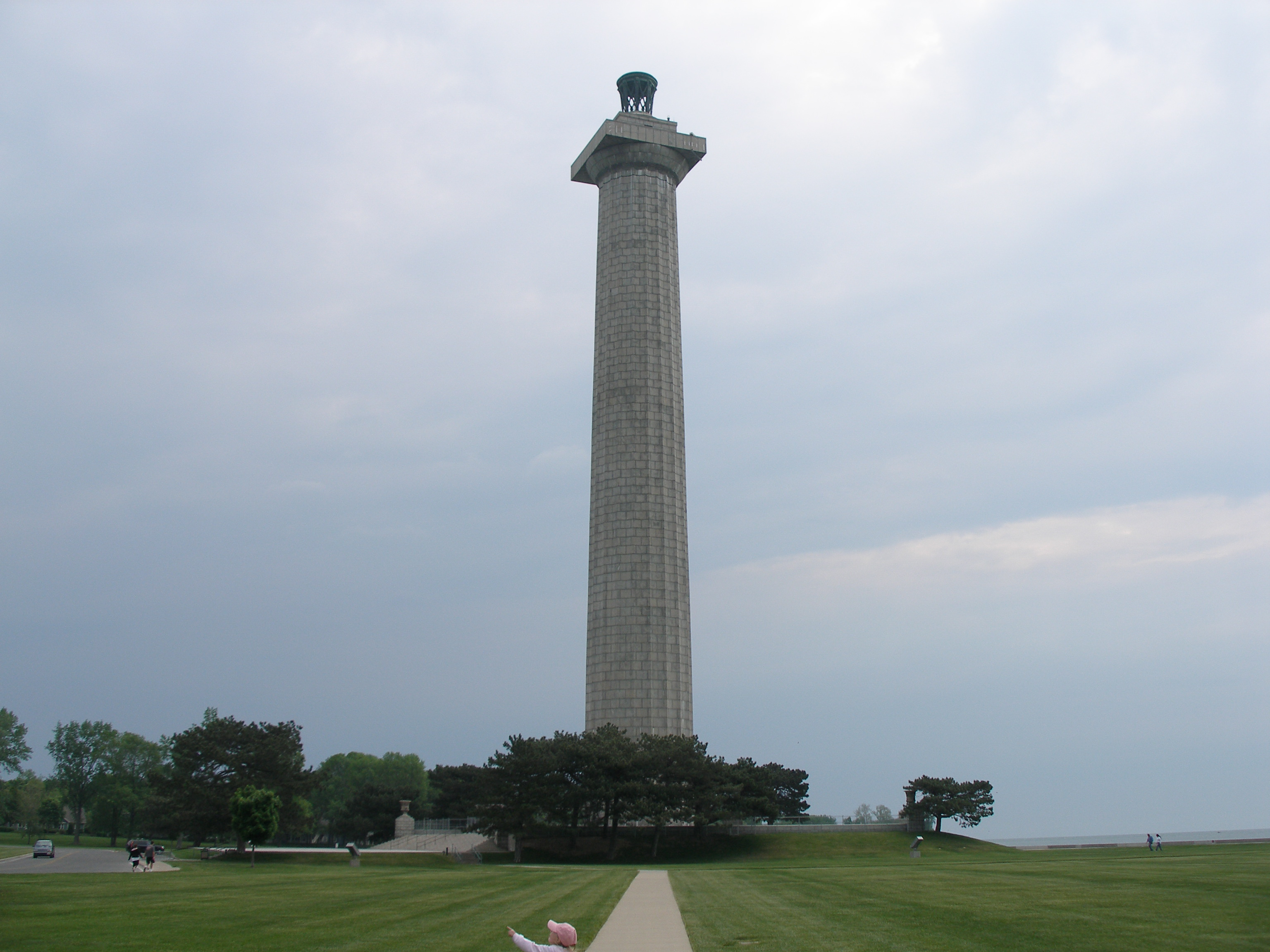
The 352-foot (107 m) Perry's Victory and International Peace Memorial in Put-in-Bay village.

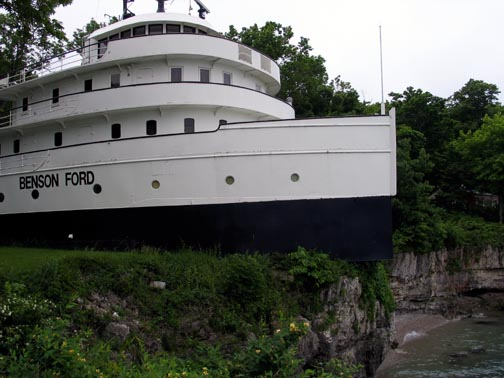
The former MV Benson Ford, a lake freighter, has been adapted as a tourist attraction on the island.

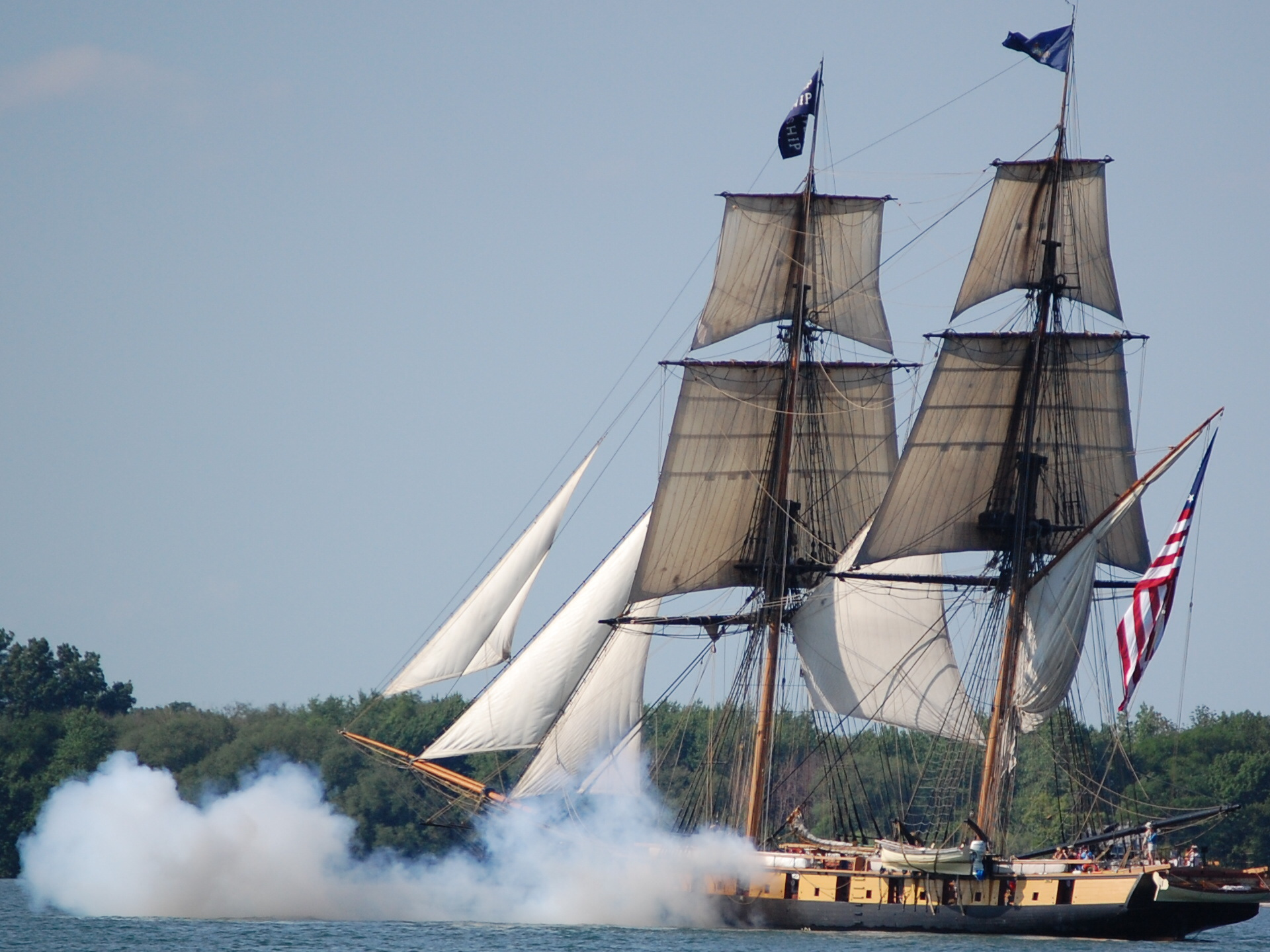
The U.S. Brig Niagara firing its cannons, off Put-in-Bay harbor
