= Catawba Island Township, Ohio =

Township in Ohio, US

Catawba Island Township, Ottawa County, Ohio
- Township
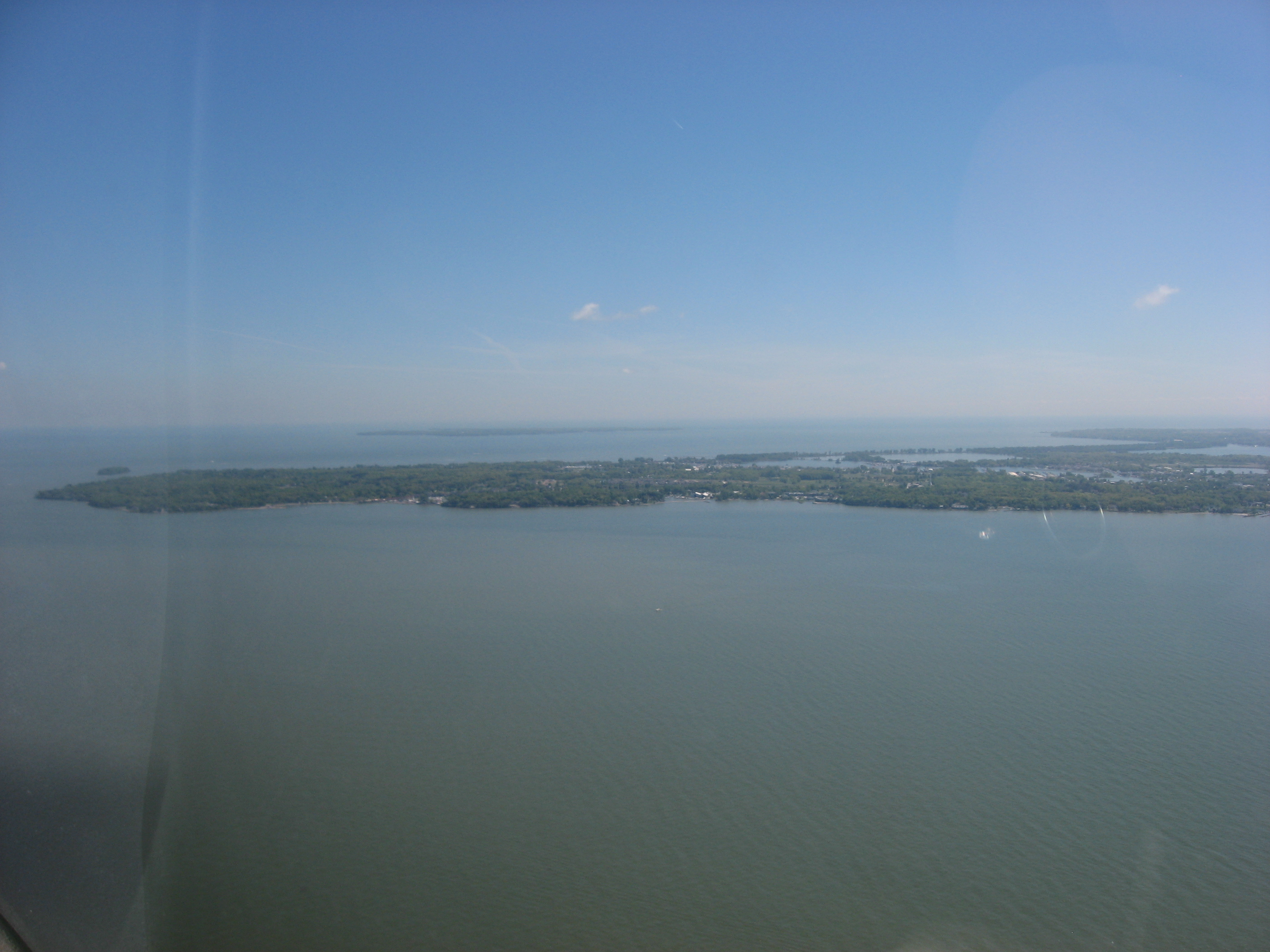
- Aerial view of Catawba Island from the west

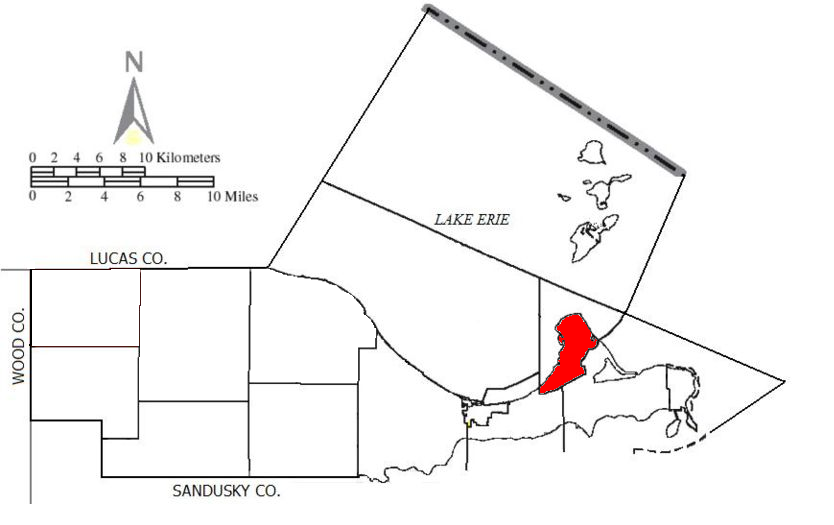
- Location of Catawba Island Township in Ottawa County
- Coordinates: 41°33′49″N 82°50′20″W
- Country: United States
- State: Ohio
- County: Ottawa

Area
  - Total: 16.9 sq mi (43.8 km^{2})
  - Land: 5.7 sq mi (14.8 km^{2})
  - Water: 11.2 sq mi (29.1 km^{2})
- Elevation: 581 ft (177 m)

Population (2020)
  - Total: 3,711
  - Density: 649/sq mi (250.7/km^{2})
- Time zone: UTC-5 (Eastern (EST))
  - Summer (DST): UTC-4 (EDT)
- ZIP code: 43452
- Area code: 419
- FIPS code: 39-12588
- GNIS feature ID: 1086758
- Website: http://www.catawbaislandtownship.com/

Catawba Island Township is one of the twelve townships of Ottawa County, Ohio, United States. The 2020 census found 3,711 people in the township.

== Communities ==
Catawba Island is an unincorporated community located in the northern portion of the township and the northern portion of the Catawba Island peninsula. The Catawba Island ferry terminal is located within the unincorporated community; the Miller Boat Line runs from the terminal to the Put-in-Bay, Ohio ferry terminal and the Middle Bass, Ohio ferry terminal. The Catawba Island Nature Preserve is also located within the unincorporated community.

== Geography ==
The township is located in the northeastern part of the county on the northern point of the Marblehead Peninsula, presently forming its own peninsula into Lake Erie, but formerly it was an actual island. It borders the following townships:

- Put-in-Bay Township – north, across Lake Erie
- Kelleys Island – northeast, across Lake Erie
- Danbury Township – southeast
- Portage Township – southwest

No municipalities are located in Catawba Island Township.

== Name and history ==
It is the only Catawba Island Township statewide. The township's website claims that it was named for the variety of grapes that grew plentifully there, however, another source claims that it is named for the Catawba tribe, who live in the Carolinas but descend from the Ohio Valley. Old newspaper articles refer to Rattlesnake Island as once being inhabited by the Catawba tribe.

Although currently not an actual island, it is presently a peninsula. In prehistoric times, the Portage River is thought to have flowed into Lake Erie at the West Harbor (near East Harbor State Park), and this old channel of the river (which was also denoted on 19th-century maps) formerly made Catawba into a true island. All that currently remains of most of the old riverbed is an insignificant ditch. Prior to about 1804, the British seem to have referred to this island as Cunningham's Island (but, later, that name seems to have been briefly transferred to present-day Kelleys Island, which had formerly been named Sandusky Island in the 18th-century).

A large section of this township is within the Firelands region (the westernmost area of the Connecticut Western Reserve), and was originally a part of Danbury Township.

== Government ==
The township is governed by a three-member board of trustees, who are elected in November of odd-numbered years to a four-year term beginning on the following January 1. Two are elected in the year after the presidential election and one is elected in the year before it. There is also an elected township fiscal officer, who serves a four-year term beginning on April 1 of the year after the election, which is held in November of the year before the presidential election. Vacancies in the fiscal officership or on the board of trustees are filled by the remaining trustees.

== Tourism and recreation ==
Catawba Island is a very popular summer destination as part of Ohio's Vacationland region. The long and protected shoreline provides multiple marinas and cottage communities. The Lake Erie Islands including the Bass Islands, Kelleys, and Pelee are all easily accessible.

== See also ==
- Catawba Island State Park
