= Central Basin of Lake Erie =

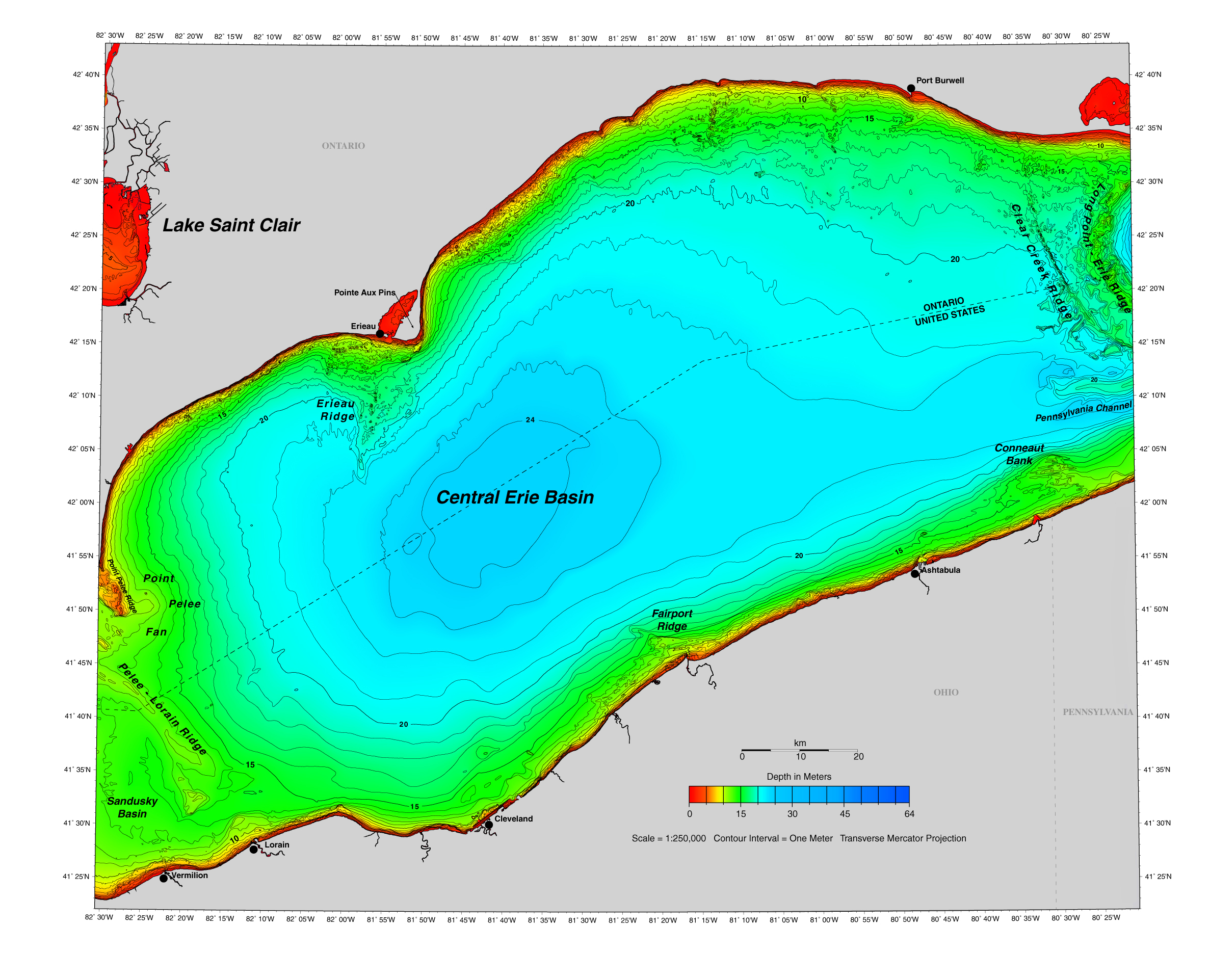
Bathymetric map of the Central Basin of Lake Erie

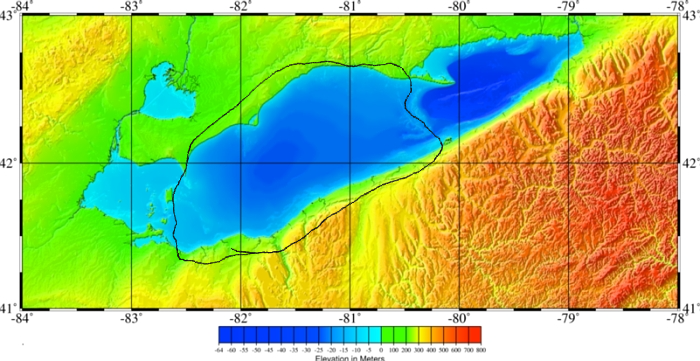
Relief map showing depths of Lake Erie (Central Basin circled)

The Central Basin is the middle portion of Lake Erie, extending from the Bass Islands in Ohio to the Pennsylvania shoreline. It features deeper waters, seasonal thermal stratification, and periodic low-oxygen (hypoxic) zones, distinguishing it from the shallow Western Basin and the even deeper Eastern Basin.

== Geography and Bathymetry ==
The Central Basin spans from Cedar Point and the Bass Islands to the vicinity of Erie, Pennsylvania. Its average depth is about 60 feet (18 meters), with maximum depths reaching up to 90 feet (27 meters). During summer, the water column often stratifies, forming distinct thermal layers that influence oxygen distribution and biological activity.

== Hypoxia and Internal Phosphorus Cycling ==
Since the 1990s, the Central Basin has experienced seasonal hypoxia, particularly in late summer. These “dead zones” lack sufficient dissolved oxygen for most aquatic life and have expanded to cover over 10,000 km² in some years. Scientific reviews suggest that hypoxia is primarily driven by nutrient loading, especially phosphorus. Reductions of 46% in total phosphorus and 78% in dissolved reactive phosphorus compared to 2005–2011 averages are recommended to limit hypoxic extent.

== Harmful Algal Blooms ==
Although most algal blooms occur in the Western Basin, blooms of Dolichospermum and Microcystis have been detected in the Central Basin. These organisms produce toxins, including microcystins and neurotoxins, that are not consistently monitored in the region.

== Nutrient Inputs and Sediment Release ==
A large amount of phosphorus in the Central Basin originates from agricultural runoff, but 8–20% comes from internal loading—phosphorus released from lake sediments. Lake sediments usually sink and collect at the lake bottom. Internal phosphorus loading from sediments at the lake bottom can range from 300 to 2,400 metric tons annually, making cleanup and restoration more difficult.

== Wildlife and Monitoring ==
The basin supports migratory bird species such as gulls, loons, and mergansers. To monitor oxygen levels and stratification, a network of long-term EPA and USGS monitoring stations collects biweekly data.

== Restoration and Management ==
Under the revised Great Lakes Water Quality Agreement (2012), Canada and the U.S. aim to reduce phosphorus loading by 40% to both the Western and Central Basins to address hypoxia and algal blooms. Agricultural best practices and wetland restoration are central to achieving these targets, though wide-scale adoption remains a challenge.
