= Lorain West Breakwater Light =

Lighthouse in Lorain, Ohio, US

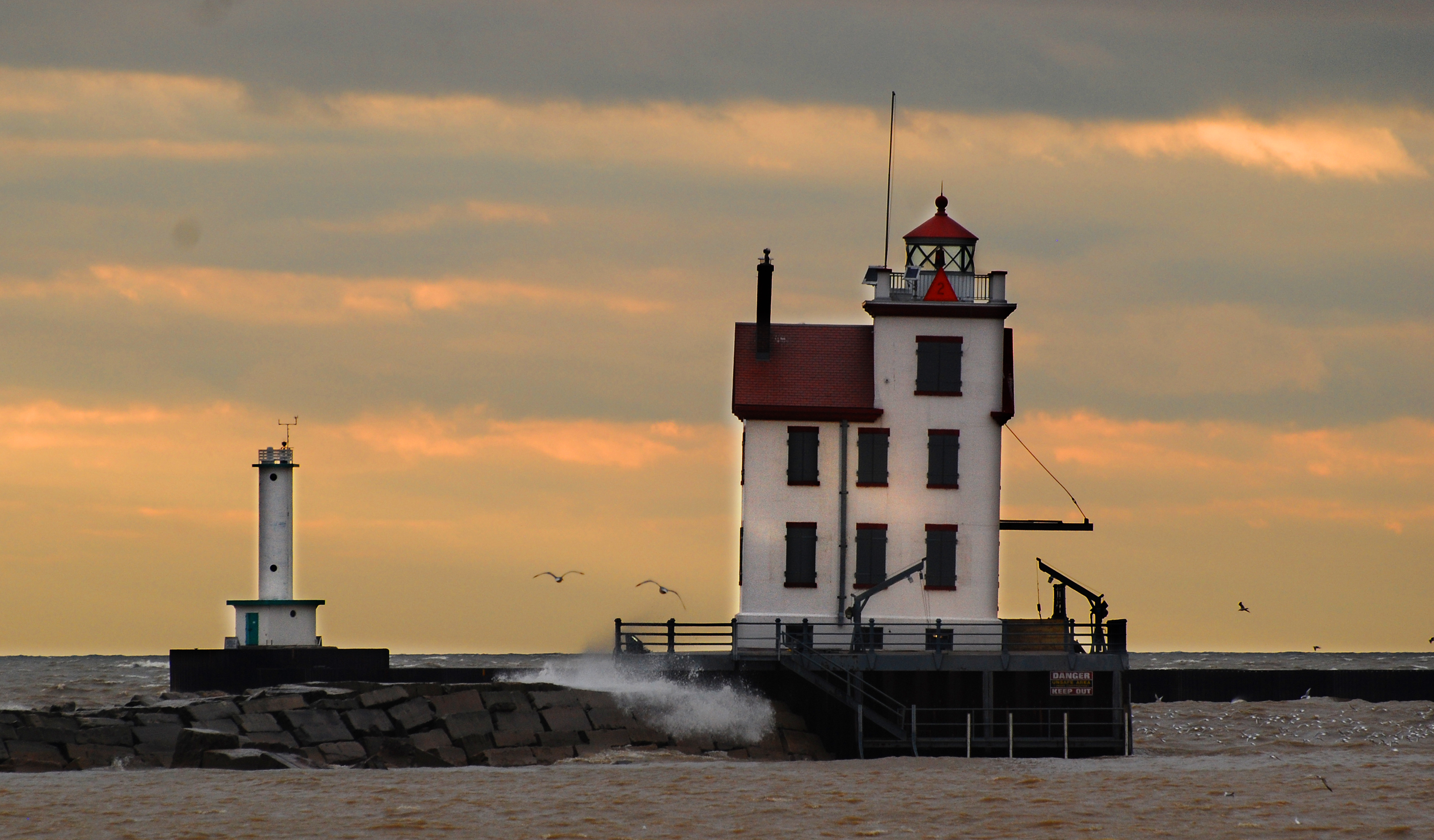
- Lorain Light
- Location: Lorain, Ohio, United States
- Coordinates: 41°28′39.28″N 82°11′25.90″W

Tower
- Constructed: 1917
- Foundation: Concrete Pier
- Construction: Concrete with steel reinforcing
- Height: 51 feet (16 m)
- Shape: Square
- Markings: White with red trim
- Heritage: National Register of Historic Places listed place
- Fog signal: Horn

Light
- First lit: 2001
- Deactivated: 1965
- Focal height: 17.5 m (57 ft)
- Lens: Fourth order Fresnel
- Range: 6 nmi (11 km; 6.9 mi)
- Characteristic: Fl R 4s
- Lorain Lighthouse
- U.S. National Register of Historic Places
- Area: less than one acre
- Built: 1909
- NRHP reference No.: 78002108
- Added to NRHP: 29 December 1978

The Lorain West Breakwater Light, also called the Lorain Harbor Light, is a lighthouse in Lorain, Ohio, United States. The light was built in 1917 on Lake Erie by the United States Army Corps of Engineers. It was taken out of service in 1965 when it was replaced by an automated light tower on a nearby breakwater. The light was added to the National Register of Historic Places in 1978.

== History ==
The 1917 lighthouse is the fourth lighthouse built to service the City of Lorain's Black River port, with the first being constructed in 1836.

Funding for the fourth lighthouse was appropriated by Congress in 1913 and construction began in 1916. A temporary light was installed in 1917 and the lens was installed in 1918.

After an automated light tower was installed in 1965, the 1917 light was decommissioned and marked for demolition. The demolition had to be rescheduled for the following year after the project was delayed by a storm. During that time, the Lorain community was able to mobilize to save the lighthouse as a historical landmark for the City of Lorain.

The original lens was a fourth order, Fresnel that was installed in 1918. When the lighthouse was decommissioned, the Fresnel lens was put in storage in Cleveland by the Coast Guard. It was loaned to the historical society for the Charlotte-Genesse Lighthouse in New York as part of a renovation campaign in 1984. After a dispute over ownership, the original Lorain Fresnel lens was returned to Lorain in 2014 and is on display inside the Lorain Port Authority.

The Lorain Lighthouse has been managed by the Lorain Lighthouse Foundation (formerly Port of Lorain Foundation) since 1990. The lighthouse has won "best lighthouse" by Lake Erie Living Magazine in 2013–2024.
