= Lake Erie =

One of the Great Lakes in North America

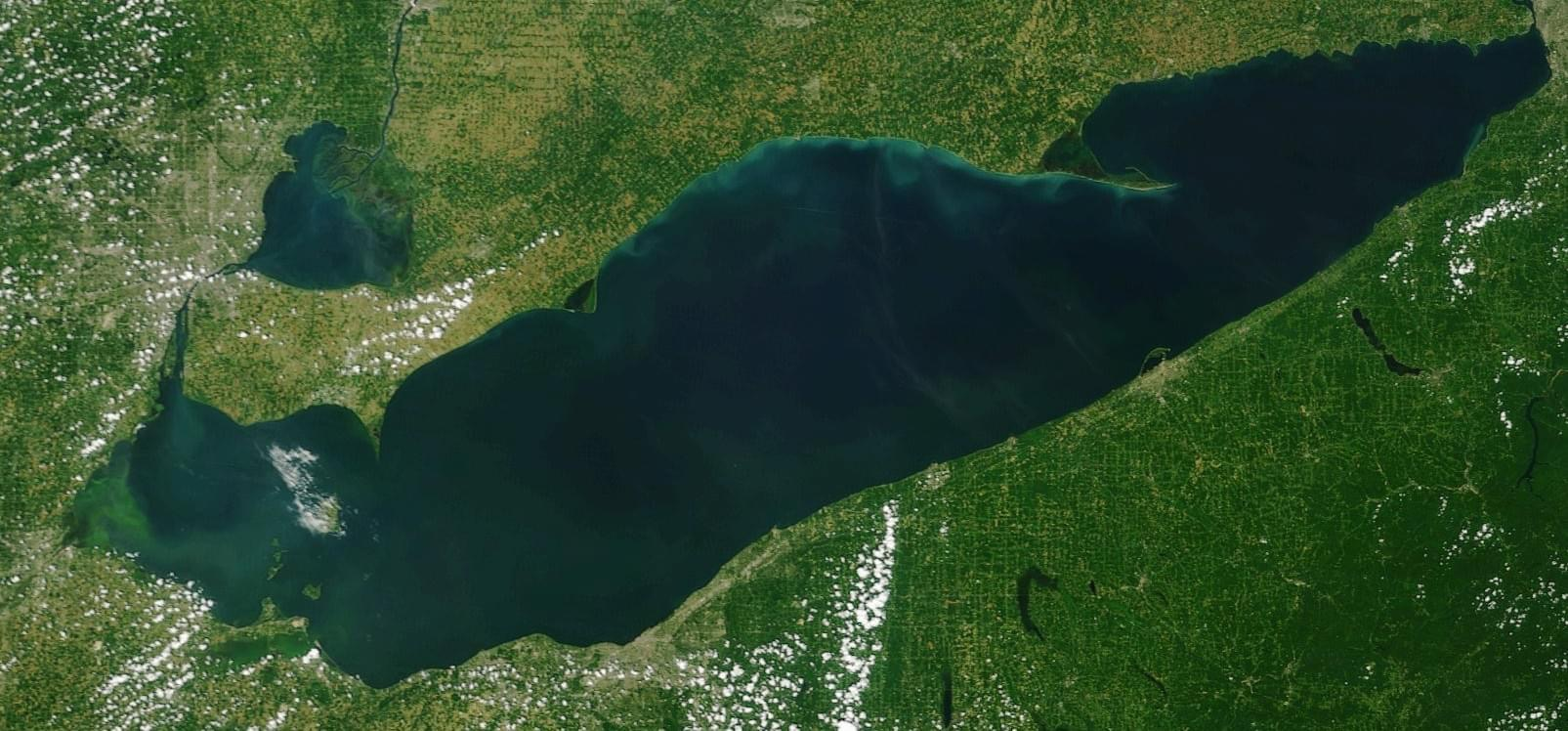
- NOAA satellite image of Lake Erie from July 7, 2023. Light green swirls are algae bloom on the western edge of the lake.

- Location within North America

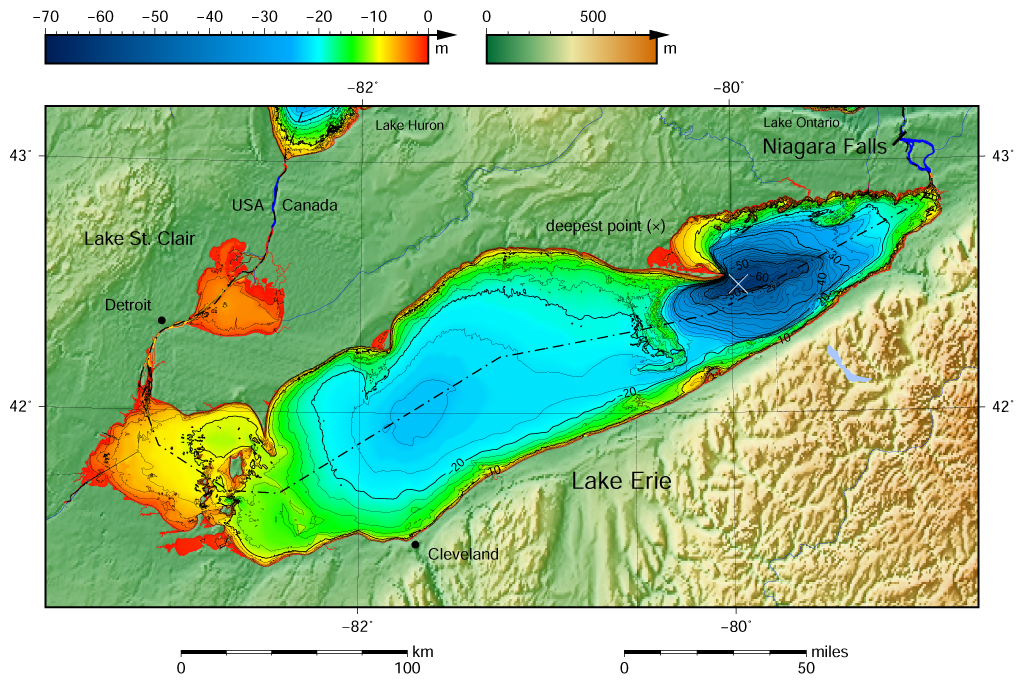
- Lake Erie and Lake Saint Clair bathymetric map. The deepest point is marked with "×".
- Location: North America
- Group: Great Lakes
- Coordinates: 42.2°N 81.2°W
- Lake type: Glacial
- Primary inflows: Detroit River
- Primary outflows: Niagara River; Welland Canal
- Basin countries: Canada; United States
- Max. length: 241 mi (388 km)
- Max. width: 57 mi (92 km)
- Surface area: 9,910 square miles (25,667 km^{2}) (total); 4,990 square miles (13,000 km^{2}) (American side); 4,950 square miles (13,000 km^{2}) (Canadian side)
- Average depth: 62 ft (19 m)
- Max. depth: 210 ft (64 m)
- Water volume: 116 cu mi (480 km^{3})
- Residence time: 2.6 years
- Shore length^{1}: 799 mi (1,286 km) plus 72 mi (116 km) for islands
- Surface elevation: 569 ft (173 m)
- Islands: 24+ (see list)
- Settlements: Cleveland, Ohio; Buffalo, New York; Erie, Pennsylvania; Toledo, Ohio; Monroe, Michigan; Leamington, Ontario; Port Colborne, Ontario
- ^{1} Shore length is not a well-defined measure.

The Great Lakes, with Lake Erie highlighted in darker blue

Lake Erie (/ˈɪəri/ EER-ee) is the fourth-largest lake by surface area of the five Great Lakes in North America and the eleventh-largest globally. It is the southernmost, shallowest, and smallest by volume of the Great Lakes and also has the shortest average water residence time. At its deepest point, Lake Erie is 210 feet (64 m) deep, making it the only Great Lake whose deepest point is above sea level.

Located on the International Boundary between Canada and the United States, Lake Erie's northern shore is the Canadian province of Ontario, specifically the Ontario Peninsula, with the U.S. states of Michigan, Ohio, Pennsylvania, and New York on its western, southern, and eastern shores. These jurisdictions divide the surface area of the lake with water boundaries. The largest city on the lake is Cleveland, anchoring the third largest U.S. metro area in the Great Lakes region, after Greater Chicago and Metro Detroit. Other major cities along the lake shore include Buffalo, New York; Erie, Pennsylvania; and Toledo, Ohio.

Situated below Lake Huron, Erie's primary inlet is the Detroit River. The main natural outflow from the lake is via the Niagara River, which provides hydroelectric power to Canada and the U.S. as it spins huge turbines near Niagara Falls at Lewiston, New York, and Queenston, Ontario. Some outflow occurs via the Welland Canal, part of the Saint Lawrence Seaway, which diverts water for ship passages from Port Colborne, Ontario, on Lake Erie, to St. Catharines on Lake Ontario, an elevation difference of 326 ft (99 m). Lake Erie's environmental health has been an ongoing concern for decades, with issues such as overfishing, pollution, algae blooms, aquatic invasive species, and eutrophication generating headlines.

== Etymology ==
Lake Erie appeared on maps as Lac du Chat as early as 1650. René de Bréhant de Galinée recorded the name of the lake as Lac Érié around 1670. The name Erie is derived from the Iroquoian word erielhonan, meaning "long tail".

== Geography ==
=== Geographic features ===
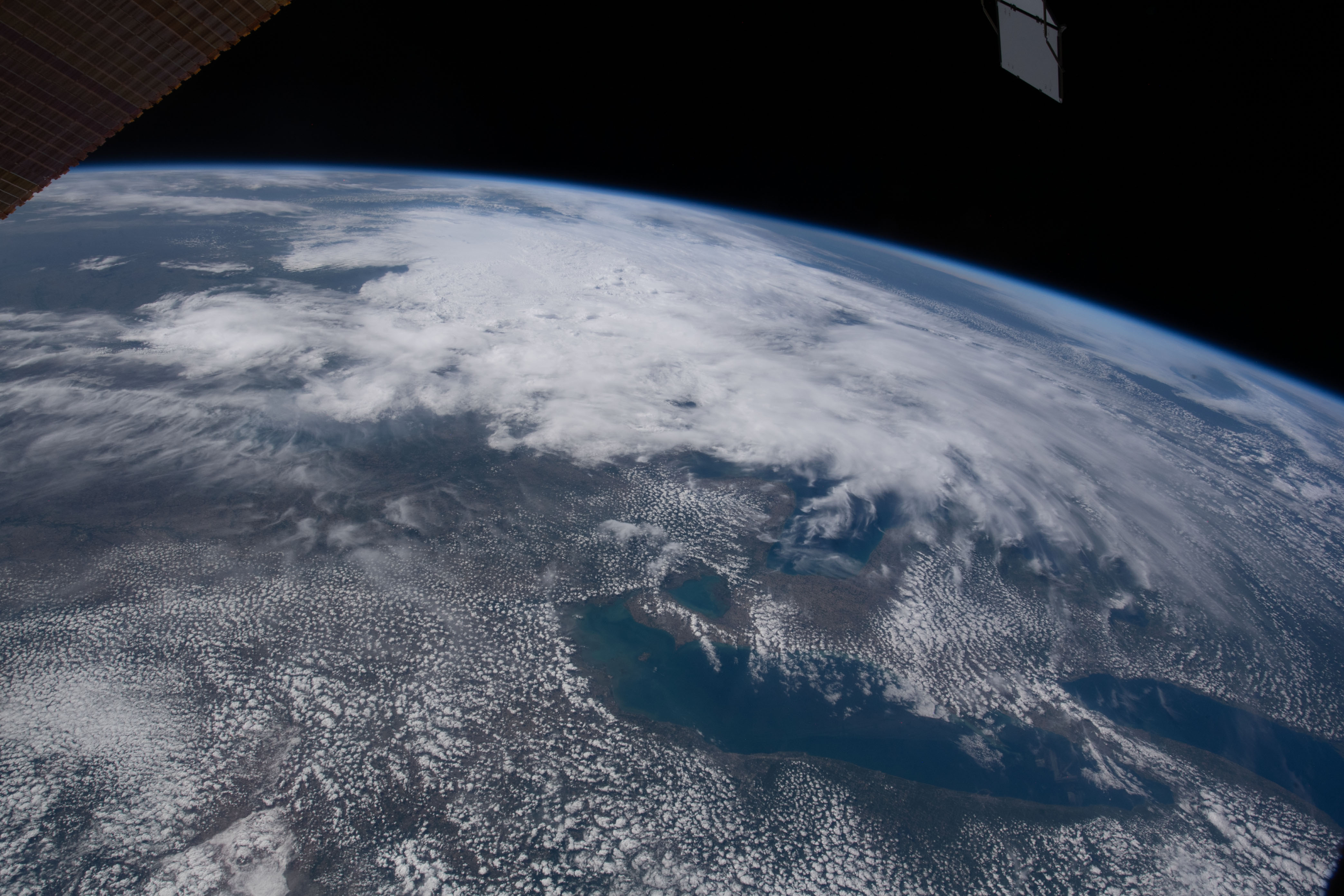
Lake Erie on May 28, 2022, taken from the International Space Station

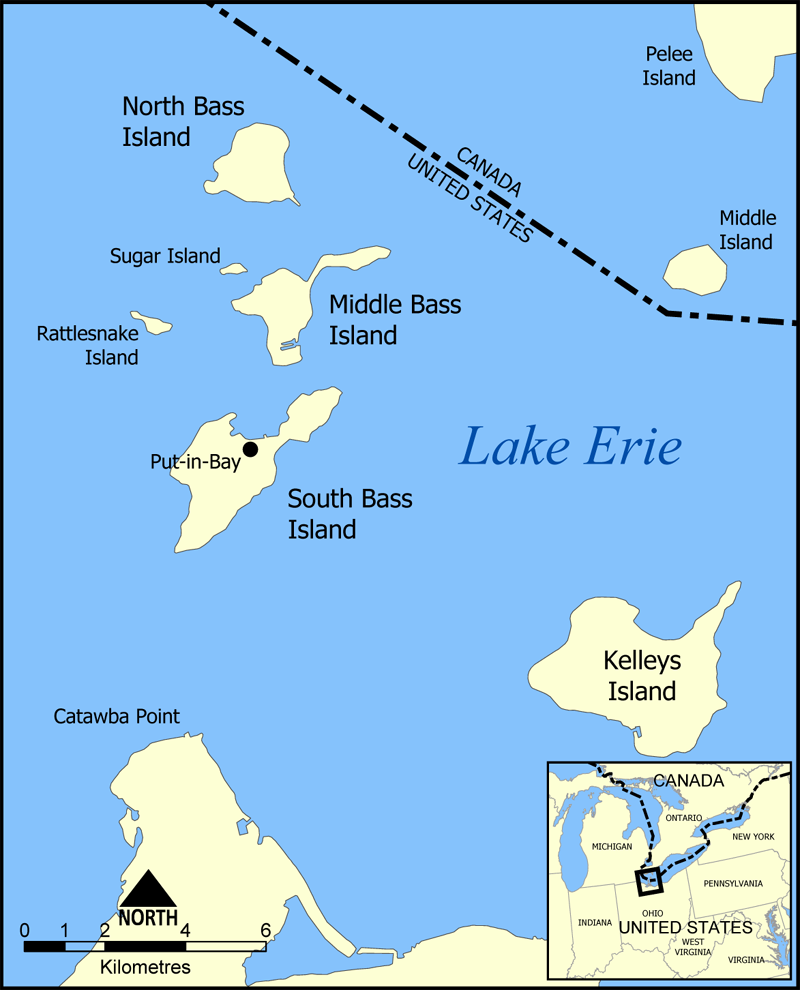
Partial map of the Lake Erie Islands

Lake Erie (42.2°N 81.2°W) has a mean elevation of 571 feet (174 m) above sea level. It has a surface area of 9,910 square miles (26,000 km^{2}), of which about 4,990 square miles (13,000 km^{2}) is in the United States and 4,950 square miles (13,000 km^{2}) is in Canada. Lake Erie has a length of 241 statute miles (388 km; 209 nmi) and breadth of 57 statute miles (92 km; 50 nmi) at its widest points. It is the shallowest of the Great Lakes with an average depth of 10 fathoms 3 feet or 63 ft (19 m) and a maximum depth of 35 fathoms (210 ft; 64 m) Although Lake Erie is the shallowest of the Great Lakes, its basin lies at a relatively high elevation; the lake's deepest point remains above the surface elevation of Lake Ontario, into which the Great Lakes system drains via the Niagara River and Niagara Falls.

Because Erie is the shallowest, it is also the warmest of the Great Lakes, and in 1999 this almost became a problem for two nuclear power plants which require cool lake water to keep their reactors cool. The warm summer of 1999 caused lake temperatures to come close to the 85 °F (29 °C) limit necessary to keep the plants cool. Also because of its shallowness, it is the first to freeze in the winter.

The shallowest section of Lake Erie is the western basin where depths average only 25 to 30 feet (7.6 to 9.1 m); as a result, "the slightest breeze can kick up lively waves", also known as seiches. The "waves build very quickly", according to other accounts. The region around the lake is known as the "thunderstorm capital of Canada" with "breathtaking" lightning displays. Sometimes fierce waves springing up unexpectedly have led to dramatic rescues; in one instance, a Cleveland resident was trapped by churning surf with six foot waves near his dock, but was rescued by a fire department diver from Avon Lake, Ohio:

In a tug of war against the waves, the two were finally hauled out by rope. After being trapped for an hour-and-a-half, Baker was back on dry land, exhausted and battered but alive.

— Tatiana Morales, CBS News, 2004

Lake Erie is primarily fed by the Detroit River (from Lake Huron and Lake St. Clair) and drains via the Niagara River and Niagara Falls into Lake Ontario. Navigation downstream is provided by the Welland Canal, part of the Saint Lawrence Seaway. Other major contributors to Lake Erie include Grand River, Huron River, Maumee River, Sandusky River, Cuyahoga River, and Buffalo River. The drainage basin covers 30,140 square miles (78,100 km^{2}).

Point Pelee National Park, the southernmost point of the Canadian mainland, is located on a peninsula extending into the lake. Lake Erie has 31 islands (13 in Canada, 18 in the U.S.), located generally in the western side of the lake. The largest of these is Pelee Island.

=== Water levels ===
Lake Erie has a lake retention time of 2.6 years, the shortest of all the Great Lakes. Lake Erie's water level fluctuates with the seasons as in the other Great Lakes. Generally, the lowest levels are in January and February and the highest in June or July, although there have been exceptions. The average yearly level varies depending on long-term precipitation. Short-term level changes are often caused by seiches that are particularly high when southwesterly winds blow across the length of the lake during storms. These cause water to pile up at the eastern end of the lake. Storm-driven seiches can cause damage onshore. During one storm in November 2003, the water level at Buffalo rose by 7 feet (2.1 m) with waves of 10–15 feet (3.0–4.6 metres) for a rise of 22 feet (6.7 m). Meanwhile, at the western end of the lake, Toledo experienced a similar drop in water level.

- Historic High Water. In the summer of 1986, Lake Erie reached its highest level at 5.08 feet (1.55 m) above the datum. The high water records were set from April 1986 through January 1987. Levels ranged from 4.33 to 5.08 feet (1.32–1.55 m) above the datum.
- Historic Low Water. In the winter of 1934, Lake Erie reached its lowest level at 1.5 feet (0.46 m) below the datum. Monthly low water records were set from July 1934 through June 1935. During these twelve months water levels ranged from 1.5 feet (0.46 m) below the datum to even with the datum.

== Geology ==
Lake Erie was carved out by glacier ice and went through many phases before its current form which is less than 4,000 years old, which is a short span in geological terms. Before this, the land on which the lake now sits went through several complex stages. A large lowland basin formed over two million years ago as a result of an eastern flowing river that existed well before the Pleistocene ice ages. This ancient drainage system was destroyed by the first major glacier in the area, while it deepened and enlarged the lowland areas, allowing water to settle and form a lake. The glaciers were able to carve away more land on the eastern side of the lowland because the bedrock is made of shale which is softer than the carbonate rocks of dolomite and limestone on the western side. The lake basin is divided into distinct eastern, central basin, and western basin sub-basins, with especially shallow conditions in the western basin, which averages only 25 feet (7.6 m) deep and is rich in nutrients and fish. Geological analyses indicate that differential glacial erosion, and the influence of structural features such as the Niagara Escarpment, limited the extent of overdeepening when compared with Lake Superior and Lake Ontario.

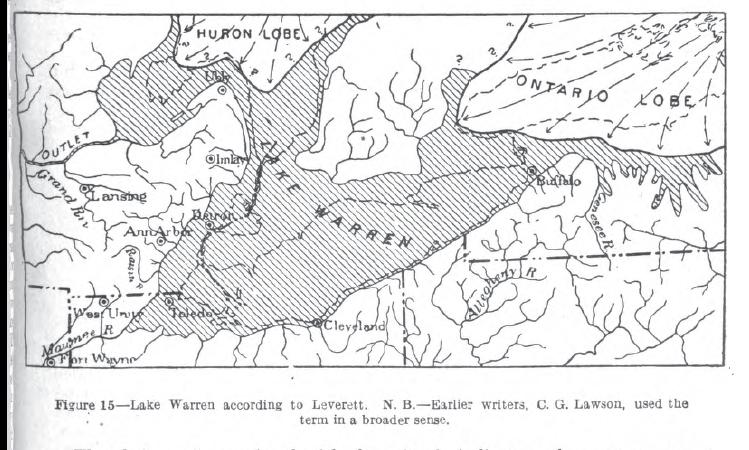
Map of Lake Warren in the Lake Huron and Lake Erie Basins

As many as three glaciers advanced and retreated over the land, causing temporary lakes to form in the time periods in between each of them (see: Lake Whittlesey, Lake Maumee and Lake Arkona). Because each lake had a different volume of water, their shorelines rested at differing elevations. The last lake to form, Lake Warren, existed between about 13,000 and 12,000 years ago. It was deeper than the current Lake Erie, and its shoreline existed about eight miles (13 km) inland from the modern one. Early Lake Erie went through many phases with its ancient sand dunes visible in the Oak Openings Region in Northwest Ohio. There, the sandy dry lake bed soil was not sufficient to support large trees with the exception of a few species of oaks, forming a rare oak savanna.

== History ==
=== Indigenous peoples ===
At the time of European contact, there were several Indigenous peoples living around the shores of the eastern end of the lake. The Erie tribe (from whom the lake takes its name) lived along the southern edge, while the Neutrals (also known as Attawandaron) lived along the northern shore. The tribal name "erie" is a shortened form of the Iroquoian word erielhonan, meaning "long tail". The name may also come from the word eri, meaning "cherry tree". Near Port Stanley, there is an Indigenous village dating from the 16th century known as the Southwold Earthworks where as many as 800 Neutral Indigenous peoples once lived; the archaeological remains include double earth walls winding around the grass-covered perimeter. Europeans named the tribe the Neutral Indians since these people refused to fight with other tribes.

Both the Erie and Neutrals were colonized and assimilated by their hostile eastern neighbors, the Iroquois Confederacy, between 1651 and 1657 during the Beaver Wars. For decades after those wars, the land around eastern Lake Erie was claimed and utilized by the Iroquois as a hunting ground. As the power of the Iroquois waned during the last quarter of the 17th century, several other, mainly Anishinaabe, displaced them from the territories they claimed on the north shore of the lake. There was a legend of an Indigenous woman named Huldah, who, despairing over her lost British lover, hurled herself from a high rock from Pelee Island.

=== European exploration and settlement ===
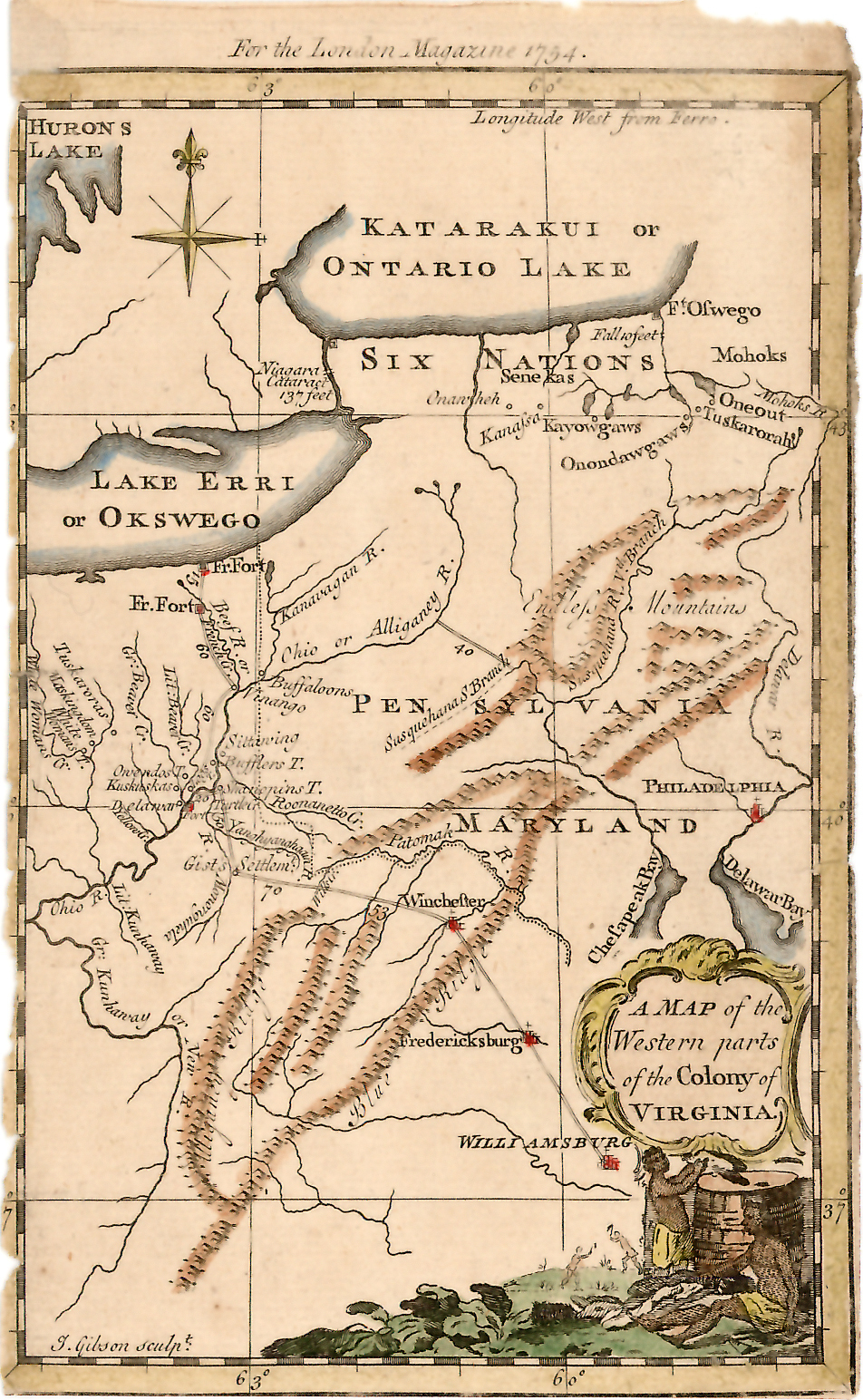
Map showing Lake Erie, 1754

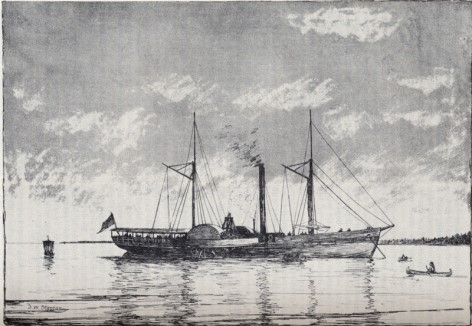
Walk in Water, built in Buffalo, was the first steamship on Lake Erie. Picture c. 1816.

In 1669, Frenchman Louis Jolliet was the first documented European to sight Lake Erie, although there is speculation that Étienne Brûlé may have come across it in 1615. Lake Erie was the last of the Great Lakes to be explored by Europeans, since the Iroquois who occupied the Niagara River area were in conflict with the French, and they did not allow explorers or traders to pass through; explorers followed rivers out of Lake Ontario and portaged to Lake Huron. British authorities in Canada were nervous about possible expansion by American settlers across Lake Erie, so Colonel Thomas Talbot developed the Talbot Trail in 1809 as a way to stimulate settlement to the area; Talbot recruited settlers from Ireland and Scotland, and there are numerous places named after him in southern Ontario, such as Port Talbot, the Talbot River, and Talbotville.

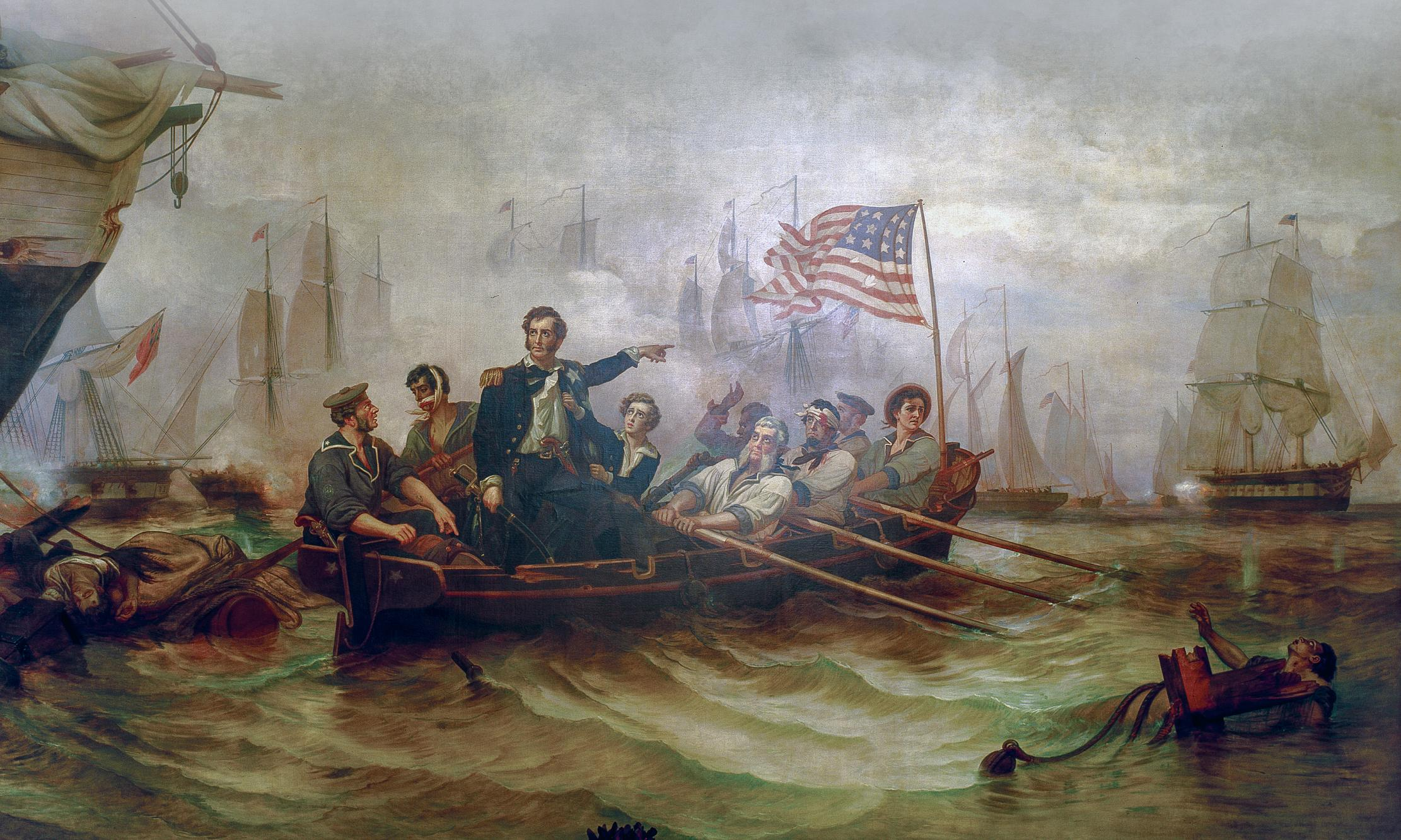
Battle of Lake Erie (1865) by William H. Powell depicts US Navy commander Oliver Hazard Perry

During the War of 1812, a United States Navy squadron under Oliver Hazard Perry captured a smaller Royal Navy squadron near Put-in-Bay, Ohio at the 1813 Battle of Lake Erie. As part of the conflict, American troops made repeated raids throughout the Ontario area around Port Rowan, burning towns and villages. Generally, however, with the exceptions of the American Revolutionary War and the War of 1812—which were conflicts between the U.S. and Britain—relations between the U.S. and Canada have been remarkably friendly with an "unfortified boundary" and an agreement "that has kept all fleets of war off the Great Lakes."

In 1837, the Lower Canada Rebellion broke out. These primarily concerned political reforms and land allocation issues. Some of the rebels stationed themselves in the U.S. and crossed the ice from Sandusky Bay to Pelee Island wearing "tattered overcoats and worn-out boots", and carrying muskets, pitchforks, and swords, but the islanders had already fled. Later, there was a battle on the ice with the Royal 32nd Regiment, with the rebels being driven to retreat.

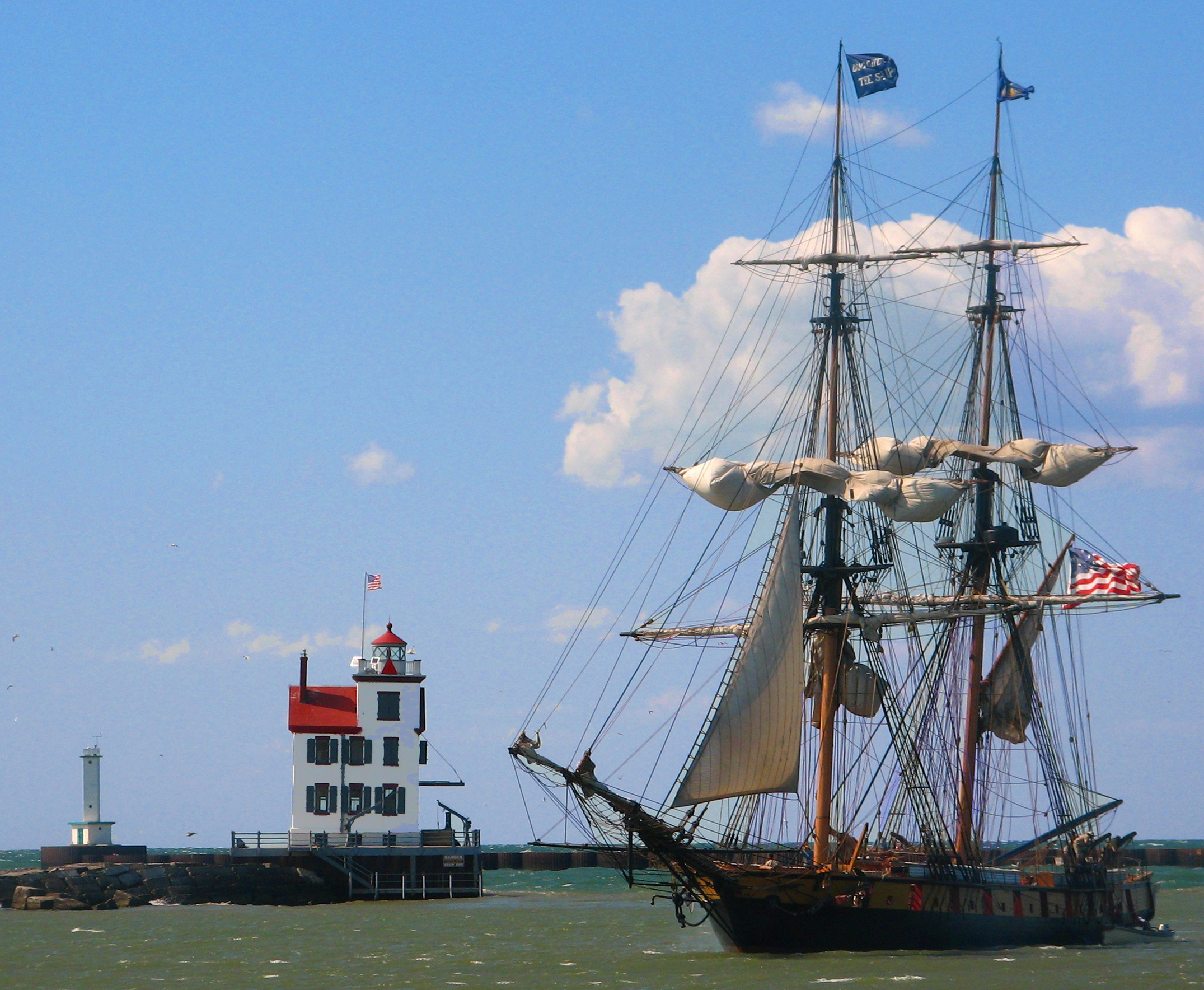
At an Ohio history festival, the 19th-century style brig warship Niagara passes the Lorain lighthouse.

Settlers established commercial fisheries on the north coast of the lake around the 1850s. An important business was fishing. In the pre-Civil War years, railways sprouted everywhere, and around 1852 there were railways circling the lake. Maritime traffic picked up, although the lake was usually closed because of ice from December to early April, and ships had to wait for the ice to clear before proceeding. Since slavery had been abolished in Canada in 1833 but was still legal in southern U.S., a Lake Erie crossing was sometimes required for fugitive slaves seeking freedom:

When Kentucky fugitive Lewis Clarke arrived in Cleveland, he had no idea how to find Canada. "I went out to the shore of the lake again and again, to try and see the other side, but I could see no hill, mountain, nor city of the asylum I sought," he once told an interviewer. "I was afraid to inquire where (Canada) was, lest it would betray such a degree of ignorance as to excite suspicion at once." Many fugitives also had to overcome fears instilled by their former masters ...

— Chris Lackner in the Ottawa Citizen, 2006

Prior to modern radar and weather forecasting, merchant ships were often caught up in intense gales:

A violent gale is blowing on Lake Erie ... The schooner Stranger came in this morning and reports seeing a vessel about 12 miles [19 km] up, 2 miles [3.2 km] from the Canada shore, with three men clinging to the masts, which alone were visible above the water–heard their cries and screams ...

— The New York Times, October 1853

There were reports of disasters usually from sea captains passing information to reporters; in 1868, the captain of the Grace Whitney saw a sunken vessel with "three men clinging to the masthead," but he could not help because of the gale and high seas.

A balloonist named John Steiner of Philadelphia made an ambitious trip across the lake in 1857. His voyage was described in The New York Times:

He arose to the height of about three miles, and started off at a slow but steady rate ... The lake could be seen from one end to the other nearly ... At one time Mr. Steiner counted 38 sail vessels, all in sight, and far below him. The hands on board several of the vessels saw him, and rightly apprehending that he was an aeronaut, cheered him heartily ... He neared the Canada shore a little below Long Point ... he was accordingly driven towards Buffalo ... Night was drawing on and it became apparent that he could not, with this current, get away from the water before dark, and after nightfall it would not be safe to come down. Seeing a propeller (powered boat) ... the Mary Stewart ... He first struck the water about 25 miles below Long Point ... During this time Mr. Steiner says he thinks his balloon bounded from the water at least twenty times. It would strike and then rebound, like a ball, going into the air from twenty to fifty feet, and still rushing down the lake at railroad speed ... Mr. Steiner then abandoned the balloon, leaping into the water and swimming towards the boat, which speedily reached him ...

— The New York Times, July 23, 1857

In 1885, lake winds were so strong that water levels dropped substantially, sometimes by as much as two feet, so that at ports such as Toledo, watercraft could not load coal or depart the port. During the history of the lake as a fishery, there has been marked battling by opposing interest groups:

The preservation of the fisheries of Lake Erie has become a serious problem to all who have given it close attention ... the fisheries are being exhausted by the wasteful methods which are now in vogue ... it is still the custom of the pound fishermen about Sandusky to take fish of all sizes, and if they are too small to be marketable they are turned over to a fertilizer factory. If left undisturbed for two or three years more, these little fish would be a very valuable product ...

— The New York Times, 1895

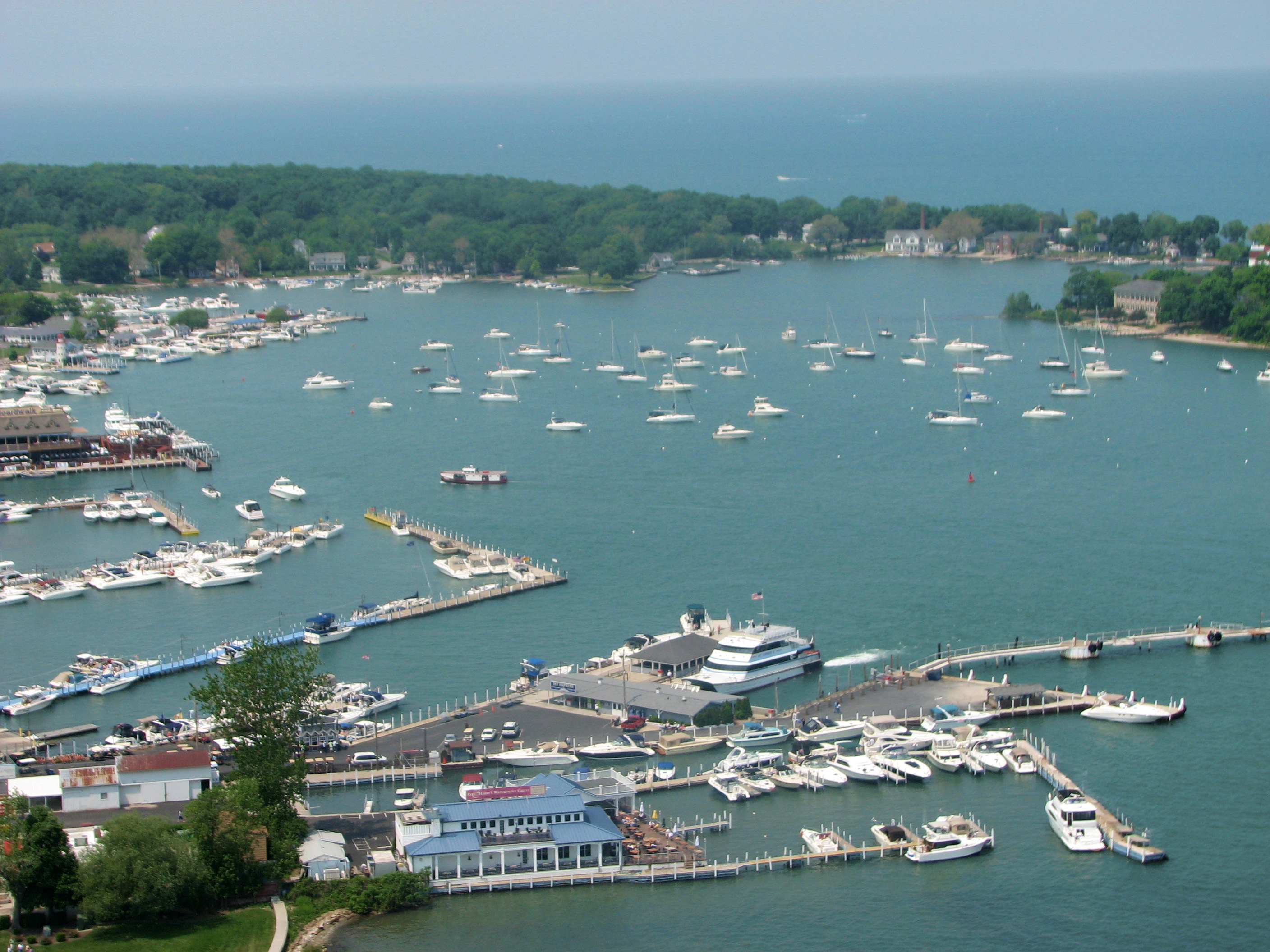
View from Perry's Victory and International Peace Memorial at Put-in-Bay, Ohio

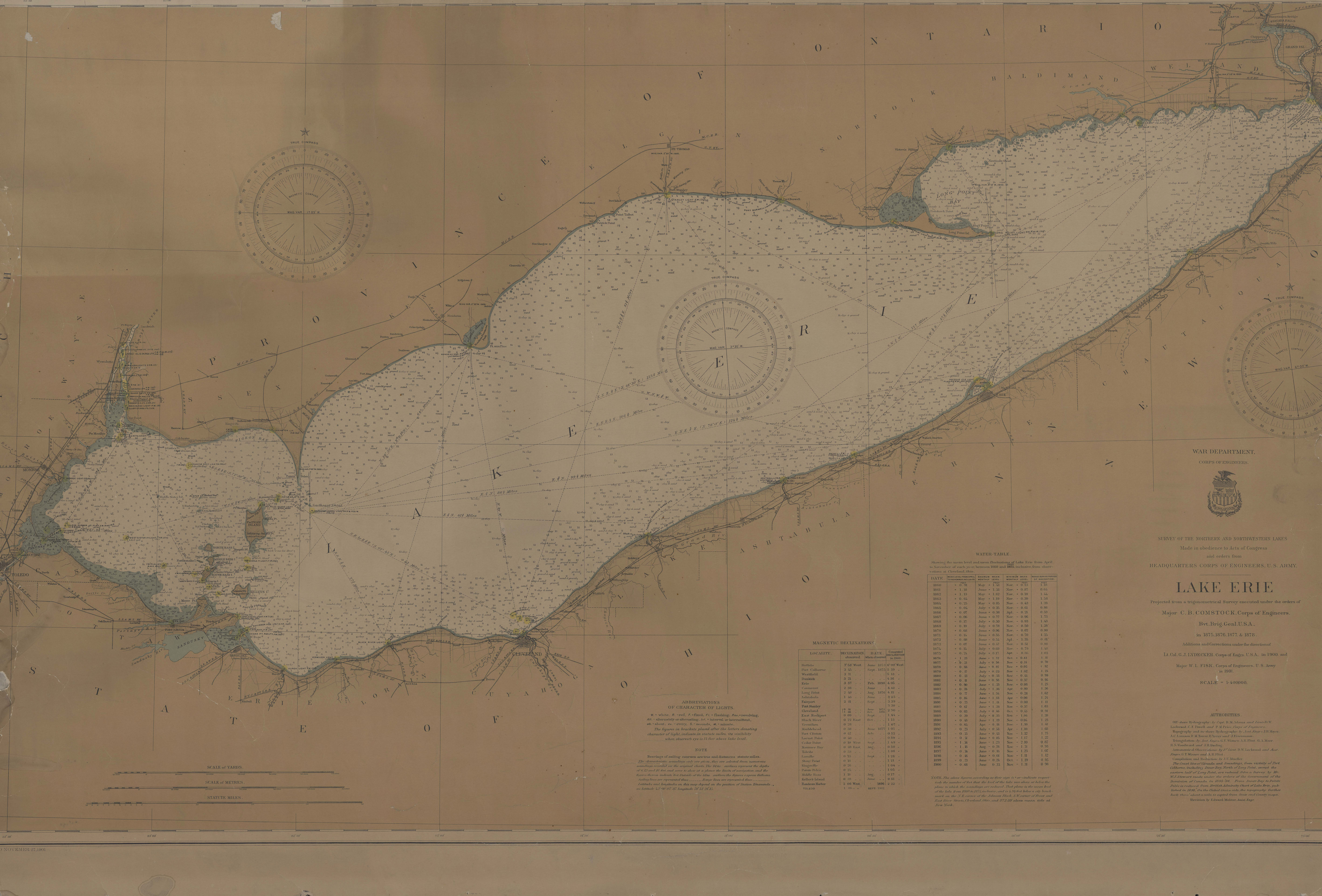
Lake Erie historical map, 1901

Predictions of the lake being over-fished in 1895 were premature, since the fishery has survived commercial and sport fishing, pollution in the middle of the 20th century, invasive species and other ailments, but state and provincial governments, as well as national governments, have played a greater role as time went by. Business boomed; in 1901, the Carnegie Company proposed building a new harbor near Erie, Pennsylvania, in Elk Creek to accommodate shipments from its tube-plant site nearby. In 1913, a memorial to Commodore Oliver Hazard Perry was built on Put-in-Bay island featuring a Doric column.

Steamships have operated on Lake Erie since the early 1800s. Large, opulent cruise liners carried passengers between Detroit, Cleveland, Buffalo and other cities on the lake until the rise of the automobile in the 1950s drastically cut demand for their services. The Detroit and Cleveland Navigation Company was one of the largest and most renowned of these companies.

During the Prohibition years from 1919 to 1933, a "great deal of alcohol crossed Erie" along with "mobster corpses" dumped into the Detroit River which sometimes washed up on the beaches of Pelee Island. Notable rum runners included Thomas Joseph McGinty and the Purple Gang. The Coast Guard attempted to interdict the Canadian liquor with its Rum Patrol, and a casino operated on Middle Island.

During the 20th century, commercial fishing was prevalent but so was the boom in manufacturing industry around the lake, and often rivers and streams were used as sewers to flush untreated sewage which ended up in the lake. Sometimes poorly constructed sanitary systems meant that when old pipes broke, raw sewage would spill directly into the Cuyahoga River and into the lake. A report in Time magazine in 1969 described the lake as a "gigantic cesspool" since only three of 62 beaches were rated "completely safe for swimming".

By 1975 the popular commercial fish blue pike had been declared extinct, although the declaration may have been premature. By the 1980s, there were about 130 fishing vessels with about 3,000 workers, but commercial fishing was declining rapidly, particularly from the American side.

=== Great Lakes Compact ===
In 2005, the Great Lakes states of Ohio, Michigan, New York, Pennsylvania, Illinois, Indiana, Wisconsin, and Minnesota and the Canadian Provinces of Ontario and Quebec endorsed the Great Lakes-St. Lawrence River Basin Sustainable Water Resources Compact. It was signed into law by President George W. Bush in September 2008. An international water-rights policy overseen by the Great Lakes Commission, the compact aims to prevent diversion of water from Great Lakes to distant states, as well as to set standards for use and conservation. It had support from both political parties, including United States Senator George Voinovich of Ohio and Governor Jennifer Granholm of Michigan, but is not popular in the southwestern states because of frequent drought conditions and water scarcity.

== Lake environment ==
=== Climate ===
==== Lake Erie in winter ====
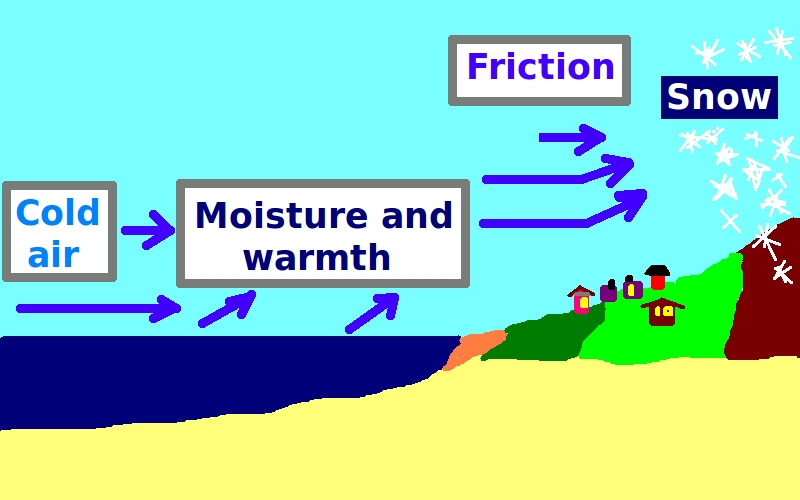
Cold air travels over warm lake water. The air becomes warmer, moister, less dense, so that it rises; when it passes over land, the reduced airspace causes the air to "pile up" resulting in "frictional convergence." This lifts the air even further to where it cools, turning into droplets or snowflakes. The result is enhanced snowfall.

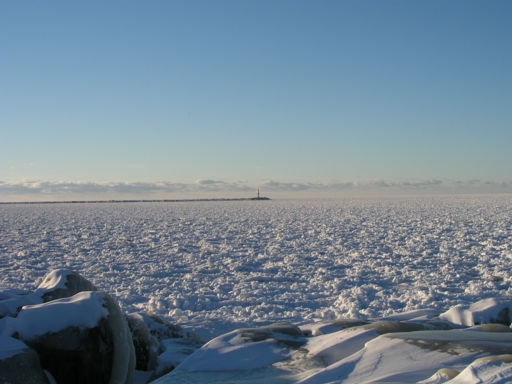
Lake Erie in winter

Like the other Great Lakes, Erie produces lake-effect snow when the first cold winds of winter pass over the warm waters. When the temperatures of the relatively warm surface water and the colder air separate to at least 18 °F (10 °C) to 23 °F (13 °C) apart, then "lake-effect snow becomes possible:"

As cold air flows over the warm water, the lake warms and moistens the air. Since warm, moist air is less dense than cold air, the heated air rises. Rising air cools and water vapor condenses into cloud droplets ... the efficiency of snow production increases when the wind pushes the clouds over land. Friction with the ground causes air to pile up. This frictional convergence creates lift and enhances snowfall.

— Bob Swanson and Adrienne Lewis of USA Today, 2008

Heavy lake-effect snowfalls can occur when cold air travels 60 miles (97 km) or longer over a large unfrozen lake. Lake-effect snow makes Buffalo and Erie the eleventh and thirteenth-snowiest cities in the contiguous United States, respectively, according to data collected from the National Climatic Data Center. Since winds blow primarily west to east along the main axis of the lake, lake-effect snowstorms are more pronounced on the eastern parts of the lake. Buffalo typically gets 95 inches (240 cm) of snow each winter and sometimes ten feet (3.0 m) of snow; the snowiest city is Syracuse, New York, which can receive heavy snowfall from both the lake effect process and large coastal cyclones. A storm around Christmas in 2001 pounded Buffalo with 7 feet (2.1 m) of snow.

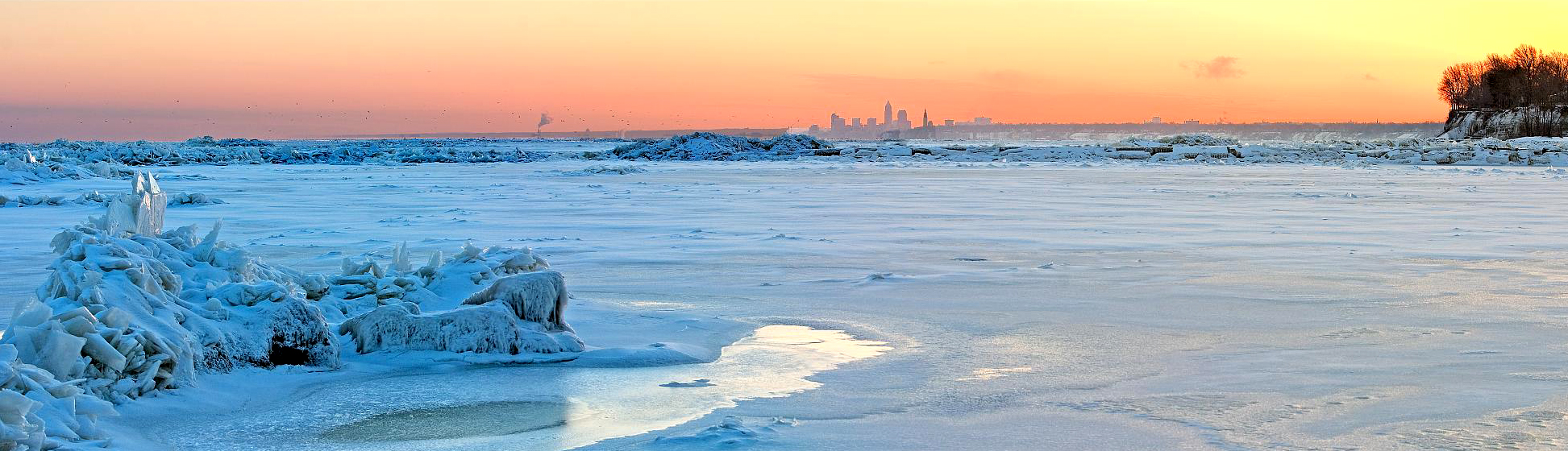
Lake Erie in winter

The effects of the warmer lake water is reduced when the lake freezes over. In January 2011, for example, residents of Cleveland were glad when Lake Erie was "90 percent frozen" since it meant that the area had "made it over the hump" in terms of enduring repeated snowfalls which required much shoveling. Being the shallowest of the Great Lakes, it is the most likely to freeze and frequently does. In contrast, Lake Michigan has never completely frozen over since the warmer and deeper portion is in the south, although it came close to being totally frozen during three harsh winters over the past century. In past years, lake ice was so thick that it was possible to drive over it or go sailing on iceboats. Many lake residents take advantage of the ice and travel; some drive to Canada and back:

The first ice usually forms in late November, and by January, it locks into place. For islanders in the Western Basin, it is the equivalent of summer vacation ... Once the lake freezes, islanders organize impromptu ice rallies. Families gather to drink hot wine and race all-terrain vehicles across the lake. They also race iceboats, which resemble sailboats on skates ... Many people drive to other islands for dinner with friends. They ride in cars with the roofs and doors chopped off so they can escape if the vehicles fall through the ice. Islanders stab evergreen trees into the ice every 50 yards [46 m] to mark a route ... Even in the coldest winters, there are dangerous patches of thin ice. The cracks are so predictable that the Put-in-Bay Ice Yacht Club prints them on a map ... On a normal winter day, the ice is dotted with 2,000 fishing shanties.

— Christopher Maag in The New York Times, 2004

==== Windy conditions ====
Strong winds have caused lake currents to shift sediment on the bottom, leading to shifting sandbars that have been the cause of shipwrecks. But winds can have a peaceful purpose as well; there have been proposals to place electricity–producing wind turbines in windy and shallow points in the lake and along the coast. Steel Winds, a former steel mill site in Buffalo, has been developed as an urban wind farm housing 14 turbines capable of generating up to 35 megawatts of electricity. A plan by Samsung to build an offshore wind farm on the north shore of the lake, from Port Maitland to Nanticoke for a distance of 15.5 mi (24.9 km), has been met with opposition from residents. Canadians near Leamington and Kingsville have organized protest groups to thwart attempts to bring wind turbines to the lake; reasons against the turbines include spoiling lake views. Plans to install turbines in Pigeon Bay, south of Leamington were met with opposition as well. The notion that bird and bat migration may be hurt by the wind turbines has been used to argue against the wind turbines as well.

==== Microclimates ====
The lake is responsible for microclimates that are important to agriculture. Along its north shore is one of the richest areas of Canada's fruit and vegetable production; this southernmost tip, particularly in the area around Leamington, is known as Canada's "tomato capital". The area around Port Rowan has special trees that grow because of the "tempering effect of the lake", and species include tulip trees, dogwood, sassafras, and sour gum. This area's many greenhouses produce a "variety of tropical plants rarely cultivated so far north", including some species of cacti, because of the lake's tempering effect. Along the southeastern shore of Ohio, Pennsylvania, and New York is an important grape-growing region, as are the islands in the lake. Apple orchards are abundant in northeast Ohio to western New York.

==== Long-term weather patterns ====
According to one estimate, 34 to 36 inches (860 to 910 mm) of water evaporate each year from the surface of the lake, which allows for rainfall and other precipitation in surrounding areas. Reports are conflicting about the overall effect of global warming on the Great Lakes region, including Lake Erie. One account suggests that climate change is causing greater evaporation of lake water, leading to warmer temperatures, as well as thinner or nonexistent ice in winter, which is fueling concerns that "Erie appears to be shrinking" and is the most likely candidate among the five Great Lakes to "turn into a festering mud puddle." In 2010, the Windsor Star reported that the lake experienced record-breaking water temperatures, reaching 81 °F (27 °C) in mid-August and compared the lake to a "bath tub".

=== Ecosystems ===
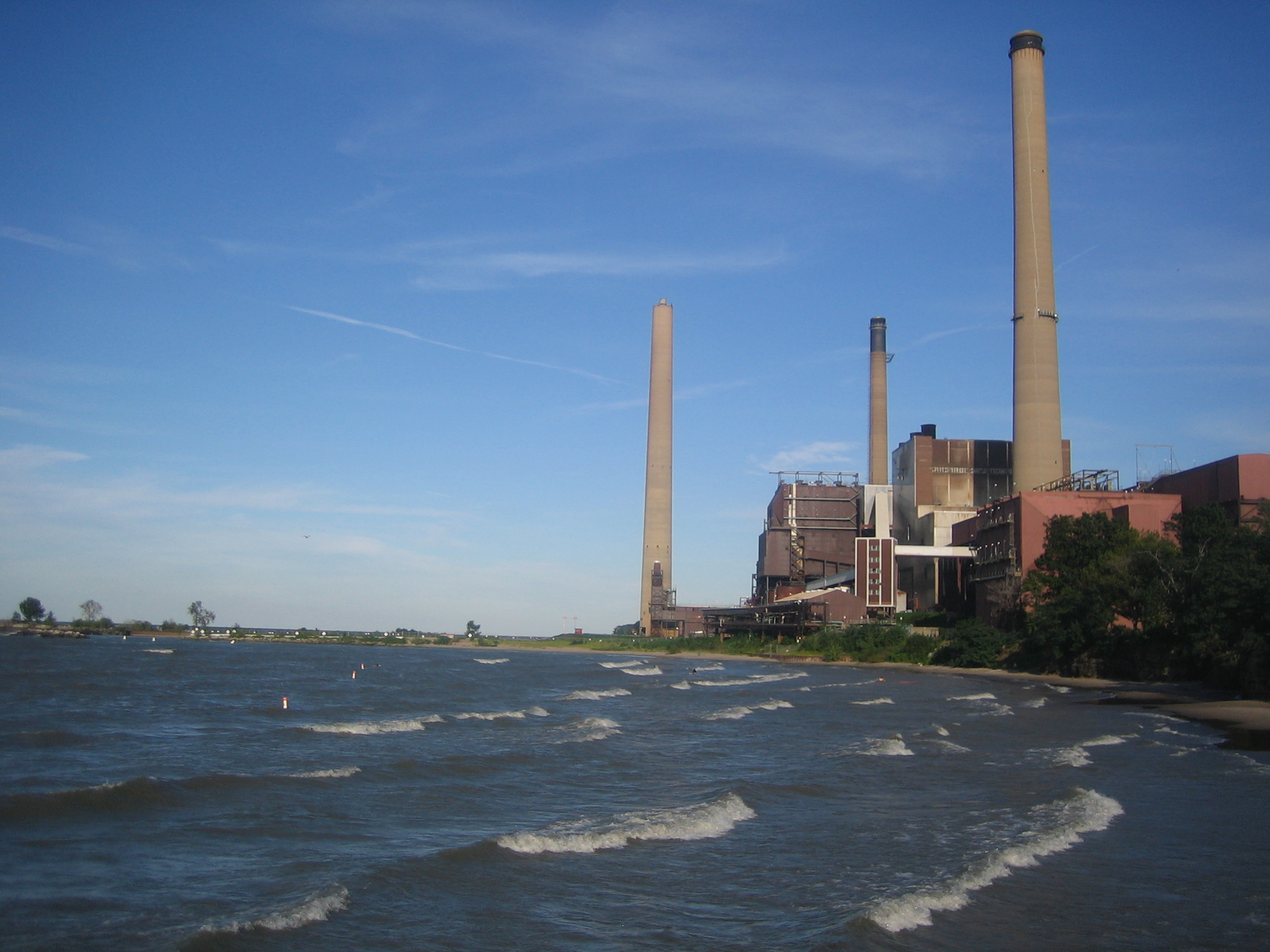
A since-demolished coal-fired power plant in Avon Lake, Ohio, located on Lake Erie

Lake Erie has a complex ecosystem with many species in interaction. Human activity, such as pollution and maritime ship traffic, can affect this environment in numerous ways. The interactions between invasive species can sometimes have beneficial effects, though harmful effects are more likely. Some introductions have been seen as beneficial such as the introduction of Pacific salmon. Occasionally there have been mass die-offs of certain species of fish, sometimes for reasons unknown, such as many numbers of rainbow smelt in May 2010.

==== Invasive species ====
The lake has been plagued with a number of invasive species, including zebra and quagga mussels, the goby, and the grass carp. One estimate was that 180 invasive species are in the Great Lakes, some having traveled in ballast water in international ships. Zebra mussels and gobies have been credited with the increased population and size of smallmouth bass in Lake Erie. In 2008, concerns arose that the "newest invader swarming in the Great Lakes", the bloody-red shrimp, might harm fish populations and promote algal blooms.

Environmentalists and biologists study lake conditions via installations such as the Franz Theodore Stone Laboratory on Gibraltar Island. The lab, which was established in 1895, is the oldest biological field station in the United States. Stone Laboratory was donated to the Ohio State University by Julius Stone in 1925 as part of the university's Ohio Sea Grant College program. The Great Lakes Institute of the University of Windsor has experts who study issues such as lake sediment pollution and the flow of contaminants such as phosphorus.

Other invasive species in Lake Erie include spiny water fleas, fishhook water fleas, sea lamprey, and white perch. The invasive plant species in Lake Erie consist mainly of Eurasian milfoil, Trapa natans and purple loosestrife. The shore of the lake is also host to invasive species of the Phragmites reed genus.

==== Eutrophication and cyanobacterial blooms ====
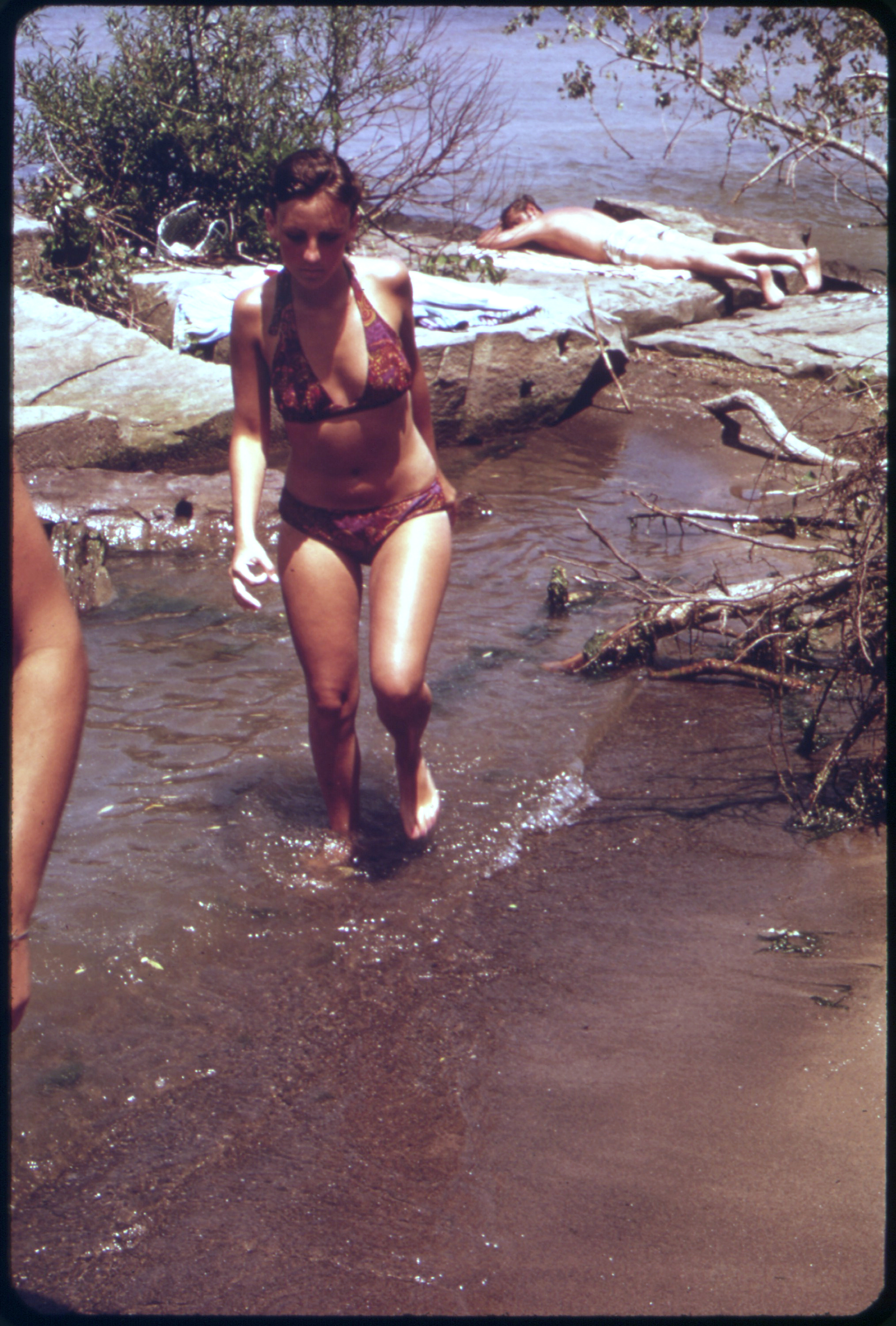
A 1973 photo from the U.S. Environmental Protection Agency showing beach erosion, algae, and uprooted trees as a result of environmental issues

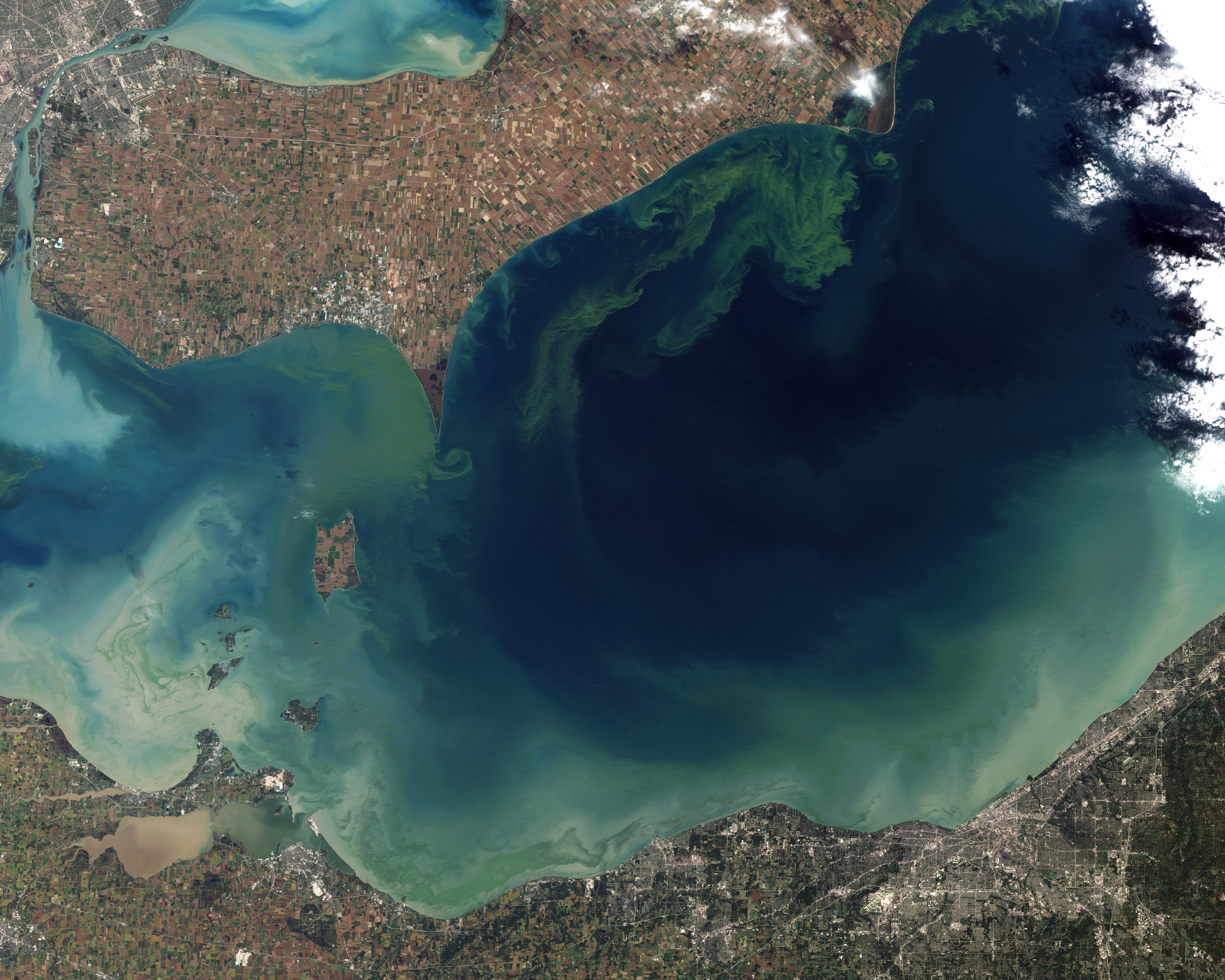
The green scum shown in this image taken in October 2011 is the worst algal bloom Lake Erie has experienced in decades.

An ongoing concern is that nutrient overloading from fertilizers and human and animal waste, known as eutrophication, in which additional nitrogen and phosphorus enter the lake, will cause plant life to "run wild and multiply like crazy". Since fewer wetlands remain to filter nutrients, and greater channelization of waterways, nutrients in water can cause algal blooms to sprout, with "low-oxygen dead zones" in a complex interaction of natural forces. As of the 2010s, much of the phosphorus in the lake comes from fertilizer applied to no-till soybean and corn fields, but washed into streams by heavy rains. The algal blooms result from growth of Microcystis, a toxic blue-green alga that the zebra mussels, which infest the lake, do not eat.

Periodically, a dead zone, or region of low oxygen, occurs in the lake, the location of which varies. Scientists from the National Oceanic and Atmospheric Administration have been studying the lake's blue-green algal blooms and trying to find ways to predict when they are spreading or where they might make landfall; typically, the blooms arrive late each summer. This problem was extreme in the mid- and late 1960s, and the Lake Erie Wastewater Management Study conducted by the Buffalo District of the U.S. Army Corps of Engineers determined that the eutrophication was caused by point sources such as industrial outfalls and municipal sanitary and storm sewer outfalls, as well as diffuse sources, such as overland runoff from farm and forest land. All of these sources contribute nutrients, primarily phosphorus, to the lake. Growth of organisms in the lake is then spiked to the point that oxygen levels are depleted. Recommendations were made for reducing point-source outflows, and reducing farm contributions of phosphorus by changing fertilizer usage, employing no-till farming, and other conservative practices. Many industrial and municipal sources have since been greatly reduced. The improved farming practices, which were voluntary, were followed for a while, resulting in remarkable recovery of the lake in the 1970s.

The conservation practices are not monitored and have not been kept up. One recent account suggests that the seasonal algal blooms in Lake Erie were possibly caused by runoff from cities, fertilizers, zebra mussels, and livestock near water. A second report focuses on the zebra mussels as being the cause of dead zones, since they filter so much sediment that this produces an overgrowth of algae. One report suggests the oxygen-poor zone began about 1993 in the lake's central basin and becomes more pronounced during summer, but is somewhat of a mystery why this happens. Some scientists speculate that the dead zone is a naturally occurring phenomenon. Another report cites Ohio's Maumee River as the main source of polluted runoff of phosphorus from industries, municipalities, tributaries and agriculture, and in 2008, satellite images showed the algal bloom heading toward Pelee Island. Two two-year, $2 million studies are trying to understand the "growing zone", which was described as a 10-foot-thick layer of cold water at the bottom, 55 feet (17 m) in one area, which stretches 100 miles [160 km] across the lake's center. It kills fish and microscopic creatures of the lake's food chain and fouls the water, and may cause further problems in later years for sport and commercial fishing.

Algal blooms continued in early 2013, but new farming techniques, climate change, and even a change in Lake Erie's ecosystem make phosphorus pollution more intractable. Blue-green algae (Cyanobacteria) bloom, were problematic in August 2019. According to a news report in August, "scientists fully expect [it] to overwhelm much of western Lake Erie again this summer". By August 12, 2019, the bloom extended for roughly 50 kilometres (31 mi). A large bloom does not necessarily mean the cyanobacteria ... will produce toxins", said Michael McKay, executive director of the Great Lakes Institute for Environmental Research at the University of Windsor. "Not enough is being done to stop fertilizer and phosphorus from getting into the lake and causing blooms," he added. Water testing was being conducted in August. The largest Lake Erie blooms to date occurred in 2015, exceeding the severity index at 10.5 and in 2011 at a 10, according to the NOAA. In early August, the 2019 bloom was expected to measure 7.5 on the severity index, but could range between 6 and 9. At that time, satellite images depicted a bloom stretching up to 1,300 square kilometres (500 sq mi) on Lake Erie, with the epicenter near Toledo, Ohio.

==== Snakes ====
The Lake Erie water snake, a subspecies of the northern water snake (Nerodia sipedon), lives in the vicinity of Ohio's Put-in-Bay Harbor and had been placed on the threatened species list. By 2010, the water snake population was over 12,000 snakes. While they have a nonvenomous bite, they are a key predator in the lake's aquatic ecosystem since they feed on mudpuppies, walleye, and smallmouth bass. The snake is helpful in keeping the population of goby fish in check. They mate from late May through early June and can be found in large mating balls with one female bunched within several males.

==== Insects and birds ====
In 1999, a local TV station's Doppler weather radar detected millions of mayflies heading for Presque Isle in blue and green splotches on the radar in clouds measuring 10 mi (16 km) long. These insects were a sign of Lake Erie's move back to health, since the mayflies require clean water to thrive. Biologist Masteller of Pennsylvania State University declared the insects to be a "nice nuisance" since they signified the lake's return to health after 40 years of absence. Each is 1.5 in (38 mm) long; the three main species of mayflies are Ephemera simulans, Hexagenia rigida, and H. limbata. The insects mate over a 72-hour period from June through September; they fly in masses up to the shore, mate in the air, then females lay up to 8,000 eggs each over the water; the eggs sink back down and the cycle repeats. Sometimes, the clouds of mayflies have caused power outages and caused roads to become slippery with squashed insects. Zebra mussels filtering extra nutrients from the lake allows the mayfly larvae to thrive.

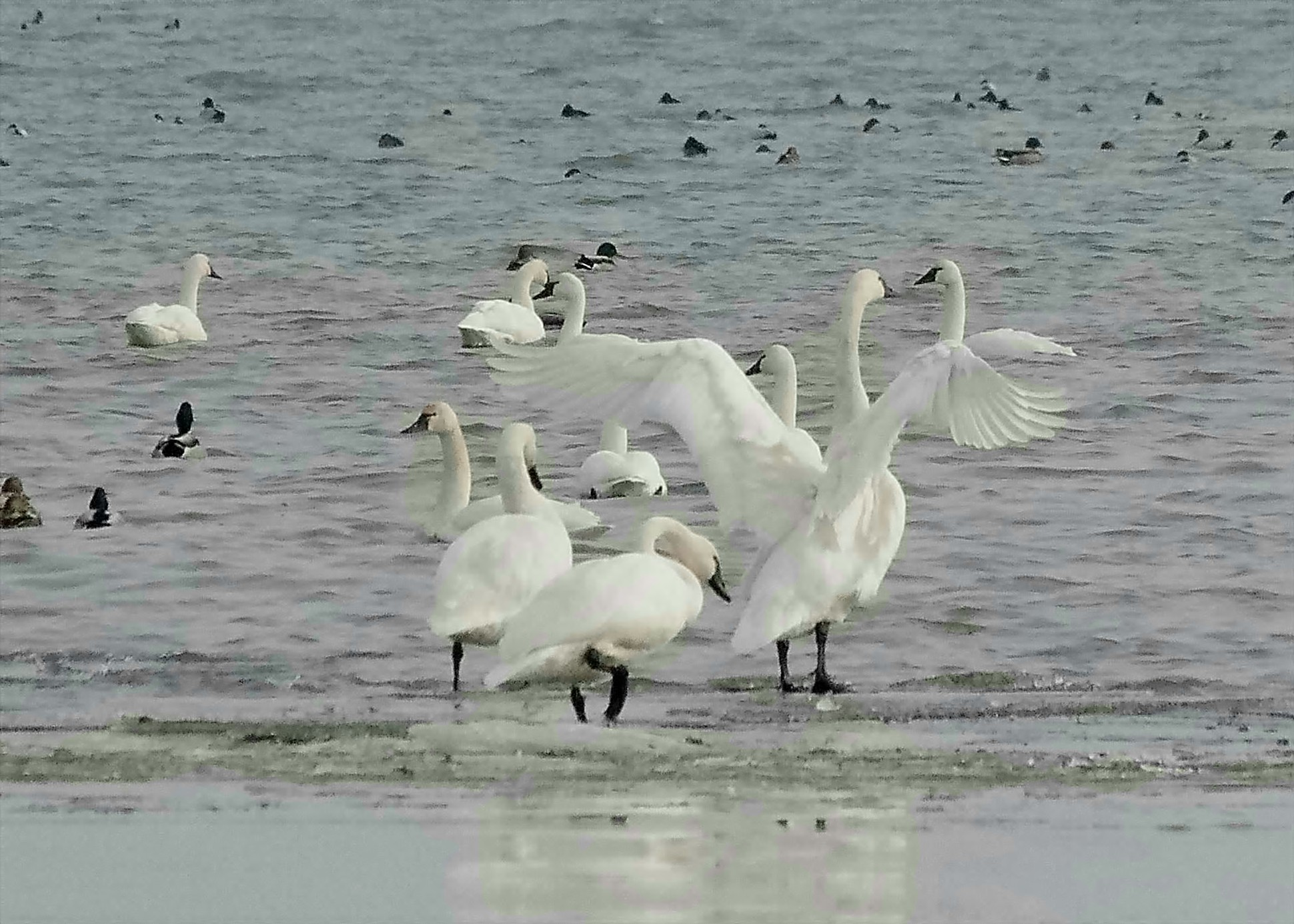
Trumpeter swans (Cygnus buccinator) on Lake Erie

Incidents of birds dying from botulism have occurred, in 2000 and in 2002. Birds affected included grebes, common and red-breasted mergansers, loons, diving ducks, ring-billed gulls, and herring gulls. One account suggests that bird populations are in trouble, notably the wood warbler, which had population declines around 60% in 2008. Possible causes for declines in bird populations are farming practices, loss of habitats, soil depletion and erosion, and toxic chemicals. In 2006, concerns arose of possible avian influenza (bird flu) after two wild swans on the lake were found diseased, but they did not contain the H5N1 virus. Sightings of a magnificent frigatebird, a tropical bird with a 2 m wingspan, happened over the lake in 2008.

==== Water quality issues and restoration ====
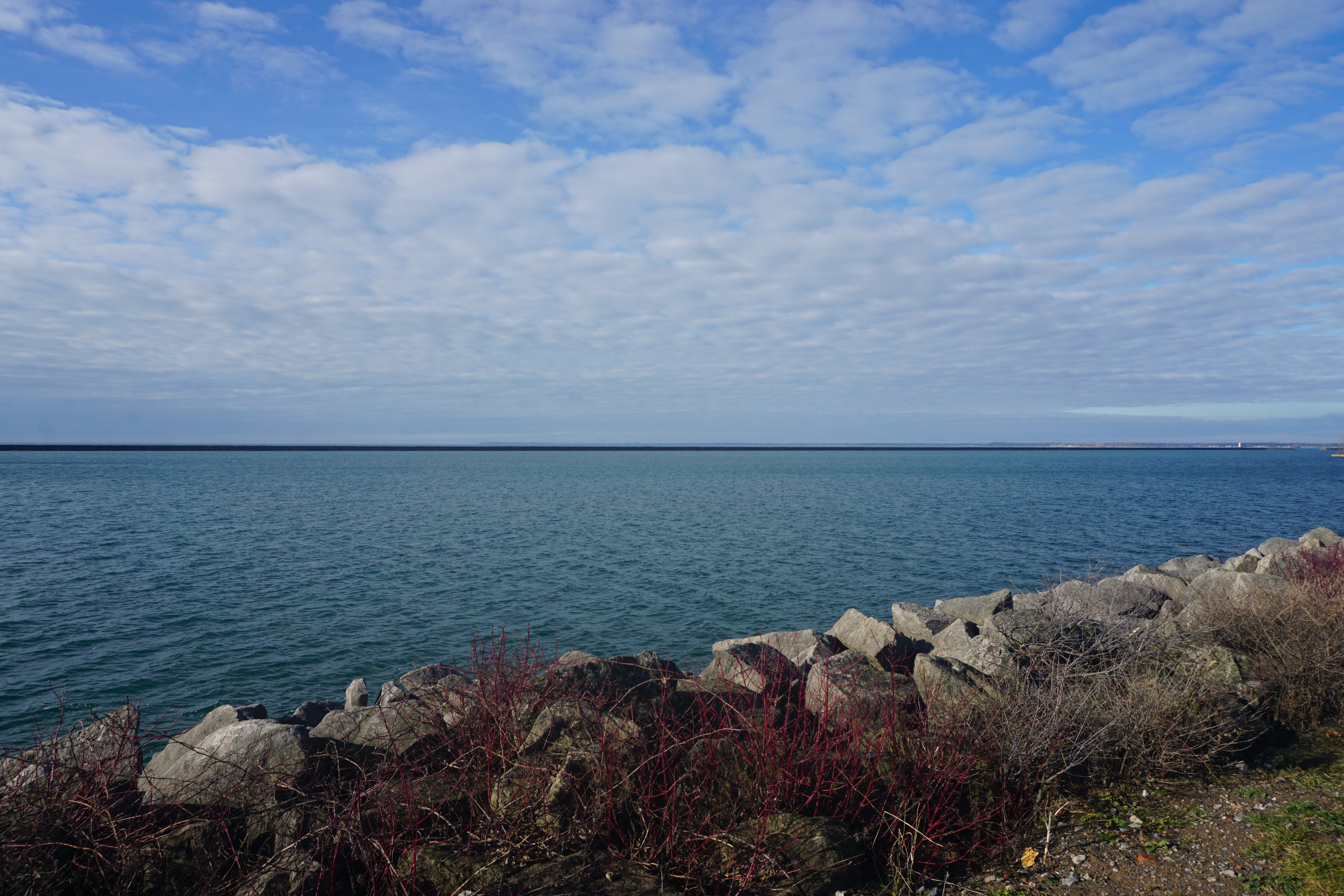
Lake Erie at Buffalo in 2024

Lake Erie became very polluted in the 1960s and 1970s as a result of the quantity of heavy industry situated in cities on its shores, with reports of bacteria-laden beaches and fish contaminated by industrial waste. In the 1970s, patches of the lake were declared dead because of industrial waste and sewage from runoffs; as The New York Times reporter Denny Lee wrote in 2004, "The lake, after all, is where the Rust Belt meets the water."

Incidents occurred of the oily surfaces of tributary rivers emptying into Lake Erie catching fire: in 1969, Cleveland's Cuyahoga River erupted in flames, chronicled in a Time magazine article which lamented a tendency to use rivers flowing through major cities as "convenient, free sewers"; the Detroit River caught fire on another occasion. The outlook was gloomy:

Each day, Detroit, Cleveland and 120 other municipalities fill Erie with 1.5 billion US gallons [5.7 million cubic metres] of "inadequately treated wastes, including nitrates and phosphates ... These chemicals act as fertilizer for growths of algae that suck oxygen from the lower depths and rise to the surface as odoriferous green scum ... Commercial and game fish—blue pike, whitefish, sturgeon, northern pike—have nearly vanished, yielding the waters to trash fish that need less oxygen. Weeds proliferate, turning water frontage into swamp. In short, Lake Erie is in danger of dying by suffocation.

— Time magazine, August 1969

In December 1970, a federal grand jury investigation led by U.S. Attorney Robert Jones began, of water pollution allegedly being caused by about 12 companies in northeastern Ohio. It was the first grand jury investigation of water pollution in the area. The grand jury indicted four corporations for polluting Lake Erie and waterways in northeast Ohio. Facing fines were Cleveland Electric Illuminating Co., Shell Oil Co., Uniroyal Chemical Division of Uniroyal Inc. and Olin Corp. United States Attorney General John N. Mitchell gave a press conference December 18, 1970, referencing new pollution control litigation, with particular reference to work with the Environmental Protection Agency, and announcing the filing of a lawsuit that morning against the Jones and Laughlin Steel Corporation for discharging substantial quantities of cyanide into the Cuyahoga River near Cleveland. Jones filed the misdemeanor charges in district court, alleging violations of the 1899 Rivers and Harbors Act.

Cleveland's director of public utilities Ben Stefanski pursued a massive effort to "scrub the Cuyahoga"; the effort cost $100 million in bonds, according to one estimate. New sewer lines were built. Clevelanders approved a bond issue by 2 to 1 to upgrade Cleveland's sewage system. Federal officials acted as well: the United States Congress passed the Clean Water Act of 1972, and the United States and Canada established water pollution limits in an international water quality agreement. The Corps' LEWMS was also instituted at that time.

The clearing of the water column is partly the result of the introduction and rapid spread of zebra mussels from Europe, which had the effect of covering the lake bottom, with each creature filtering a liter of fresh water each day, helping to restore the lake to a cleaner state. The 1972 Great Lakes Water Quality Agreement significantly reduced the dumping and runoff of phosphorus into the lake. The lake has since become clean enough to allow sunlight to infiltrate its water and produce algae and seaweed, but a dead zone persists. There have been instances of beach closings at Presque Isle because of unexplained E. Coli contaminations, possibly caused by sewer water overflows after heavy downpours.

Since the 1970s environmental regulation has led to a great increase in water quality and the return of economically important fish species such as walleye and other biological life. There was substantial evidence that the new controls had substantially reduced levels of DDT in the water by 1979. Cleanup efforts were described in 1979 as a notable environmental success story, suggesting that the cumulative effect of legislation, studies, and bans had reversed the effects of pollution:

The globs of oil, the multicolored industrial discharges, the flotsam from shoreline cities, the fecal and bacterial wastes are no longer dumped in the lakes in vast quantities.

— Time magazine, 1979

Joint U.S.–Canadian agreements pushed 600 of 864 major industrial dischargers to meet requirements for keeping the water clean. One estimate was that $5 billion was spent to upgrade plants to treat sewage. The change toward cleaner water has been in a positive direction since the 1970s.

There was a tentative exploratory plan to capture CO_{2}, compress it to a liquid form, and pump it a half-mile (800 m) beneath Lake Erie's surface underneath the porous rock structure. According to chemical engineer Peter Douglas, there is sufficient storage space beneath Lake Erie to hold between 15 and 50 years of liquid CO_{2} emissions from the 4,000 megawatt Nanticoke coal plant. But there has been no substantial progress on this issue since 2007.

== Economy ==
=== Fishing ===
==== Species of fish ====
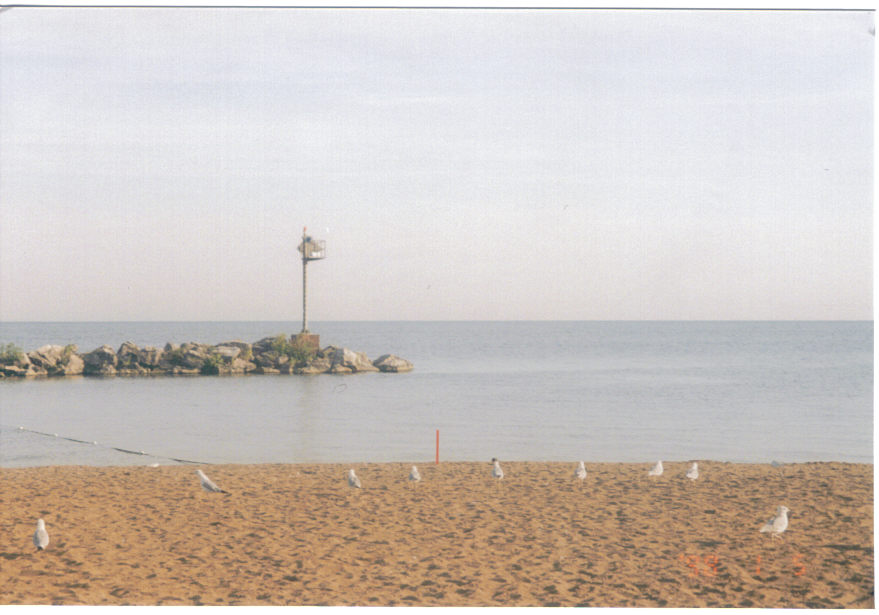
Summer morning west of Cleveland

Lake Erie is home to one of the world's largest freshwater commercial fisheries. Lake Erie's fish populations are the most abundant of the Great Lakes, partially because of the lake's relatively mild temperatures and plentiful supply of plankton, which is the basic building block of the food chain. The lake's fish population accounts for an estimated 50% of all fish inhabiting the Great Lakes. The lake contains steelhead, walleye , largemouth bass, smallmouth bass, perch, lake trout, king salmon, whitefish, smelt, and many others. The lake consists of a long list of well established introduced species. Common non-indigenous fish species include the rainbow smelt, alewife, white perch and common carp. Non-native sport fish such as rainbow trout and brown trout are stocked specifically for anglers to catch. Attempts failed to stock coho salmon, and its numbers are dwindling. Commercial landings are dominated by yellow perch and walleye, with substantial quantities of rainbow smelt and white bass also taken. Anglers target walleye and yellow perch, with some effort directed at rainbow trout.

Up until the end of the 1950s, the most commonly caught commercial fish (more than 50% of the commercial catch) was a subspecies of the walleye known as the blue walleye (Sander vitreus glaucus) sometimes erroneously called "blue pike". In the 1970s and 1980s, as pollution in the lake declined, counts of walleyes which were caught grew from 112,000 in 1975 to 4.1 million in 1985, with estimates of the numbers of walleyes in the lake at around 33 million in the basin, with many of 8 pounds (3.6 kg) or more. Not all walleyes thrived. The combination of overfishing and the eutrophication of the lake by pollution caused the population to collapse, and in the mid-1980s, the blue walleye was declared extinct. But the Lake Erie walleye was reportedly having record numbers, even in 1989, according to one report.

There have been concerns about rising levels of mercury in walleye fish; a study by the Canadian Ministry of the Environment noted an "increasing concentration trend" but that concentrations were within acceptable limits established by authorities in Pennsylvania. Because of the threat of PCBs, It was recommended, that persons eat no more than one walleye meal per month. Because of these and other concerns, in 1990, the National Wildlife Federation was on the verge of having a "negative fish consumption advisory" for walleye and smallmouth bass, which had been the main catch of an $800 million commercial fishing industry.

The longest fish in Lake Erie is reportedly the sturgeon which can grow to 10 feet (3.0 m) long and weight 300 pounds (140 kg), but it is an endangered species and mostly lives on the bottom of the lake. In 2009, there was a confirmed instance of a sturgeon which was caught and released, raising hopes about a resurgence of the species.

==== Commercial fishing ====
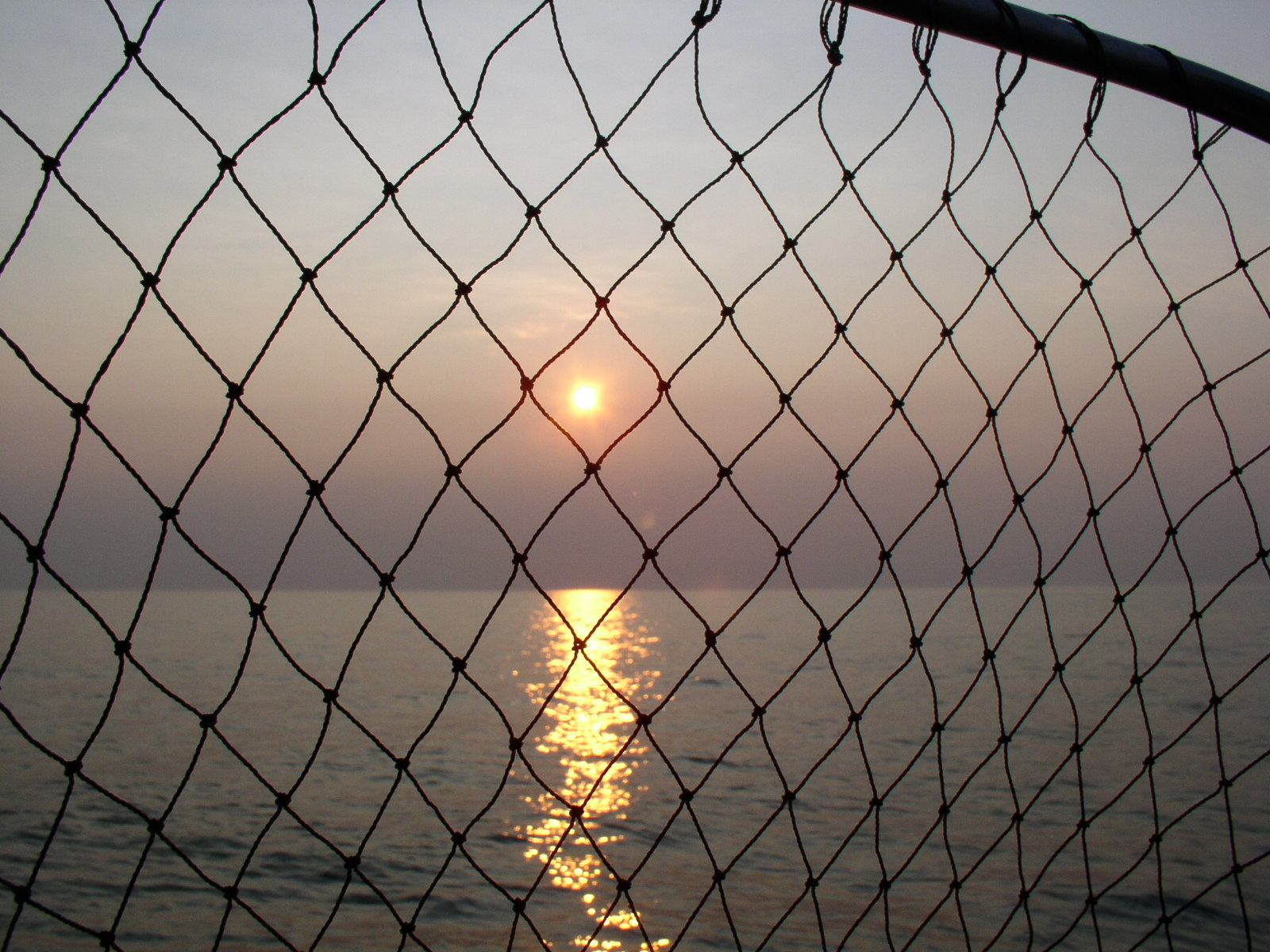
Sunset on Lake Erie seen through a fishing net

Estimates vary about the fishing market for the Great Lakes region. In 2007, one estimate of the total market for fishing in the Great Lakes, including commercial and recreational fishing, was $4 billion annually. Another estimate was more than $7 billion. But since high levels of pollution were discovered in the 1960s and 1970s, there has been continued debate over the desired intensity of commercial fishing. Commercial fishing in Lake Erie has been hurt by pollution as well as government regulations which limit the size of their catch; one report suggested that the numbers of fishing boats and employees had declined by two-thirds in recent decades. Another concern had been that pollution in the lake, as well as toxins found inside fish, were working against commercial fishing interests.

U.S. fishermen based along Lake Erie lost their livelihood over the past few decades and no longer catch fish such as whitefish for markets in New York. Pennsylvania had a special $3 stamp on fishing licenses to help "compensate commercial fishermen for their losses", but this program ended after five years. One blamed the commercial fishing ban on a "test of wills" between commercial and recreational fishermen: "One side needed large hauls. The other feared the lake was being emptied."

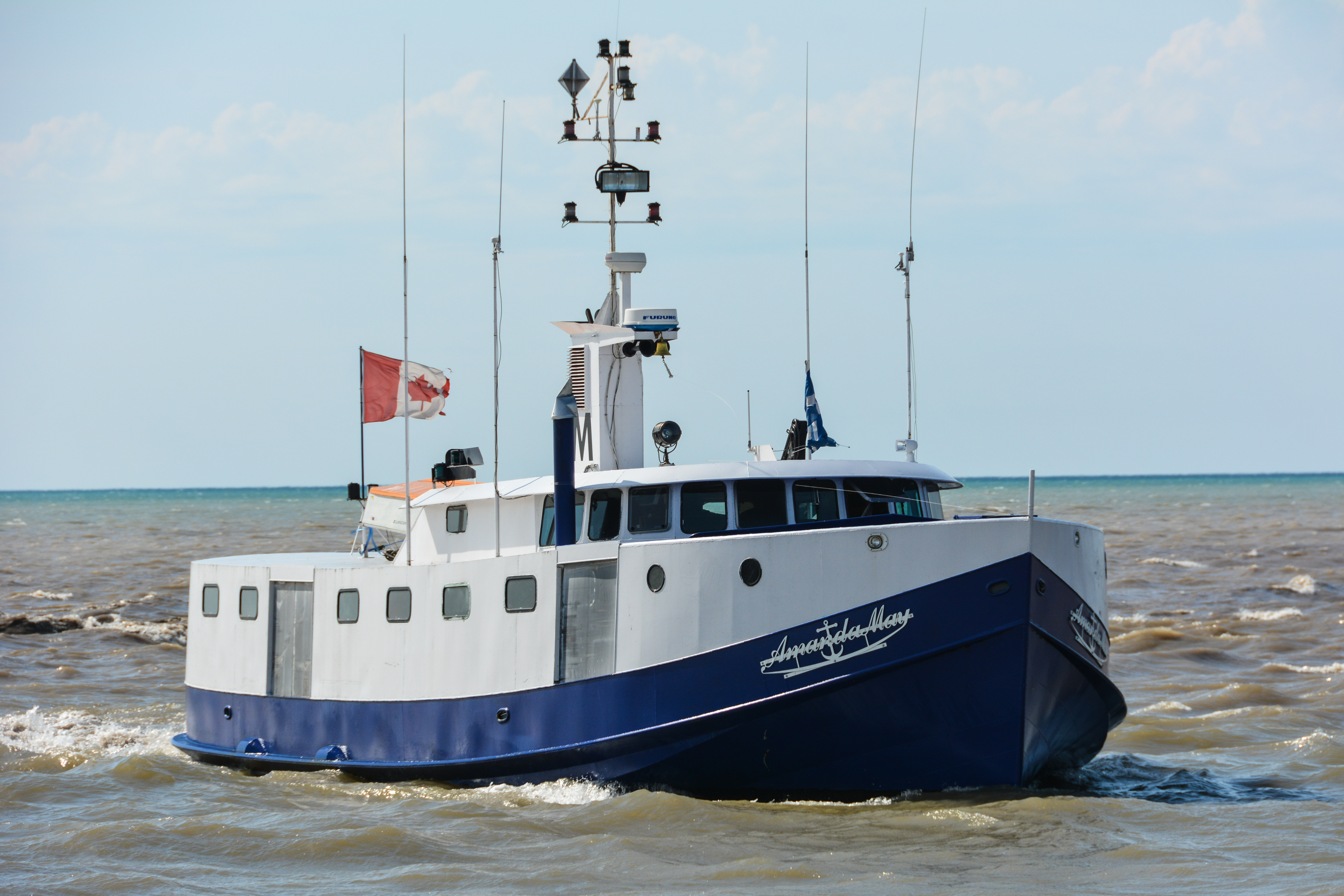
Canadian commercial fishing boat coming into the harbor at Port Burwell on Lake Erie

Commercial fishing is now predominantly based in Canadian communities, with a much smaller fishery—largely restricted to yellow perch—in Ohio. The Ontario fishery is one of the most intensively managed in the world. However, there are reports that some Canadian commercial fishermen are dissatisfied with fishing quotas and have sued the government about this matter, and there have been complaints that the legislative body writing the quotas is dominated by the U.S. and that sport fishing interests are favored at the expense of commercial fishing interests. Cuts of 30 to 45 percent for certain fish were made in 2007. The Lake Erie fishery was one of the first fisheries in the world managed on individual transferable quotas and features mandatory daily catch reporting and intensive auditing of the catch reporting system. Still, the commercial fishery is the target of critics who would like to see the lake managed for the exclusive benefit of sport fishing and the various industries serving the sport fishery. According to one report, the Canadian town of Port Dover is the home of the lake's largest fishing fleet.

==== Government regulations ====
The lake can be thought of as a common asset with multiple purposes, including being a fishery. There was direct competition between commercial fishermen and sport fishermen (including charter boats and sales of fishing licenses) throughout the lake's history, with both sides seeking government assistance from either Washington or Ottawa, and trying to make their case to the public through newspaper reporting. But other groups have entered the political process as well, including environmentalists, lakefront property owners, industry owners and workers seeking cost-effective solutions for sewage, ferry boat operators, even corporations making electric-generating wind turbines.

Management of the fishery is by consensus of all management agencies with an interest in the resource and work under the mandate of the Great Lakes Fishery Commission. The commission makes assessments using sophisticated mathematical modeling systems. The commission has been the focus of considerable recrimination, primarily from angler and charter fishing groups in the U.S. which have had a historical antipathy to commercial fishing interests. This conflict is complex, dating from the 1960s and earlier, with the result in the United States that, in 2011, commercial fishing was mostly eliminated from Great Lakes states. One report suggests that battling between diverse fishing interests began around Lake Michigan and evolved to cover the entire Great Lakes region. The analysis suggests that in the Lake Erie context, the competition between sport and commercial fishing involves universals and that these conflicts are cultural, not scientific, and therefore not resolvable by reference to ecological data.

==== Sport fishing ====
The lake supports a strong sport fishery. While commercial fishing declined, sport fishing has remained. The deep cool waters that spawn the best fishing are in the Canadian side of the lake. As a result, a fishing boat that crosses the international border triggers the security concerns of border crossings, and fishermen are advised to carry their passport. If their boat crosses the invisible border line in the lake, upon returning to the American shore, passengers need to report to a local border protection office.

In 2008, the Pennsylvania Fish and Boat Commission tried stocking the lake with brown trout in an effort to build what's called a put-grow-and-take fishery. There was a report that charter boat fishing increased substantially on the American side, from 46 to 638 charter boats in operation in Ohio alone, during a period from 1975 to 1985 as pollution levels declined and after populations of walleye increased substantially in the lake. In 1984, Ohio sold 27,000 nonresident fishing permits, and sport fishing was described as big business. In 1992, there were accounts of fishermen regularly catching walleye weighing up to 12 pounds (5.4 kg). It is possible to fish off piers in winter for burbot; the burbot make a midwinter spawning run and is reportedly one of Erie's glacial relics.

==== Ice fishing ====
In winter when the lake freezes, many fishermen go out on the ice, cut holes, and fish. It is even possible to build bonfires on the ice. But venturing on Lake Erie ice can be dangerous. In a 2009 incident, warming temperatures, winds of 35 miles per hour (56 km/h) and currents pushing eastward dislodged a miles-wide ice floe which broke away from the shore, trapping more than 130 fishermen offshore; one man died while the rest were rescued by helicopters or boats.

The day began with fishermen setting down wooden pallets to create a bridge over a crack in the ice so they could roam farther out on the lake. But the planks fell into the water when the ice shifted, stranding the fishermen about 1,000 yards offshore ... When fishermen realized late Saturday morning that the ice had broken away, they began to debate the best way off. Some chose to sit and wait for authorities, while others headed east in search of an ice bridge ... Others managed to get to land on their own by riding their all-terrain vehicles about five miles east to where ice hadn't broken away. ... When the rescued fishermen made it to shore, authorities had them line up single-file to take down their names.

— John Seewer, February 2009

=== Agriculture ===
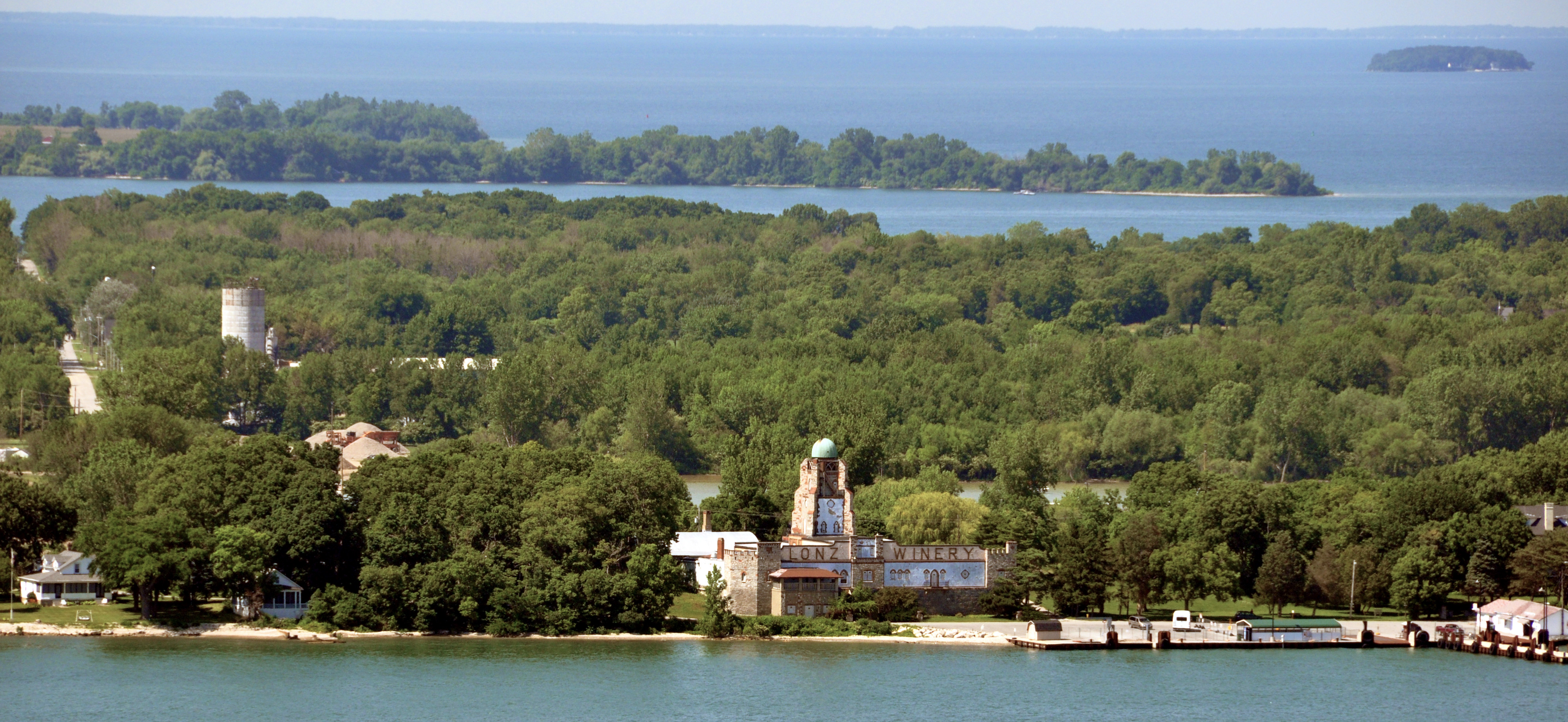
The former Lonz Winery on Middle Bass Island, Ohio at one time was one of the largest wineries in the world

The lake's formerly more extensive lakebed creates a favorable environment for agriculture in the bordering areas of Ontario, New York, Ohio, and Pennsylvania. The Lake Erie sections of western New York have a suitable climate for growing grapes, and there are many vineyards and wineries in Chautauqua County and Erie County. The Canadian region of Lake Erie's north shore is becoming a more prominent wine region as well; it has been dubbed the Lake Erie North Shore, or LENS region, and includes Pelee Island, and since it is farther north than comparable wine-growing areas in the world, the length of the days in the summer are longer. A longer growing season because of the lake-moderated temperatures make the risk of early frosts less likely.

The drainage basin has led to well fertilized soil. The north coast of Ohio is widely referred to as its nursery capital.

=== Tourism ===
==== Diving for shipwrecks ====
Lake Erie is a favorite for divers since there are many shipwrecks, perhaps 1,400 to 8,000 according to one estimate, of which about 270 are confirmed shipwreck locations. Research into shipwrecks has been organized by the Peachman Lake Erie Shipwreck Research Center, located on the grounds of the Great Lakes Historical Society. Most wrecks are undiscovered but believed to be well preserved and at most 200 feet (61 m) below the water surface. One report suggests there are more wrecks per square mile than any other freshwater location, including wrecks from Indigenous watercraft. There are efforts to identify shipwreck sites and survey the lake floor to map the location of underwater sites, possibly for further study or exploration. While the lake is relatively warmer than the other Great Lakes, there is a thermocline, meaning that as a diver descends, the water temperature drops about 30 degrees Fahrenheit change (17 °C), requiring a wetsuit. One estimate is that Lake Erie has a quarter of all 8,000 estimated shipwrecks in the Great Lakes. They are preserved because the water is cold and salt-free. Divers have a policy of not removing or touching anything at the wreck. The cold conditions make diving difficult, requiring divers with skill and experience. One charter firm from western New York State takes about 1,500 divers to Lake Erie shipwrecks in a typical season from April through October.

Among the diving community, they are considered world class, offering opportunities to visit an underwater museum that most people will never see.

— reporter Shannon M. Nass of the Pittsburgh Post-Gazette, 2010

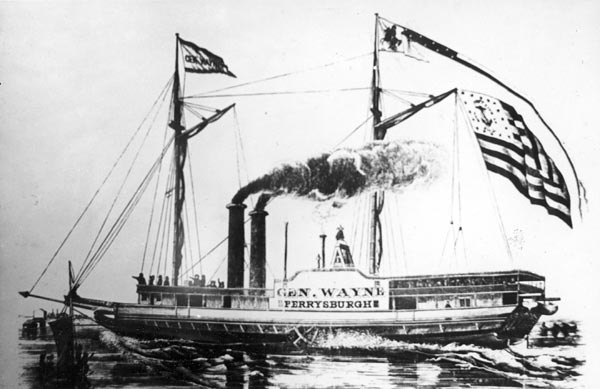
The paddle steamer Anthony Wayne sank in 1850 and was located in 2006 about six miles (9.7 km) north of Vermilion, Ohio.

In 1991, the 19th-century paddle steamer Atlantic was discovered. It had sunk in 1852 after a collision with the steamship Ogdensburg, six miles (9.7 km) west of Long Point, Ontario, and survivors from Atlantic were saved by the crew of Ogdensburg. One account suggests 130 people drowned while another suggests about 20 drowned. There was speculation that the sunken vessel had been a gambling ship, and therefore there might have been money aboard, but most historians were skeptical.

In 1998, the wreckage of Adventure became the first shipwreck registered as an "underwater archaeological site"; when it was discovered that Adventure's propeller had been removed and given to a junkyard. The propeller was reclaimed days before being converted to scrap metal and brought back to the dive site. In 2003, divers discovered the steamer Canobie near Presque Isle, which had sunk in 1921. Other wrecks include the fish tub Neal H. Dow (1910), the "steamer-cum-barge" Elderado (1880), W. R. Hanna, Dundee which sank north of Cleveland in 1900, F. H. Prince, and The Craftsman. In 2007, the wreck of the steamship named after "Mad" Anthony Wayne was found near Vermilion, Ohio, in 50 feet (15 m) of water; the vessel sank in 1850 after its boilers exploded, and 38 people died. The wreck belongs to the state of Ohio, and salvaging it is illegal, but divers can visit. In addition, there are wrecks of smaller vessels, with occasional drownings of fishermen.

==== Public parks ====
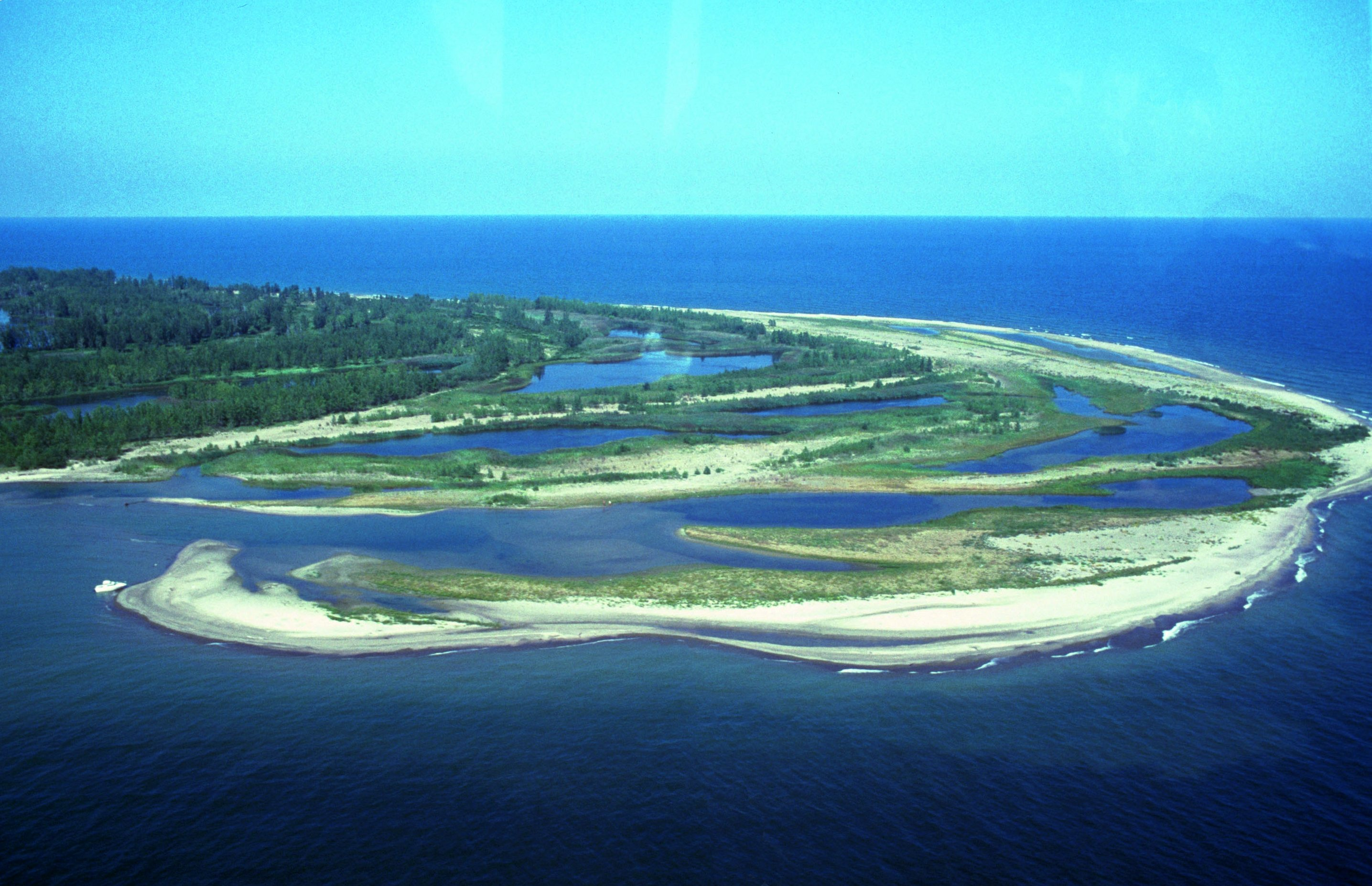
Presque Isle State Park in Pennsylvania is a peninsula in Lake Erie

There are numerous public parks around the lake. In western Pennsylvania, a wildlife reserve was established in 1991 in Springfield Township for hiking, fishing, cross-country skiing and walking along the beach. In Ontario, Long Point is a peninsula on the northwest shore near Port Rowan that extends 20 miles (32 km) into Lake Erie which is a stopover for birds migrating as well as turtles; Long Point Provincial Park is located there and has been designated as a UNESCO Biosphere reserve. In Ontario's Sand Hill Park, east of Port Burwell, there is a 450-foot (140 m) high dune which people climb for picturesque views of the lake. In southern Michigan, Sterling State Park has campgrounds, 1,300 acres (530 ha) for hiking, biking, fishing, boating, with a sand beach for sunbathing, swimming, and picnicking.

==== Biking ====
In 1997, The New York Times reporter Donna Marchetti took a bike tour around the Lake Erie perimeter, traveling 40 miles (64 km) per day and staying at bed and breakfasts. She biked through the cities of Cleveland, Erie, Windsor, Detroit and Toledo as well as resort towns, vineyards, and cornfields. The trip highlights were the "small port towns and rural farmlands of southern Ontario". There are few bike repair shops in Ontario on the route.

==== Islands ====
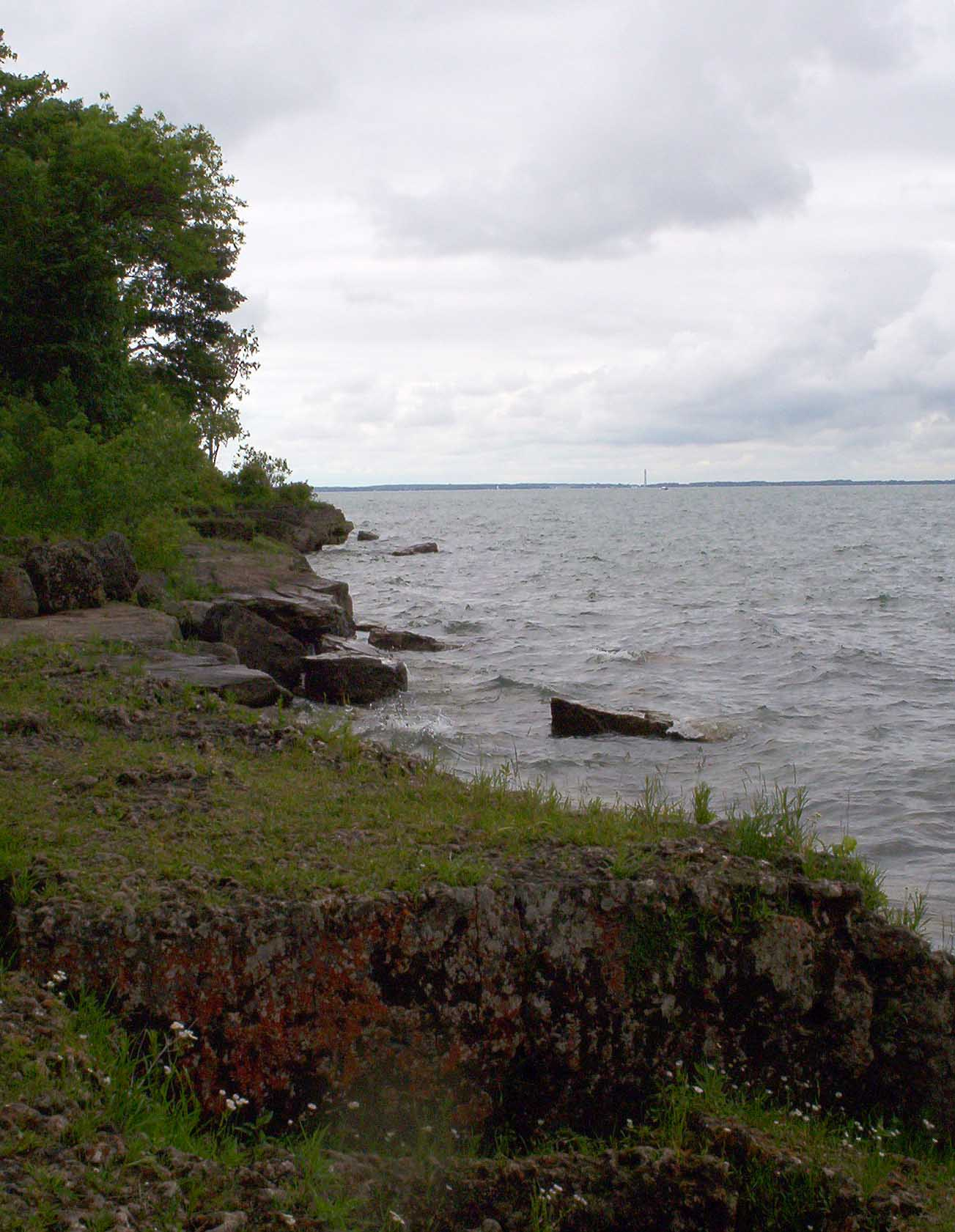
Alvar habitat on Kelleys Island. South Bass Island visible in distance.

Lake Erie islands tend to be in the westernmost part of the lake and have different characters. Some of them include:

- Kelleys Island has activities such as beach lounging, hiking, biking, and viewing the deep glacial grooves in the bedrock limestone.
- Pelee Island is reached by ferry from Leamington, Ontario, or by plane in Port Clinton, Ohio or vehicle ferry in Sandusky, Ohio, and is the largest of the Lake Erie islands. The island has a unique ecosystem with plants rarely found in Canada such as wild hyacinth, yellow horse gentian, and prickly pear cactus. There are two endangered snakes including the blue racer and the Lake Erie water snake. Songbirds migrate there in spring, and monarch butterflies stop over during the fall.
- South Bass Island has the island-village of Put-in-Bay, Ohio. It has been described as a party island with scenic rocky cliffs with a year-round population in the hundreds that grows during summer.

==== Water sports ====
Kayaking has become more popular along the lake, particularly in places such as Put-in-Bay, Ohio. There are extensive views with steep cliffs with exotic wildlife and extensive shoreline. Long-distance swimmers have swum across the lake to set records; for example, a 15-year-old amputee swam the 12-mile (19 km) stretch across the lake in 2001. In 2008, 14-year-old Jade Scognamillo swam from New York's Sturgeon Point to Ontario's Crystal Beach and completed the 11.9-mile (19.2-km) swim in five hours, 40 minutes and 35 seconds, and became the youngest swimmer to make the crossing. It is illegal for swimmers younger than 14 to attempt such a crossing. In Port Dover, Ontario, swimmers do high-dives at the annual "Polar Bear Swim" on the beach. Currents can pose a problem, and there have been occasional incidents of drownings.

==== Lighthouses ====
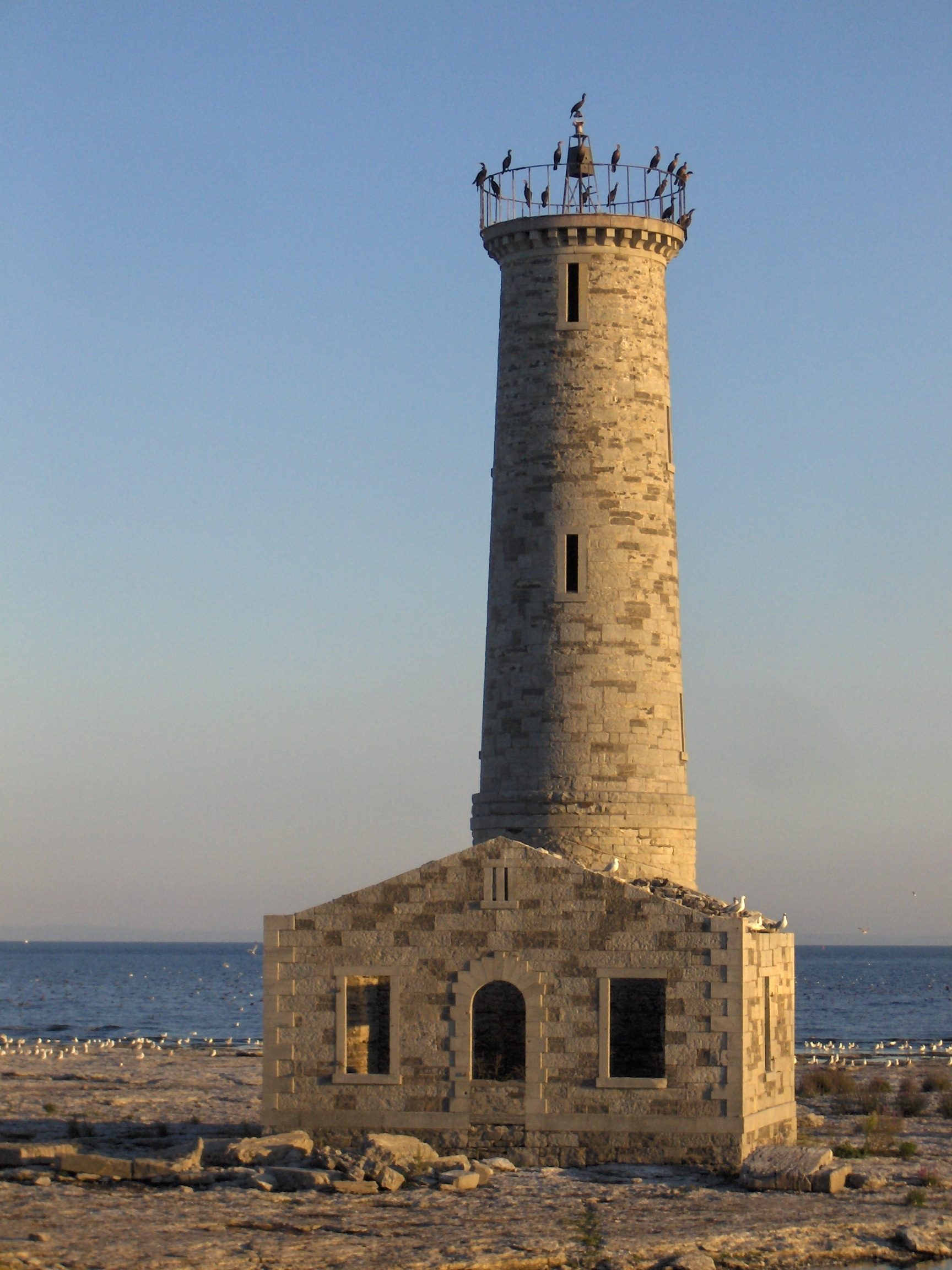
Lighthouse on Mohawk Island, Ontario

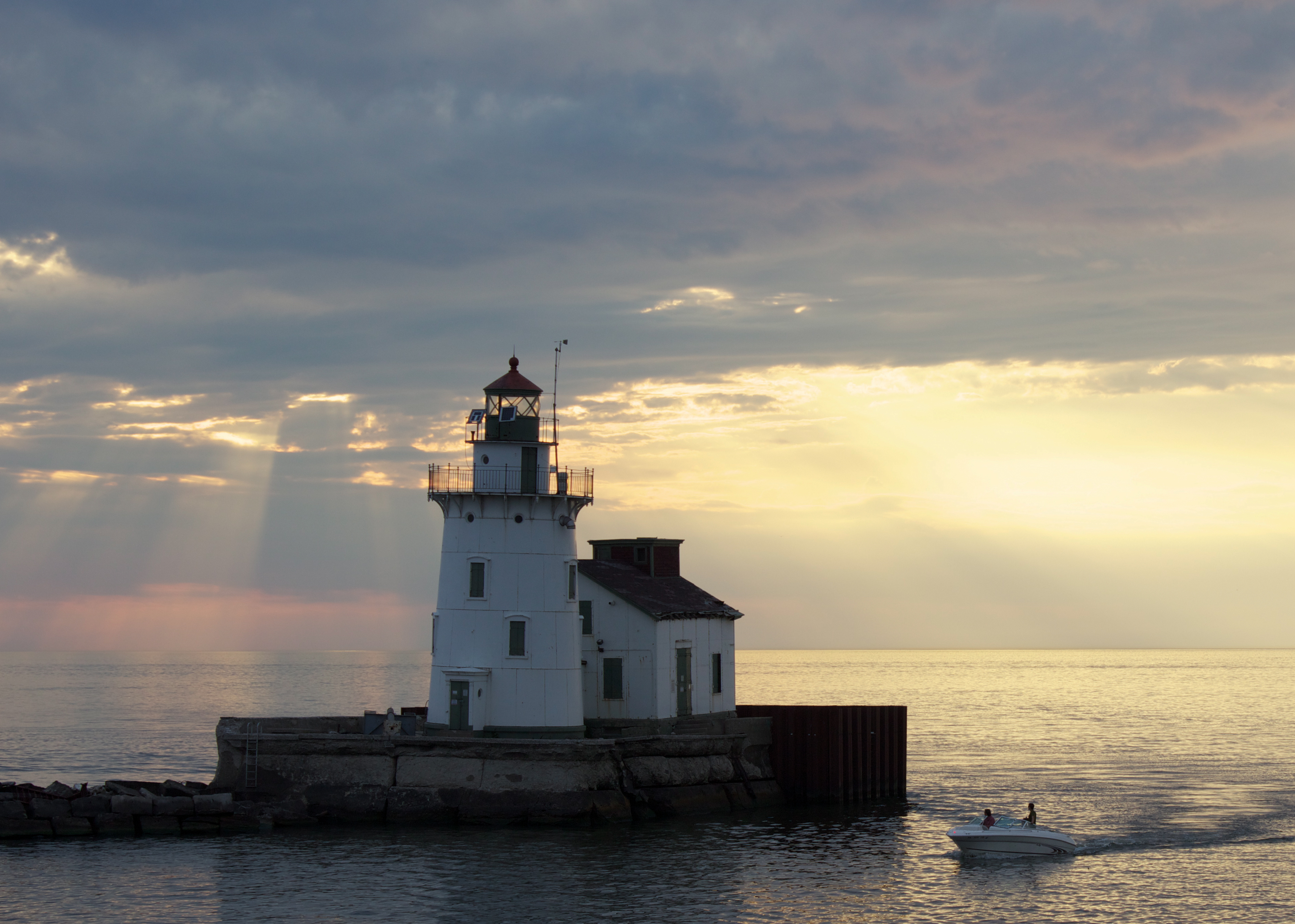
The West Pierhead Lighthouse in Cleveland, Ohio

The lake is dotted by distinct lighthouses. The lighthouses often become coated with ice in winter.

==== Folklore ====
There have been unconfirmed reports of persons spotting a creature akin to the Loch Ness Monster, beginning in the 19th century and sometimes called "Bessie" or "South Bay Bessie". There were reports in 1990 of people seeing a "large creature moving in the water about 1,000 feet (300 m) from their boat" described as black in color, about 35 feet (11 m) long, with a snakelike head, and moving as fast as a boat. Five other people reported seeing something similar on three separate occasions, but there is no scientific evidence of such a creature. There is a Lake Erie Monster beer and a Cleveland Monsters hockey team.

There have been sporadic reports of people in Cleveland being able to see the Canadian shoreline as if it were immediately offshore, even though Canada is 50 miles (80 km) from Cleveland. It has been speculated that this is a weather-related phenomenon, working on similar principles as a mirage.

The Lake Erie Storm Hag is said to inhabit the waters near Presque Isle, luring sailors then attacking them with inclement weather (see Jenny Greenteeth § Similar folk figures around the world).

=== Shipping traffic ===
The lake has been a shipping lane for maritime vessels for centuries. Ships headed eastward can take the Welland Canal and a series of eight locks descending 326 feet (99 m) to Lake Ontario which takes about 12 hours. Thousands of ships make this journey each year. During the 19th century, ships could enter the Buffalo River and travel the Erie Canal eastward to Albany then south to New York City along the Hudson River. Generally there is heavy traffic on the lake except during the winter months from January through March when ice prevents vessels from traveling safely.

In 2007, there was a protest against Ontario's energy policy which allows the shipping of coal in the lake; Greenpeace activists climbed a ladder on a freighter and "locked themselves to the conveyor belt device that helps to unload the ship's cargo"; three activists were arrested and the ship was delayed for more than four hours, and anti-coal messages were painted on the ship.

=== Ferryboats ===
Ferryboats operate in numerous places: such as the passenger-only Jet Express from Port Clinton and Sandusky to Put-in-Bay, Kelleys Island and Cedar Point. The Miller Ferry from Catawba Island to Put-in-Bay and Middle Bass Island, the Kelleys Island Ferry from Marblehead to Kelleys Island, and the Owen Sound Transportation Company ferries from Leamington or Kingsville to Pelee Island and Sandusky.

However, plans to operate a ferryboat between the U.S. port of Erie and the Ontario port of Port Dover ran into a slew of political problems, including security restrictions on both sides as well as additional fees required to hire border inspectors. The project was abandoned.

The Great Lakes Circle Tour is a designated scenic road system connecting all of the Great Lakes and the Saint Lawrence River. Drivers can cross from the United States to the Canadian town of Fort Erie by going over the Peace Bridge.

=== Border crossings ===
Since the border between the two nations is largely unpatrolled, it is possible for people to cross undetected from one country to the other, in either direction, by boat. In 2010, Canadian police arrested persons crossing the border illegally from the United States to Canada, near the Ontario town of Amherstburg.

== See also ==
- Bass Islands
- Cedar Point
- Lake Erie AVA
- List of lakes in Ohio
- Maumee Bay
- 1967 Lake Erie skydiving disaster
- Microcystis
