= Western Basin of Lake Erie =

The Western Basin of Lake Erie is the shallowest and warmest part of the lake, covering approximately 2,600 square miles (6,700 km²). Its average depth is only about 24 feet (7.3 meters), with a maximum depth of 62 feet (19 meters) near the Bass Islands, making the Western Basin highly susceptible to temperature fluctuations and biological activity. The basin’s relatively shallow waters contribute to its ecological dynamics, including the frequent formation of waves and algal blooms.

== Physical Characteristics and Wave Activity ==
Due to its shallow depth, the Western Basin experiences significant wave action even under light wind conditions. A 2004 report by The New York Times noted that “even the slightest breeze can kick up lively waves.” Other observers have confirmed that these waves can develop quickly, affecting navigation and shoreline conditions. The basin’s shallow waters warm rapidly during summer months, which influences both weather patterns and aquatic life.

== Ecological Concerns and Phosphorus Runoff ==
By the 2010s, phosphorus pollution emerged as a major environmental concern in the Western Basin. Much of the phosphorus entering the lake originates from agricultural runoff, particularly from fertilizers applied to no-till corn and soybean fields in the surrounding watershed. Heavy rains wash these nutrients into local streams, which then carry them into the basin. Harmful runoff was managed in the past by the Great Black Swamp, but the draining of the swamp in the late 1800s allowed runoff to flow directly into the lake. Elevated phosphorus levels contribute to harmful algal blooms, including toxic cyanobacteria, which can disrupt ecosystems, harm wildlife, and pose risks to human health.

== Economic and Recreational Importance ==
The Western Basin supports commercial and recreational fishing, with species such as walleye, yellow perch, and smallmouth bass thriving in its waters. The combination of shallow depth and nutrient-rich conditions can affect fish populations, sometimes leading to fluctuating catch rates. Additionally, the basin’s beaches and parks attract tourists and locals alike, contributing to the regional economy.

== Management and Conservation Efforts ==
Efforts to reduce phosphorus inputs have included promoting more sustainable agricultural practices, such as buffer strips and controlled fertilizer application. Restoring the area's indigenous and ecologically important wetlands has also been a topic of discussion in recent years. Agencies and organizations work together to monitor water quality, manage fish populations, and address pollution sources to improve the health of the Western Basin.

== Lighthouses in the Western Basin of Lake Erie ==
- Colchester Reef Light (Lake Erie, West) – Built on Colchester Reef in 1885.
- Detroit River Light – Built at the entrance to the Detroit River in 1885.
