= Owen Brown (abolitionist, born 1824) =

American abolitionist (1824–1889)

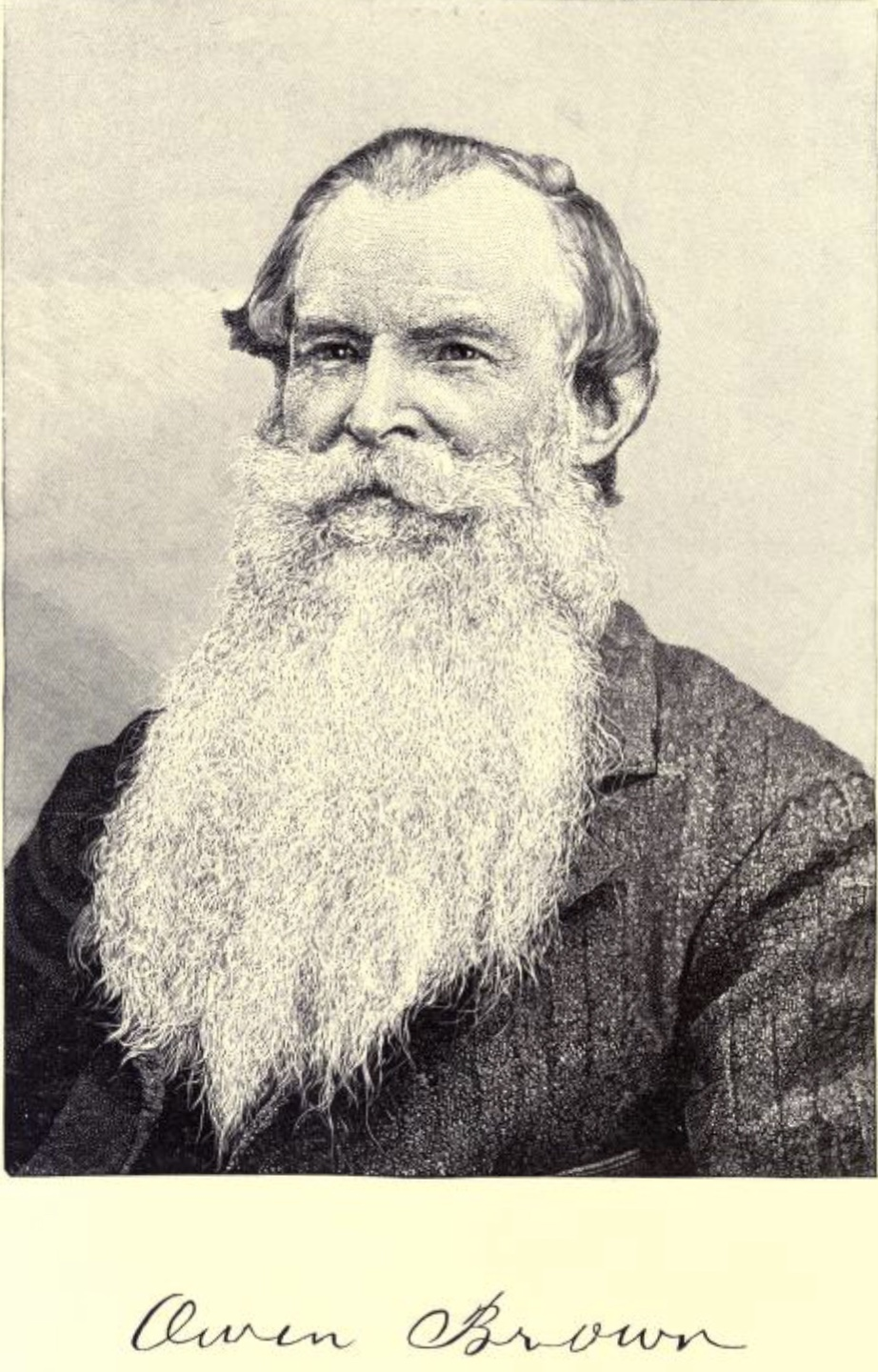
- Brown in 1883
- Born: November 4, 1824; Hudson, Ohio, U.S.
- Died: January 8, 1889 (aged 64); Pasadena, California, U.S.
- Resting place: A hilltop near Altadena, California, 34°13′3″N 118°9′37″W
- Known for: John Brown's raid on Harpers Ferry
- Parent(s): John Brown; Dianthe Lusk Brown
- Relatives: Owen Brown (grandfather); John Brown, Jr. (brother); Watson (half-brother)

Owen Brown (November 4, 1824 – January 8, 1889) was the third son of abolitionist John Brown. He participated more in his father's anti-slavery activities than did any of his siblings. He was the only son to participate both in the Bleeding Kansas activities—specifically the Pottawatomie massacre, during which he killed a man—and his father's raid on Harpers Ferry. He was the only son of Brown present in Tabor, Iowa, when Brown's recruits were trained and drilled. He was also the son who joined his father in Chatham, Ontario, Canada, when the raid was planned; he was chosen as treasurer of the organization of which his father was made president.

== Personal information ==
Owen was named for his grandfather, a prosperous Connecticut tanner, strong abolitionist, and one of the first settlers in Hudson, Ohio.

He described himself as "an engineer on the Underground Railroad" and a "woodsman almost all my life". By this he meant not that he was a lumberjack, but that he could hike through woody terrain—a skill that later saved his life, escaping from the Harper's Ferry debacle. ("[S]o strong is the woodsman in him, that he gave me not only the direction and probable extent of every mountain and valley he passed, night or day, but the nature and quality of the timber almost everywhere in his way.") He never married, and referred to his one-room cabin in Ohio as "bachelor hall". When asked later in life if he had been too busy to marry, his reply was: "Hardly; there are men who fix their affections on one, and losing that one remain single ever after." According to a writer who felt that Owen "seems to have been a bachelor from principle", he "went so far as to divulge the fact that there was one maiden near Springdale [Iowa] whom he would marry, if he ever married at all, but to whom, out of abundant caution, he had resolved never even to speak."

He was much affected by the death of his mother, along with his newborn brother Frederick, when he was eight.

His burial site, atop a hill near Altadena, California, has become a minor tourist destination, reached via a public hiking trail. In 2024 the site was designated a Los Angeles County historical landmark.

== Resemblance to his father ==
=== Physically ===
Of John Brown's six adult sons, he was said to be the one that most resembled his father physically; he was "exactly like the portraits of his father", "he bore the likeness of his father more perfectly than either of his brothers [Jason and John Jr.], and in many characteristics was like him." He was described thus in the 1859 warrant for his arrest:

Owen Brown is thirty-three or thirty-four years of age, about six feet in height, with fair complexion, though somewhat freckled—has red hair, and very heavy whiskers of the same color. He is a spare man, with regular features, and has deep blue eyes.

==== Owen's arm injury ====
According to his father, "Owen [was] to some extent a cripple from childhood by an injury of the right arm". In his will, his father referred to Owen's "terrible suffering in Kansas and crippled condition from his childhood". He "had been badly injured after the campaign of June, and afterward very ill in Iowa, whither he had gone to regain his health. John referred repeatedly to "our crippled and destitute unmarried son". He wrote Lydia Maria Child: "I have a middle-aged son [Owen was 35], who has been in some degree a cripple from his childhood, who would have as much as he could well do to earn a living. He was a most dreadful sufferer in Kansas, and lost all he had laid up. He has not enough to clothe himself for the winter comfortably. I have no living son or son-in-law who did not suffer terribly in Kansas."

The nature of the injury is something Owen did not talk about. Brown biographer Richard Hinton only had vague information: "he had been physically unfortunate, when younger, in the injury of an arm or shoulder, I think, through which he had suffered so severely as to prematurely age him, and produced a trouble of some kind by which he was subject to drowsiness. This, as well as being crippled in his arm, rendered him incapable of any very hard labor." One source says the injury was the result of "throwing a stone when a boy"; another, that Owen was "seriously crippled in his Kansas campaigns, and unfit for service in the Union army in consequence".

=== Psychologically ===
He was also said to most resemble his father psychologically:

There was in Owen Brown, it is said[,] much of that excess of zeal, which is called sometimes eccentricity and sometimes fanaticism, and which was the characteristic of John Brown of Ossawatomie. Like his father, he was perfectly inflexible in carrying out what he had determined upon, and his courage was absolutely dauntless. He was renowned among his acquaintances for his passion for exact justice, and was honored by them for his sterling uprightness and integrity.

Another reporter said that Owen, of John Brown's sons, "is perhaps the greatest character of them all. Noticeably eccentric, with a strange mingling of gentleness and roughness, sentiment and course practicability [sic], which even his intimate friends cannot understand, with one of the warmest of hearts and the readiest hand, he leads a wandering kind of life, seeming to cut himself off from old friends and associations, and yet after a while returning to them, or letting them know by some kind message that they are not forgotten. He seems literally a man without a home, for realizing his restless disposition he has never married or formed any ties that could not easily be shaken off. He resembles his father in form and feature, and also—though in an exaggerated degree—his independence of the world's opinion."

== Comments on his personality ==
- He was "a man of eccentric character, humorous and kindly, and endowed with one of those wonderful memories in which every past scene and event seems preserved exactly as it befell, no matter how long the intervening time. His narration of his adventures was minute to the least point. ...The friendliest of men."
- "There was a gentle courtesy in the talk and manner of these two men [Owen and John Jr.] that I cannot write down for you; and I surely never met so thorough, genuine modesty."
- "Like his brother Jason, who survives him, Owen was strong in stature, noble, brave, manly, yet kind and gentle as a woman, as sweet in disposition as a child; his character pure, almost Christ-like. I might add that no race of men, perhaps, in the present century better exemplified the true Christian character than this same family of Browns, from the rugged, brave old martyr, John Brown, to the gray-haired, patient Jason, who returns alone to his mountain home."
- Owen's hermit life in California provoked much comment. "Very eccentric, kind-hearted, but improvident."
- He was compared with Thoreau, though "without his learning and genius." He had been "mentally astray for some time."
- "It is said that in stature and general features, Owen much resembled his father, but in mental characteristics, particularly during his last days, he was decidedly different, there being in his composition a conspicuous absence of that energy, push and spirit for which the elder Brown was noted. ...Retired in manners, he was a man of peace, gentle as a child, holding no ill feelings toward anyone, exhibiting no hatred, even to those who brought about his father's execution. ...Though industrious, neither he nor Jason had the knack of accumulating property, any surplus money or means they had being given to the poor. In fact, it was said by those who knew them best that the Browns could get nothing nor keep the little they had."
- Owen was "generous to a fault, giving poorer neighbors all that he earns except the merest pittance for his own simple wants."
- "He bore the likeness of his father more perfectly than either of his brothers, and in many characteristics was like him. He possesses a strong constitution, iron nerve, capable of great physical endurance, loving most forgiveness and mercy, and still possessing that true courage which from conviction of right knows no fear.
  "In 1855, with his brothers he settled in Kansas, near Osawatomie. As a pioneer on the plains of Kansas, he first encountered the iron heel of American slavery. He grappled with the monster, and the first blood of that great struggle was shed; not at Sumter, but on the plains of Kansas. He was the last living representative of the 23 men who so severely wounded the monster Slavery at Harpers Ferry; was one of the five who escaped. His connection with the anti-slavery cause until its overthrow has become a matter of history. Like his father, he never undertook a service which he did not fully believe merited the blessing of God. Stern and just when occasion demanded, but no man ever saw mankind more tender or forgiving, or happier in time of peace when he was able to add something to the measure of human happiness. An earnest advocate of temperance always, self-sacrificing, even at great personal loss, he found more happiness in defending a principle, in helping the poor or rescuing the unfortunate, than in an earthly gain. Thus his life has been spent in doing good always, reverencing the Great Master whom he faithfully served, believing that the golden rule applied to all mankind should be the rule of life."

== Abolitionist activities ==
=== Kansas ===
Owen fought together with his father in Kansas and was present at the sack of Lawrence. Border ruffians from Missouri burned his house and stole his cattle. He participated, along with brother-in-law Henry Thompson, in the Pottawatomie massacre. "He was imprisoned, ill-treated, and finally driven from the State, for the sole reason that he was an abolitionist." In 1888 and 1889 he recalled some of his Kansas activities.

=== Harpers Ferry ===
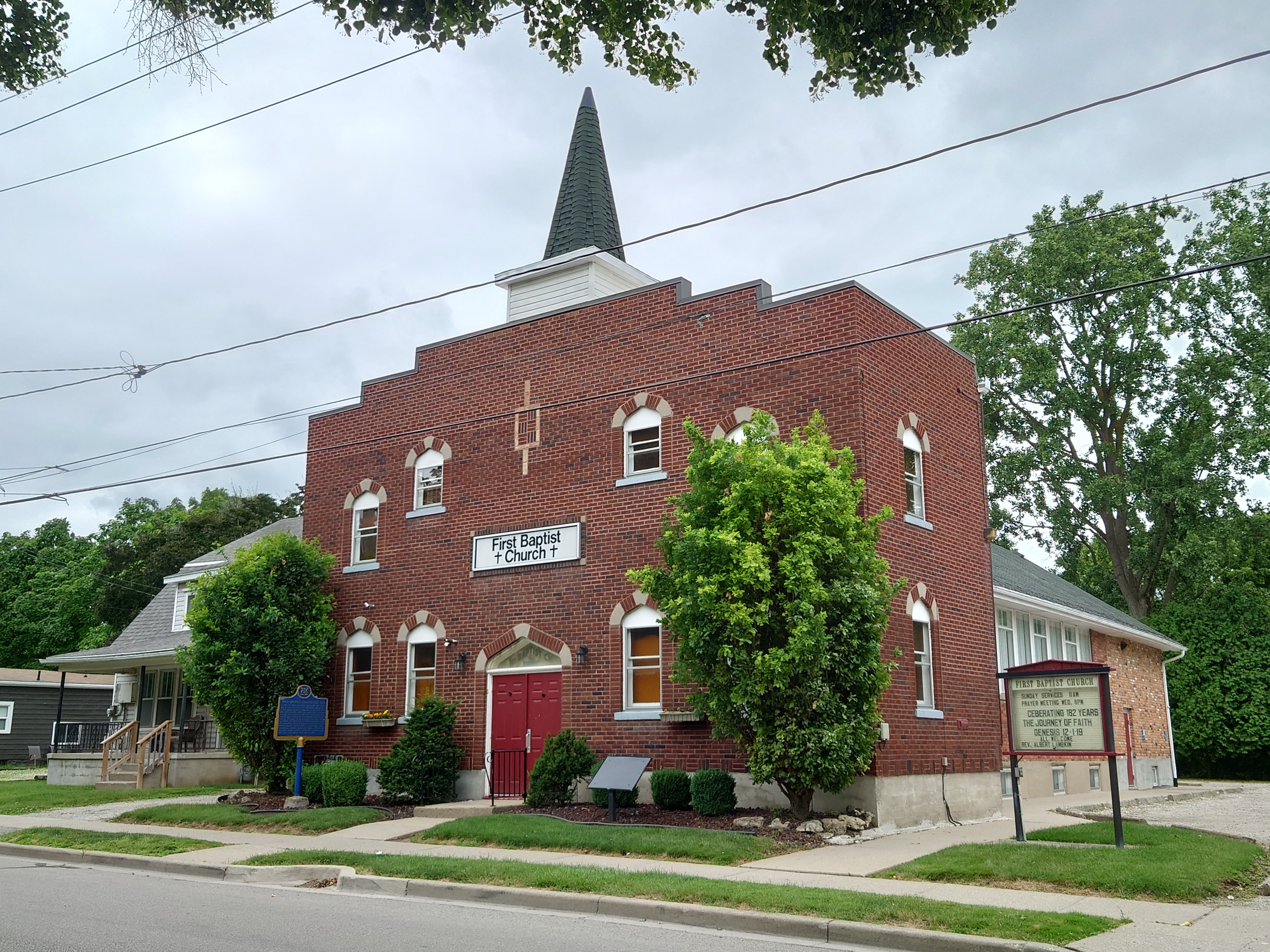
First Baptist Church in Chatham, Ontario, where John Brown's 1858 convention took place

Owen was the only child of Brown to participate in the Chatham, Ontario, meeting in which the raid was planned. He was chosen as treasurer of the organization, of which John Brown was president.

Owen, as he told it later, before the raid "spent many months in the mountains of the South, searching out suitable places for the rendezvous and concealment of liberty-seeking slaves". During the three months before the raid, his father, under cover of prospecting for minerals, examined and approved of a number of them.

Owen participated in his father's raid on Harpers Ferry in 1859. He was guarding weapons at the Kennedy Farm, in Maryland, and did not enter Harpers Ferry itself. When the raid failed, with a $25,000 reward on his head (equivalent to $895,833 in 2025), he escaped capture and underwent what has been called "the most difficult and tedious flight that ever occurred in this country". After nearly three months of hiding and travelling at night, living on raw potatoes and uncooked corn taken from fields and nearly starving, his shoes having given out, he arrived at Crawford County, Pennsylvania, where he had lived as a child . There he was fed and helped recuperate by a Quaker who remembered his father. Now near the Ohio border, he reached the safety of the home of his brother John Jr., at that time in Dorset, Ashtabula County, Ohio, some 300 miles (480 km) from Harpers Ferry. Together with him in John Jr.'s home for three weeks were fellow escaped raiders Barclay Coppock and Francis Jackson Meriam, as well as Brown's first biographer, James Redpath.

In early February 1860 Owen was indicted by a Virginia grand jury for "conspiring with slaves to create an insurrection". On March 8, 1860, the new governor of Virginia, John Letcher, announced a $500 reward (equivalent to $17,917 in 2025) for his apprehension and delivery to Virginia. The Attorney General of Ohio, Republican Christopher Wolcott, refused to honor Virginia's request for Owen's arrest and extradition. Owen remained in Ohio for many years.

Owen was the last surviving member of the raiding party; his older brothers John Jr. and Jason did not participate, and his half-sister Annie Brown Adams outlived him, but was sent home from the Kennedy farm before the raid.

== Put-in-Bay, Ohio ==
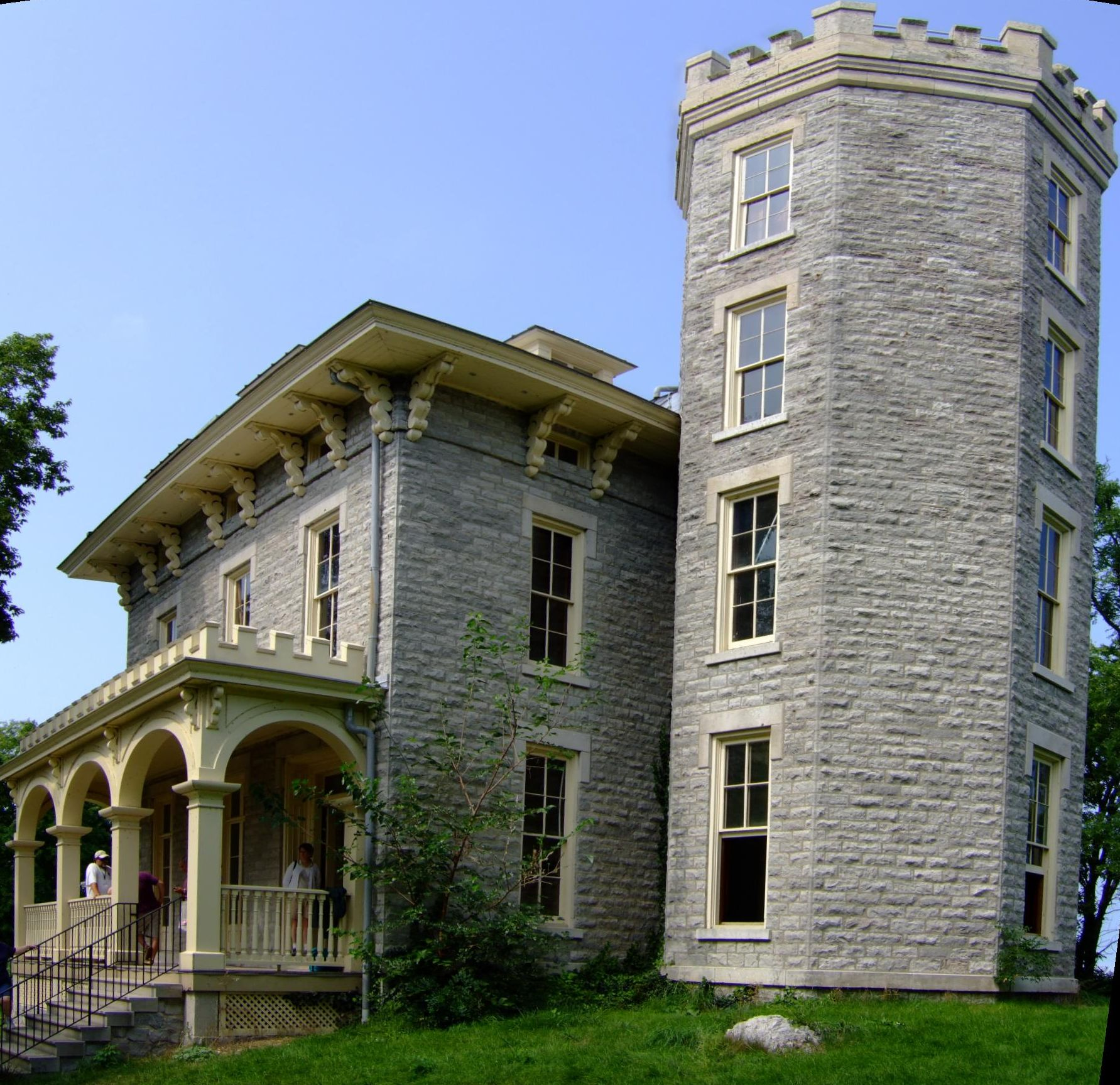
The so-called "Cooke Castle", Gibraltar Island, Ohio

Owen was "extremely averse to talking at all about the exciting adventures of his early days". A reporter had to make many visits to get him to tell the story of his difficult escape, which he said he had never told in 12 years. Mark Twain's comment on this report was: "Three different times I tried to read it but was frightened off each time before I could finish."

At that time Owen and his older brother John Jr. were farming at Put-in-Bay, Ohio, Owen in a "one-roomed shanty", full of mementos, near his brother's house. "Everything in the room was neat and tidy, but very cheap and rude. He had a cot for a bed, and heat was supplied by a little stove fed with dry cuttings from the grapevines." Ruth Brown, their sister, and her husband lived there as well, having moved in 1882 from Wisconsin to another "very small, unpainted" house.

Locals described Owen as "extremely eccentric". He spent the winter months, and sometimes the summer months as well, alone, except for a dog, as a hermit on neighboring Gibraltar Island, caretaker for the home of Ohio financier Jay Cooke. He spent much of his time fishing. John Henry Kagi had taught him shorthand while they were training in Iowa in 1857–58. He continued his study from books and copied the Bible in shorthand twice. He remained there until 1885, when the Cooke property was sold.

== Pasadena, California ==
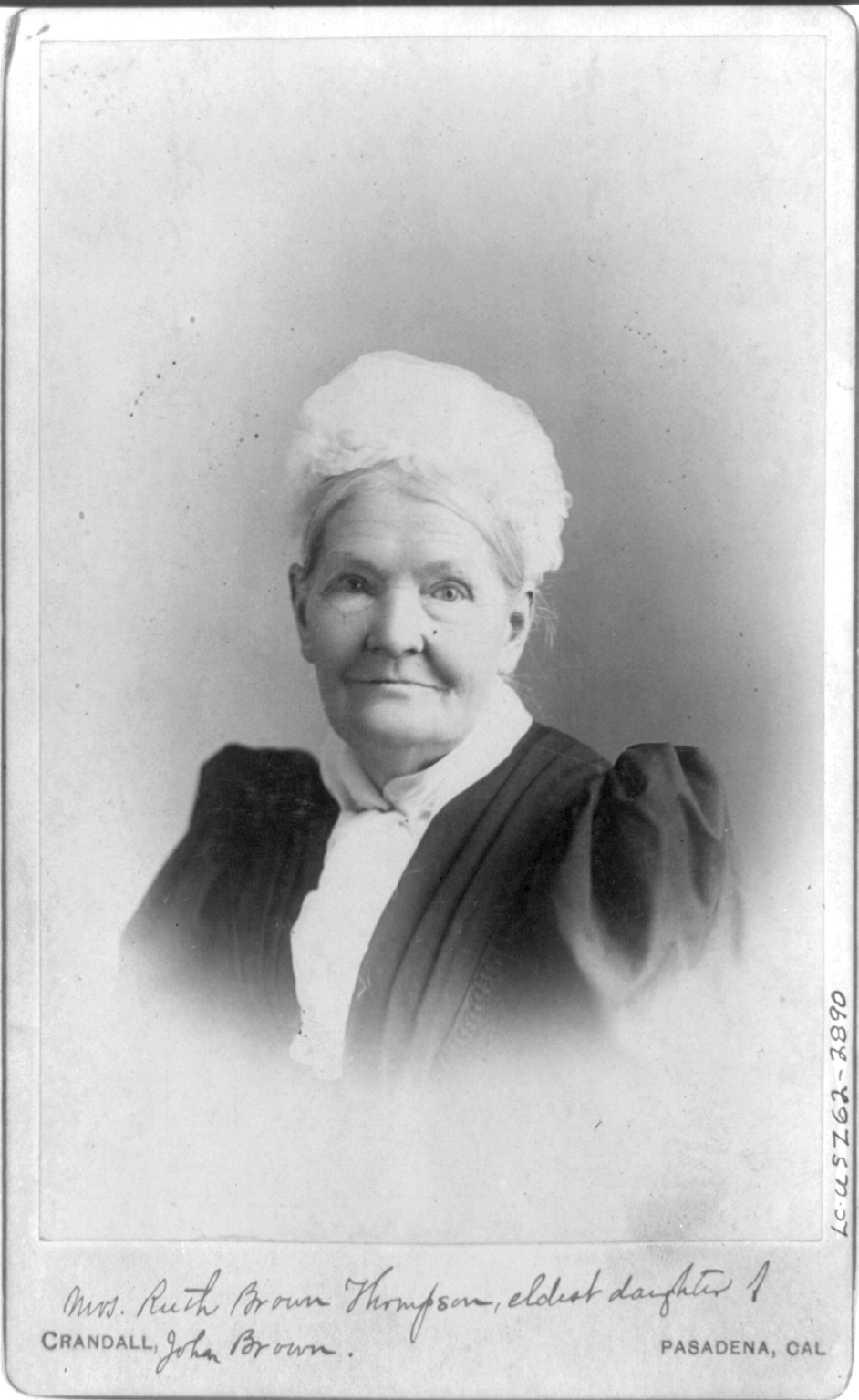
Ruth Brown Thompson, eldest daughter of John Brown

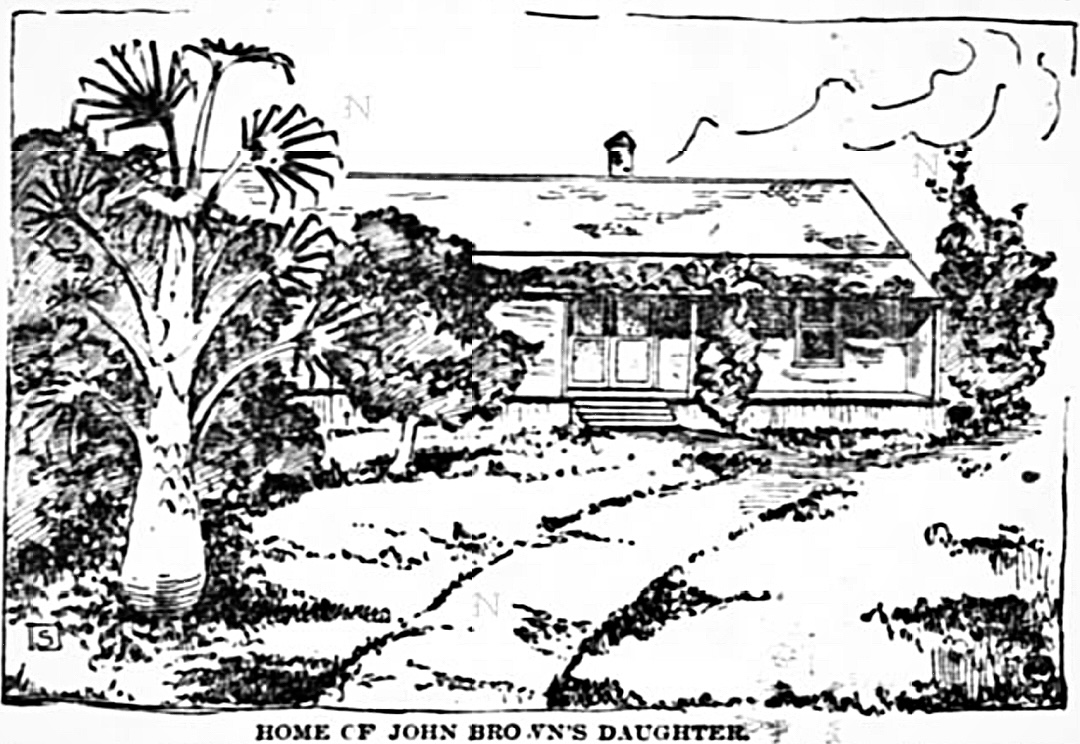
House of Ruth Brown Thompson and her husband, Pasadena, California, 1893

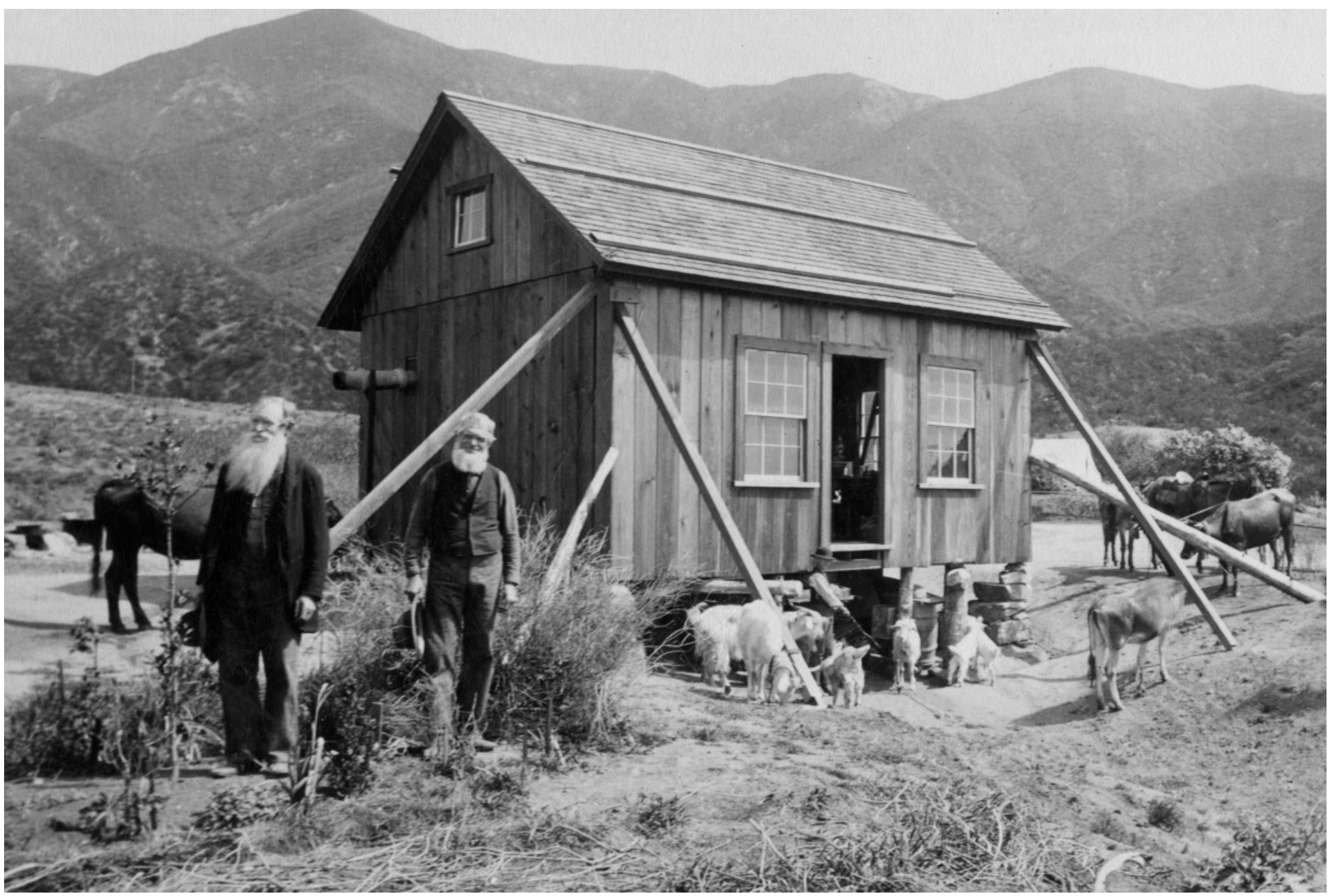
The first cabin of Owen (left) and Jason Brown, near Altadena, California. The beams protect from the winds high on the hill. This cabin was destroyed by fire in 1888.

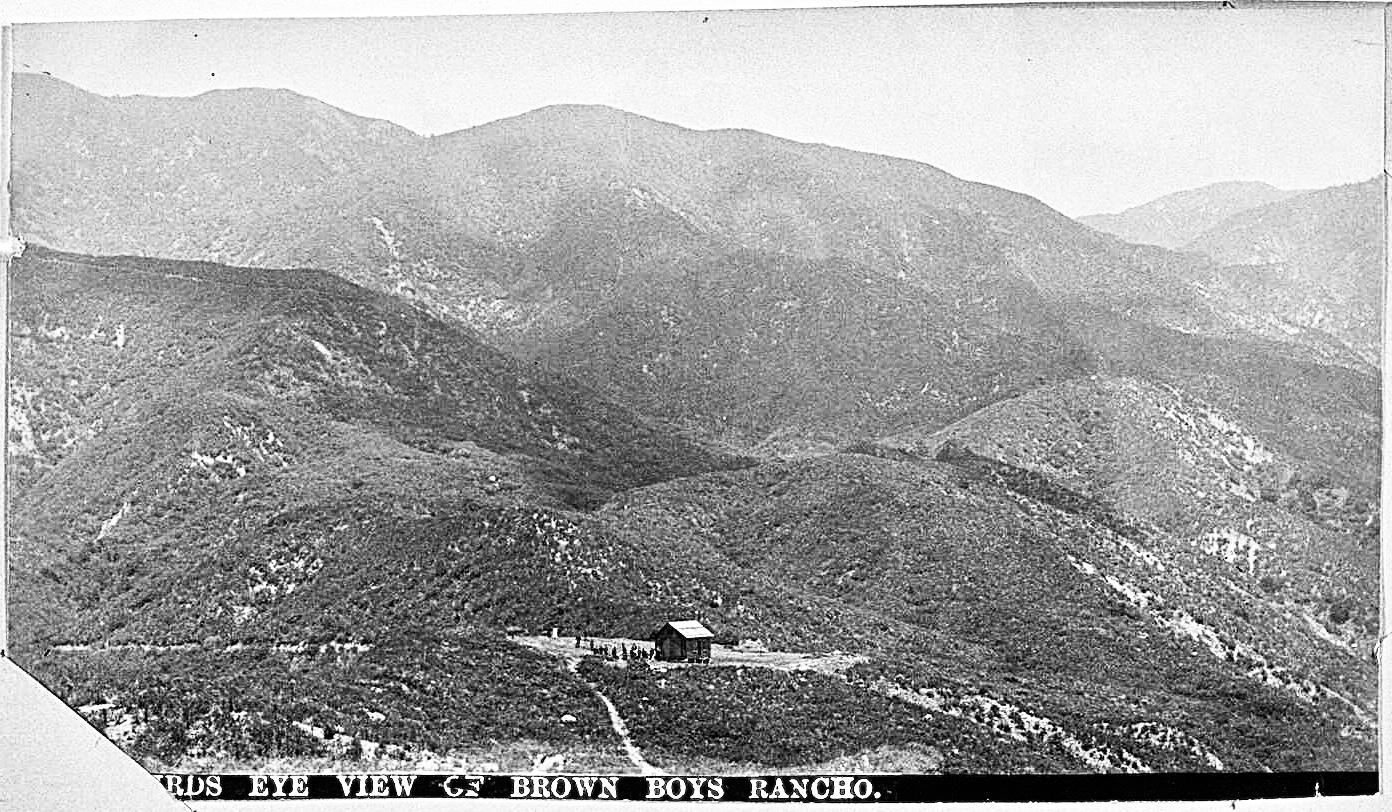
Bird's-eye view, Brown boys' rancho (first cabin). Note the visitors. The supporting beams have not yet been installed.

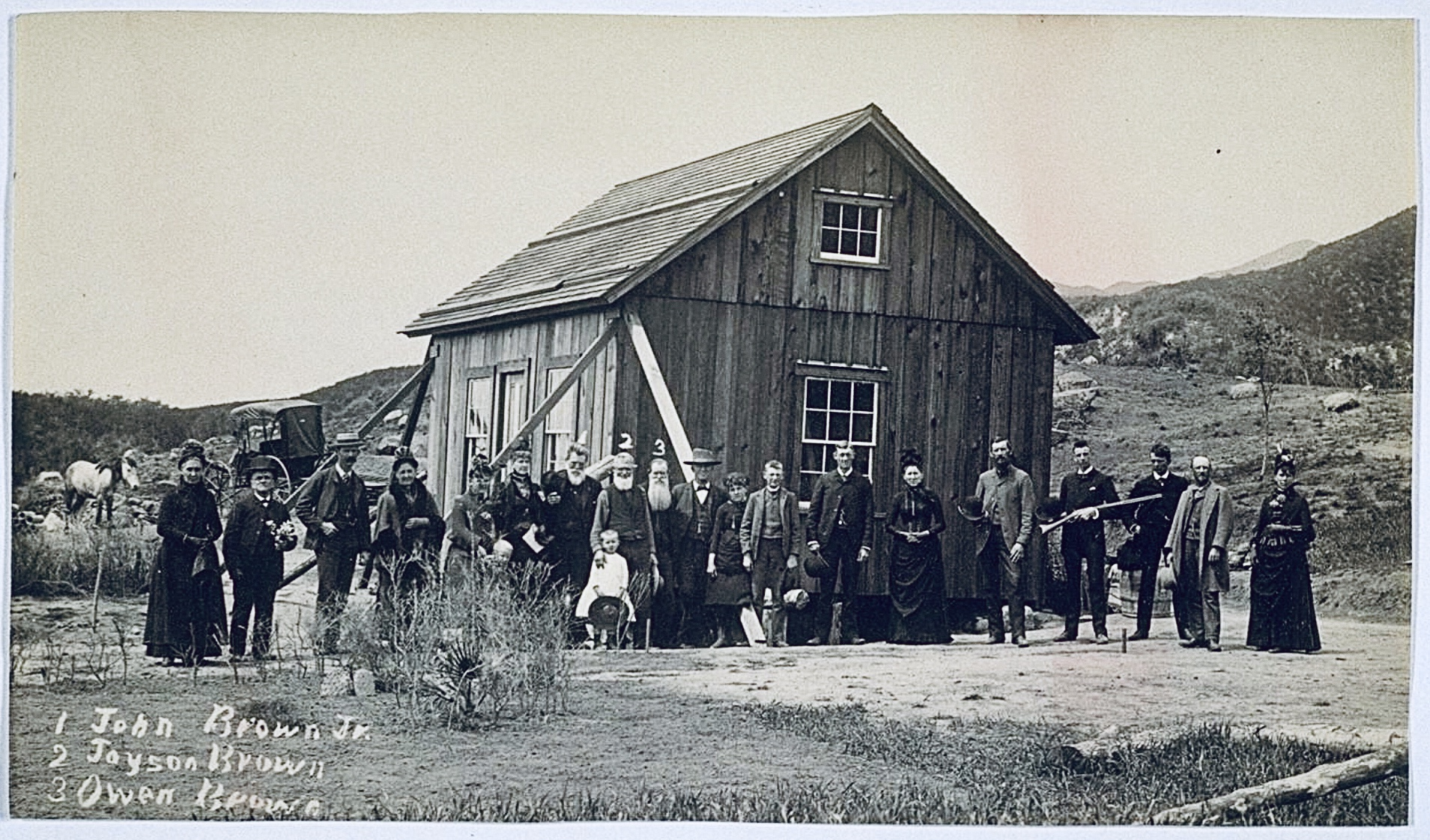
Visitors at the Brown boys' cabin

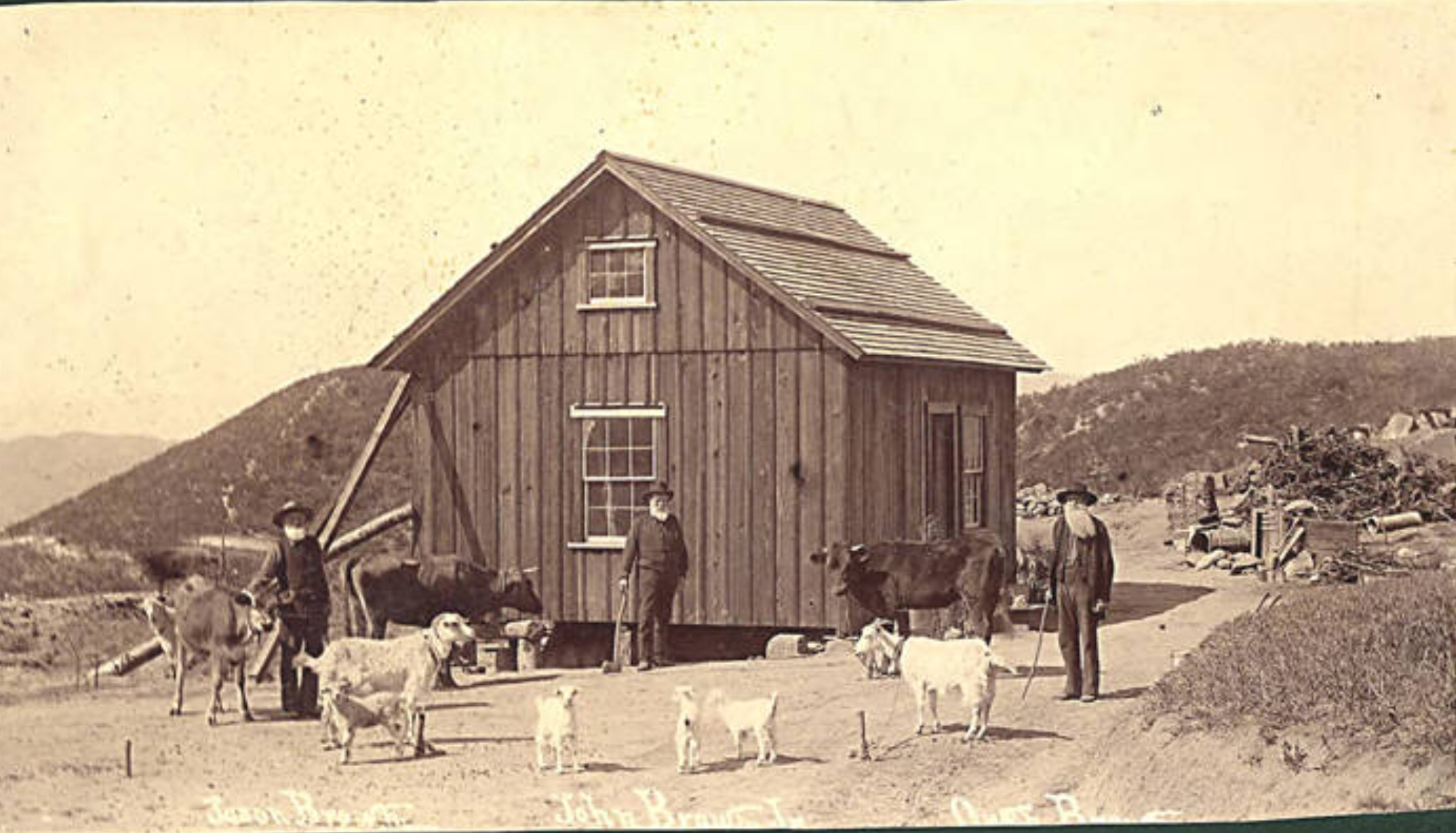
The second cabin, at a higher elevation. Left to right, Jason, John Jr., and Owen Brown, with their livestock. 1888? John Jr. is visiting.

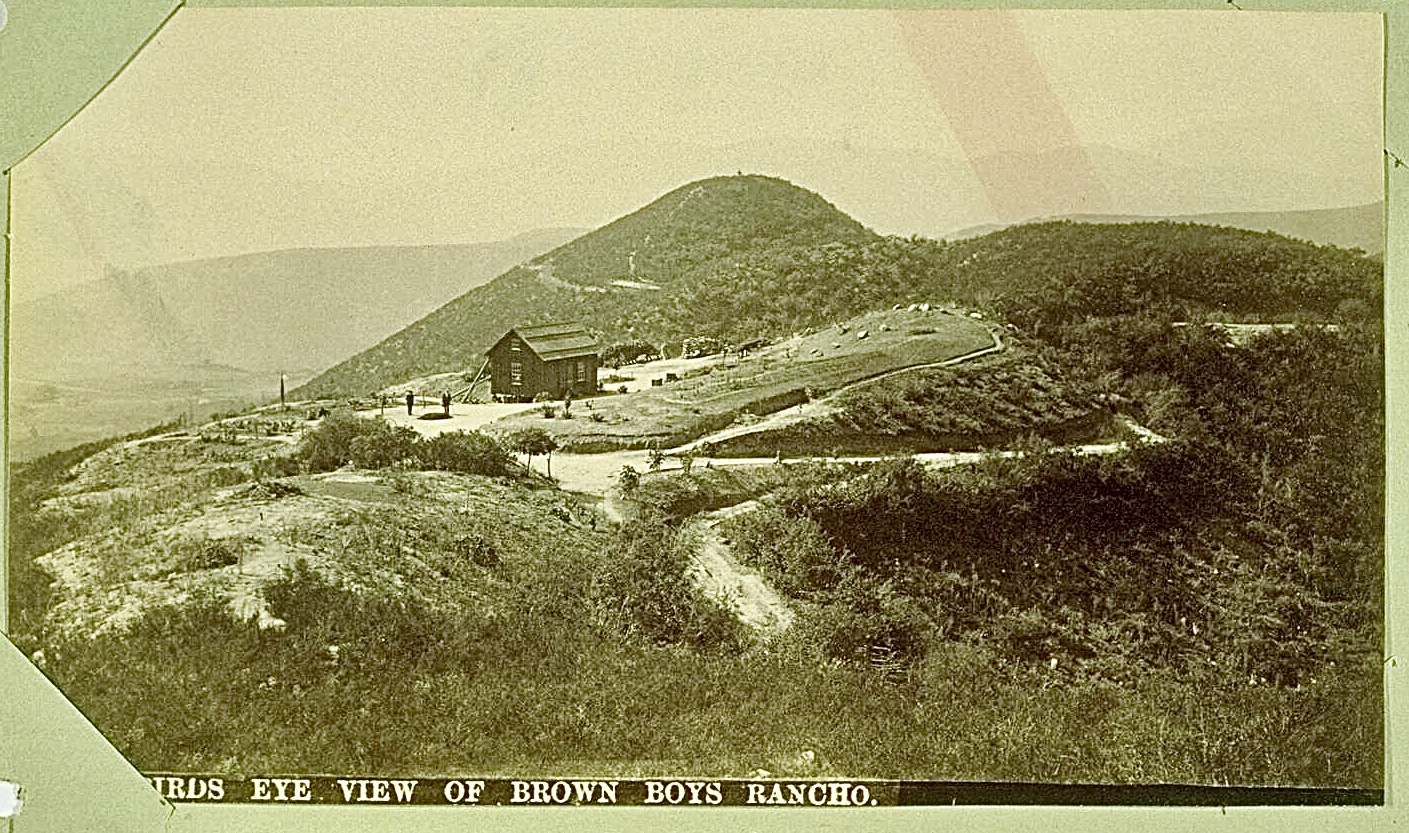
Jason and Owen Brown's second cabin, Altadena, California. In the background is Little Round Top.

In 1885, his health failing, Owen moved to Pasadena, California, joining his brother Jason, who emigrated in 1881 after his Akron, Ohio, home was destroyed by fire, and sister Ruth, a teacher, and her husband Henry Thompson, who moved there with their family in 1884; Henry had bought 15 acres (6.1 ha) of land. They were seeking to escape "the increasingly negative broad popular memory of Brown." John Jr. came to visit subsequently, to see if he should move there too, but he decided not to.

Jason had a wife and children in the east. "He goes to visit them occasionally, and they have been here, but why they are separated no one seems to know."

Pasadena was sympathetic to the memory of John Brown; it was a Republican city, settled by immigrants from Indiana. Owen, Jason, and to a lesser extent Ruth and her husband were treated as celebrities, the men "eccentric and charming". However, Owen "suffered from the celebrity which his adventures and his father's fame gave him; and this was one reason why he retired with his brother to a remote cabin, where, nevertheless, sight-seers and importunate friends followed him, and left him very little of that solitary leisure which he so much valued." A different source says the brothers "delighted in having callers"; yet another, that they were guides for tourists. "They were much visited by tourists and citizens, some from mere curiosity and other[s] from a warm sympathy with the heroic career of the family." They were "often" visited by the naturalist Charles Frederick Holder, who talked with them about their experiences and the Underground Railroad. According to one report, "it was difficult to get Owen to speak of the tragic events of his life", but another says that "to listen to his recital of their escape was as thrilling and much more interesting than stories of the most daring of fictitious heroes." "Owen Brown had related to his sister Ruth all the particulars of the expedition to the South with a colored man named Green, and she will publish this with many valuable memorandas of her father not yet printed"; this publication never took place.

An obituary reveals that besides raising poultry and cows, Jason and Owen, through "selling their photographs", "received enough barely to survive". At the time (1886–1889), to print a picture using ink onto paper or card stock was expensive, as it required a human engraver, but making photographic copies was much easier. There was then no amateur photography, the equipment and the processing were too expensive and cumbersome, but well-to-do travelers bought as souvenirs photographs of sights they saw, made available by local photographers. The Brown boys' cabins, with them and sometimes visitors outside, were photographed several times for this purpose, for souvenir pictures which the men sold. Their mountain cabins were only a mile from the house of Ruth Brown Thompson, their sister, and her husband, in Pasadena.

During the visit of the veterans of the Grand Army [of the Republic] to Los Angeles they joined in an excurson to the beautiful suburb, Pasadena. The fact that Jason and Owen Brown, together with their sister and her husband, Mr. and Mrs. Thompson, are living near Pasadena, and were in town, did not seem to become known to the visiting soldiers until late in the afternoon. When it was known, the children of the old hero of Ossawattomie were put into a carriage, the horses unhitched, and with a long rope the Kansas, Iowa, and California boys formed in procession and hauled the family through the streets, the band at the head of the line playing "John Brown's Body," and the whole enthusiastic crowd singing the stirring battle hymn and cheering. The demonstration visibly affected the occupants of the carriage. When the procession reached the depot Owen Brown made a pithy and characteristic speech.

Owen and Jason Brown won the respect of their neighbors, "but their ideas of law and justice were as peculiar as their father's. They kept to themselves their charities, and they were always quick to help anyone who was persecuted. When the boycott was placed upon the Chinese in Los Angeles county, three years ago [1886, see Chinese Exclusion Act] Owen and Jason went down into Pasadena and hired each a Chinaman to work on his place for the sake of the principle, although they had no need of the Celestials' labor, and would be troubled to find money to pay for it. They refused to take interest on money when they had any to loan. When some friends raised a contribution for them, they asked that the money be sent instead to the colored sufferers of the 1886 Charleston earthquake."

According to an obituary:

About five years ago Jason and Owen Brown took a homestead on a bench of mountain land five or six miles north of Pasadena, at the settlement now called Las Casitas. This they subsequently sold and took land higher up the mountain side, built a cabin, cleared and worked a few acres, and li[v]ed there—two feeble old men, alone. ...They were much visited by tourists and citizens, some from mere curiosity and others from a warm sympathy with the historic career of the family. They had made a good wagon trail up to their mountain hermitage, and were continuing it as a donkey path to the top of the mountain known as Brown's Peak, but it is not completed yet. Owen had a desire to be buried on the top of Brown's Peak; and if Jason ever succeeds in finishing the trail he will try to have his brother's grave up there as he desired.

Jason wrote, in an 1886 letter, "The people of Pasadena are eastern, mostly, and are very kind to us; they raised over $100 (~$3,583 in 2025), a short time ago without our knowing it, and gave it to us to buy a cow." When John Jr. visited them (see picture at right), and decided not to stay, they had to sell the cow to get money for John Jr.'s return east.

There, they were celebrated and supported, not for helping their father end slavery, but for a more contemporary movement, temperance. Owen became "one of the best known of Pasadena's early residents." The two "feeble old men", as an obituary described them, were "much visited by tourists and the curious". An as-yet unidentified photographer carried his equipment up the mountain on several occasions, and left us good pictures of both cabins, including the second one seen from above.

=== Temperance ===
"He was a zealous advocate of temperance, to advance which was the great aim of his later life." Owen believed that what he called "the rum power" was a bigger evil than slavery, "and he gave himself to its destruction with the same devotion, and the same love that he gave to liberty". Celebrating the contemporary temperance campaign was a means to avoid dealing with their father's radical egalitarianism and recourse to violence. Owen and Jason were honorary members of the Women's Christian Temperance Union.

An obituary noted that he sent "fruit and sympathy" to the anarchists on trial in the Haymarket affair. At the time of his death Owen was living with his sister Ruth in addition to brother Jason.

== Death and funeral ==
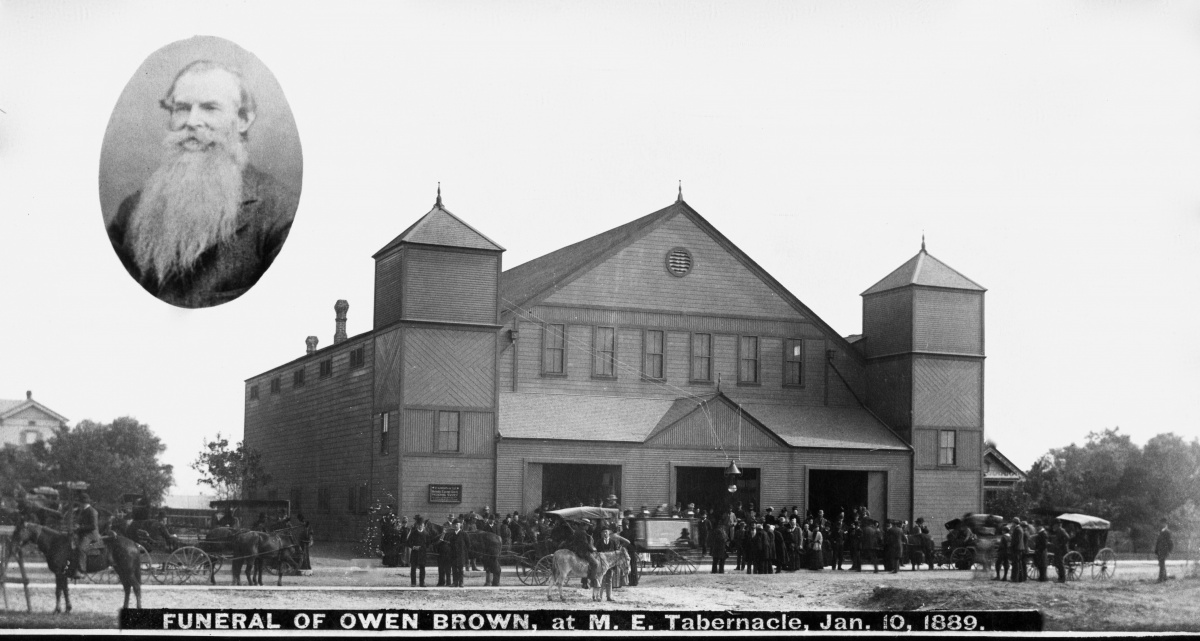
Souvenir of Owen Brown's funeral, Pasadena, California, in 1889. Building is Methodist Tabernacle.

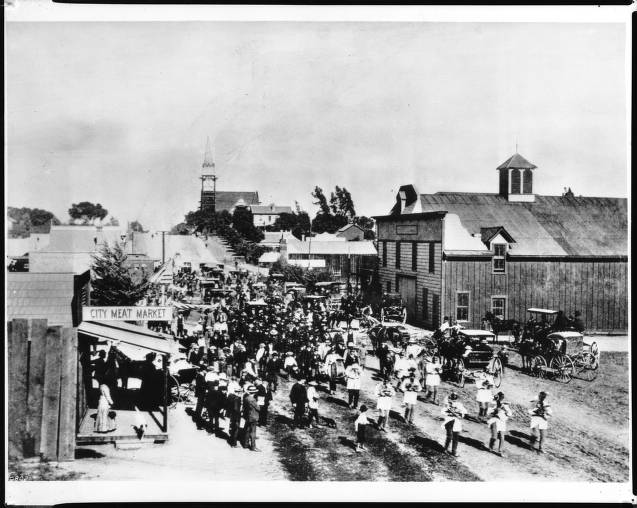
Funeral procession of Owen Brown. Note the marching band.

Shortly before his death, a friend asked Owen for his autograph and sentiment. Above his name, he wrote: "The only true religion is to be true to every human being, and to all animals so far as it is possible, and be just." His last intelligible words were: "It is better—to be—in a place—and suffer wrong—than to do wrong."

Owen died of pneumonia January 8, 1889, at the home of his sister Ruth Brown Townsend, in Pasadena, California, at the age of 64. His death was reported across the country.

January 10 was called by a newspaper "a historic day for Pasadena". His funeral, led by a Quaker, was the largest ever held in Pasadena; at least 1,800 people attended. Four ministers spoke—Methodist Episcopal, Quaker, Congregational, and Universalist—followed by "a temperance speaker". The city trustees attended as a body, as did students from the Pasadena Academy. Six pallbearers had known John Brown in Massachusetts, Iowa, or Kansas; among then were John Hunt Painter and James Townsend, who had known him from Springdale, Iowa. There were four stations set up along the route for photographers. "John Brown's Body" was sung.

A marching band escorted the 2,000 mourners, nearly the entire population of Pasadena, in the funeral procession up to Little Roundtop Hill in West Altadena in the Meadows (34.216199°N 118.161381°W). Owen had asked to be buried on the hilltop near his cabin, in a spot called sublime, "on one of the highest peaks of the Sierra Madre mountains, commanding a view of the valley below for 60 miles (97 km), the sea and even the islands of the sea." It was subsequently called Brown Mountain.

In May 1889, a newspaper remarked that "the tomb of Owen Brown receives as much attention from visitors as any other point of interest in the Sierra Madre range. It is not uncommon to see fresh flowers laid upon the mound, which appears as barren for want of grass as when first made."

Jason left the cottage when Owen died, and found employment in the Sierra Madre with the new, scenic Mount Lowe Railway. He lived at Echo Mountain, a railway junction. His wife and children never came to California. He returned to Ohio, but in 1895 was about to return to California, to live with his sisters.

== Grave marker ==
Nine years later, a gravestone, paid for by pallbearer Major H. N. Rust, was placed at the grave site. It read: "Owen Brown, Son of John Brown, the Liberator, died Jan. 9, 1889." Two iron ornaments, a heavy hook on the left, and a 6" diameter ring on the right, were attached to eyelets in the marker and could be moved—symbolizing freedom from the shackles of slavery and rapture from mortal bounds. 200 people attended the dedication.

The marker disappeared from the grave site in 2002, along with the concrete base and surrounding rail fencing, after the property on which it was located was sold. No legal action was taken, as the person or persons responsible have never been identified. In 2012, the missing gravestone was found a few hundred feet from the gravesite. In 2021, it was announced that the gravestone would be reinstalled.

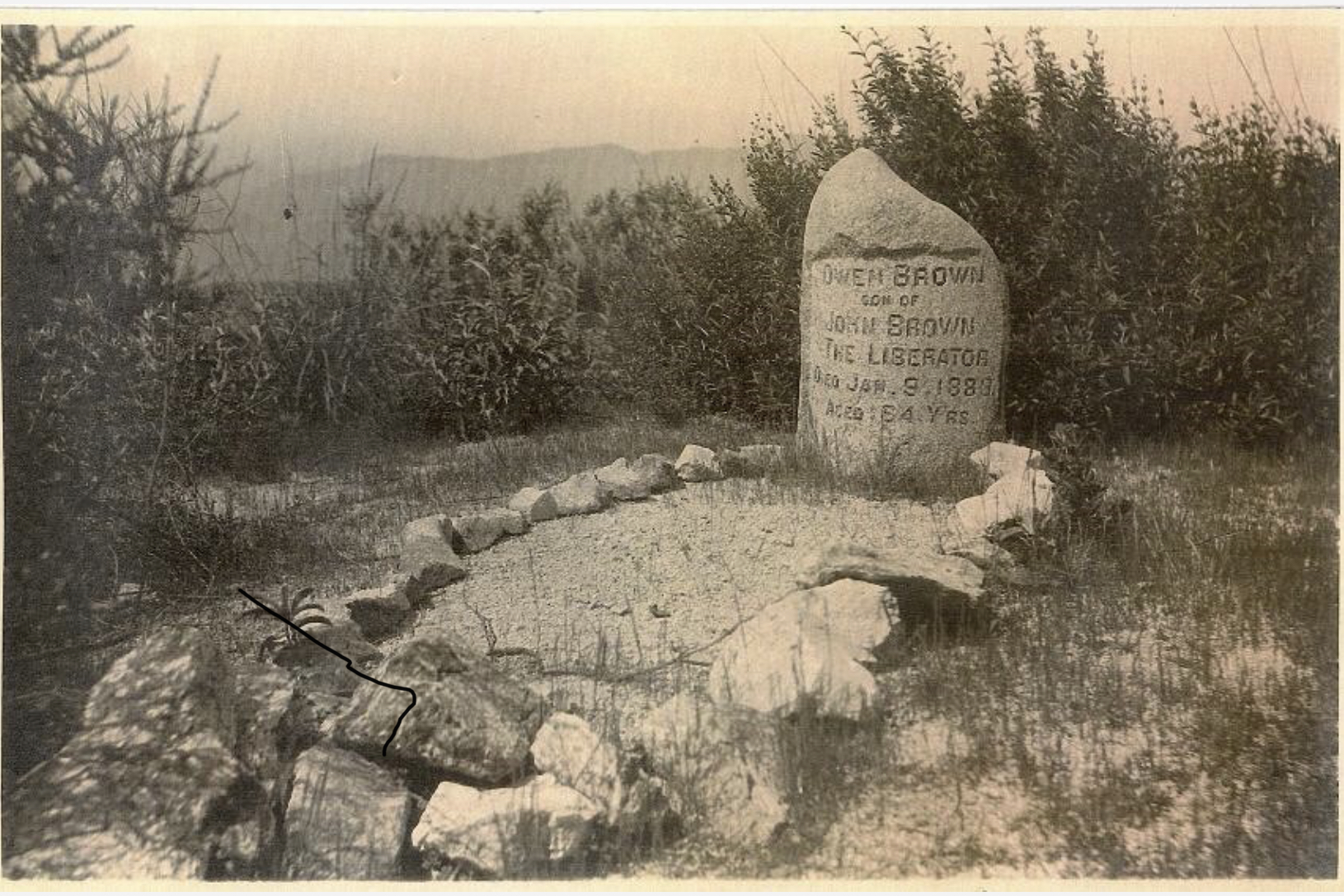
Brown's grave, early 20th century

== In popular culture ==
He is the narrator, an old man living in California in 1909 (50 years later), in Russell Banks' novel about John Brown, Cloudsplitter. In this novel he accompanies his father on his trip to England of 1848, and a pregnant unmarried woman, who commits suicide by jumping overboard, is the mysterious lady he loved. This is fiction.

Owen Brown is a supporting character in Ann Rinaldi’s novel Mine Eyes Have Seen. The book is from the perspective of Owen’s sister, Annie Brown.

Actor Jeffrey Hunter portrayed Owen in the 1955 film Seven Angry Men. The title refers to John Brown and his six grown sons, focusing mostly on the moral debate between Owen and his father.

He is portrayed by actor Beau Knapp in the 2020 Showtime limited series The Good Lord Bird, based on the 2013 novel of the same name by James McBride.

== Writings by Owen Brown ==
- Letter to his mother, August 27, 1856.
- "Letter to the editor, with corrections to his interview in The Atlantic", The Atlantic, p. 101, July 1874
- Statement about Harpers Ferry, May 5, 1885.
- "Owen Brown's Account of the Fight at Black Jack, Kan. A Striking Episode of Border History in 1856, Now First Printed as Owen Brown Told It". Springfield Republican. Springfield, Massachusetts. January 14, 1889.
- Brown's Account of Leaving Kansas in 1856, Unpublished. Boyd B. Stutler Collection, West Virginia Archives, Ms. 78–1, April 26, 1888

== Media ==
- SoCal Outdoor Explorer (June 27, 2020), Hike to Owen Brown's grave, located in Altadena California, archived from the original on December 20, 2021
- Ayers, Paul (January 4, 2021) [July 22, 2017], Owen Brown—Altadena's first celebrity, archived from the original on December 20, 2021
- Burton, John (August 29, 2021), Restoration of Owen Brown gravesite, July-August, 2021, PowerPoint presentation, Save the Altadena Trails; Owen Brown Gravesite Committee, County of Los Angeles, archived from the original on December 20, 2021
- Conversations with Ralph Walker, Ralph Walker talks to historian Michele Zack, and public space advocate Marietta Kruells, about the efforts to restore Owen Brown's gravestone, KGEM-TV, September 10, 2021, archived from the original on December 20, 2021

== Archival material ==
Some letters of Brown are held at the Oregon Historical Society Research Library, Portland, Oregon.

== See also ==
- John Brown's raiders

== Further reading (most recent first) ==
- Thomas, Rick (June 7, 2018). "Brown Boys Were Local Heroes". South Pasadenan.
- Ehrenreich, Ben (June 4, 2013). "Dead Reckoning. In search of Owen Brown, the antislavery abolitionist buried in the hills of Altadena". Los Angeles Magazine.
- Chapin, Lou V. (July 18, 1897). "'His Soul Is Marching On'. The Prologue to the Drama of the Civil War". Los Angeles Times. p. 17 – via newspapers.com.
- Thorndale, Theresa (1898). "Owen Brown". Sketches and Stories of the Lake Erie Islands. Sandusky, Ohio. pp. 168–173. ISBN 9780665284946. Revised version of a piece first published in the Sandusky Daily Register, July 28, 1892, p. 3. The author was a resident of Put-in-Bay.
- "Owen Brown — Some Facts about the Son of the Great Liberator [obituary]". Los Angeles Times. January 16, 1889. p. 1 – via newspapers.com.
- Virginia 13th Judicial Circuit (1907–1908) [October 1859]. "Indictment of Owen Brown". Proceedings of the Massachusetts Historical Society. 3. 1 [Vol. 41 of continuous numbering]: 508–540. JSTOR 25079950.
