= Samples Manor, Maryland =

Unincorporated community in Maryland, U.S.

Coordinates: 39°22′19″N 77°43′12″W

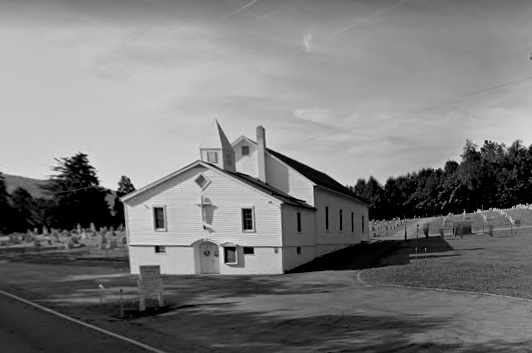
Sample's Manor Church of God on Harper's Ferry road

Samples Manor is an unincorporated community in Washington County, Maryland, United States. The Kennedy Farm was listed on the National Register of Historic Places in 1973.

== History ==
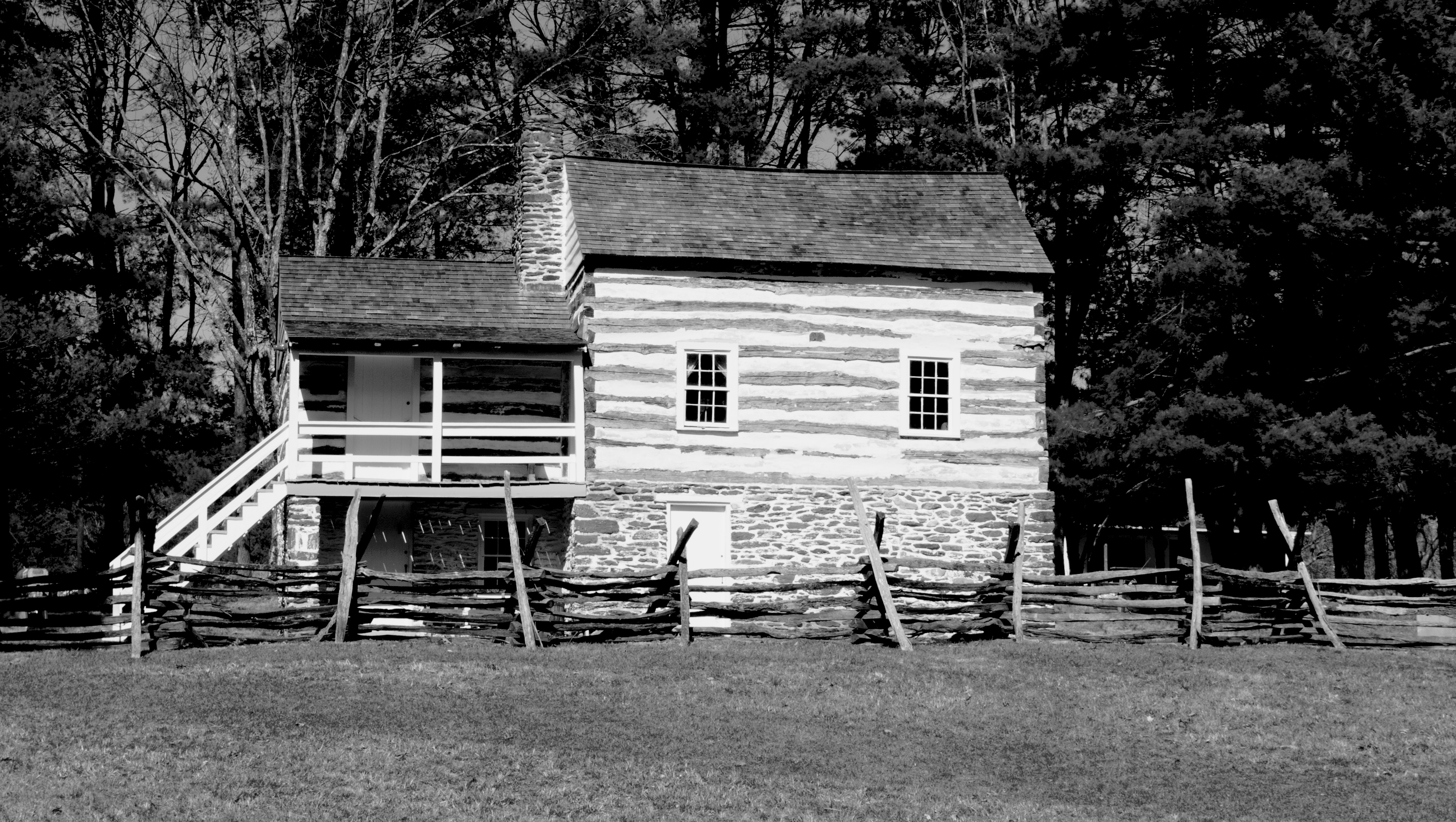
Restored Kennedy Farmhouse in 2018

On October 1, 1764, a patent was approved for 10,160 ¼ acres in extreme southern Washington County, (then Frederick County) Maryland for a prominent businessman named John Semple of Charles County. Such large properties were categorized as manors in colonial Maryland, with their own unique laws. The tract was named Keep Treist by Semple, but took on the popular name of Semple's Manor, which became “Sample’s Manor.” John Semple was an innovator in colonial America with a unique vision and goals. He was not attentive to his financial affairs, however, and within a decade of acquiring Keep Treist, John Semple was bankrupt. Most of Keep Treist was acquired by the Frederick Forge, later becoming the Antietam Iron Works. By the mid-19th century much of the forest had been harvested and converted to charcoal to fuel the iron works. The cleared land was then sold for farms and lots. These land sales increased after the unexpected death of Iron Works owner John Brein in 1849. The most famous resident of Sample's Manor would only live there for four months in 1859 at the nearby Kennedy Farm. The abolitionist John Brown and his cadre of followers would make history on October 16, 1859, with their raid on the U.S. Armory, three miles away at Harper's Ferry. The Sample's Manor Church of God is thought to have originated circa 1850. The cemetery holds generations of ancestors, many of whom still live nearby today. Sample's Manor and the Kennedy Farm were the unlikely sites of a major development plan by prominent African Americans in the 1960s. "John Brown's Farm" included performances by dozens of the top R&B musicians of the late 20th century.

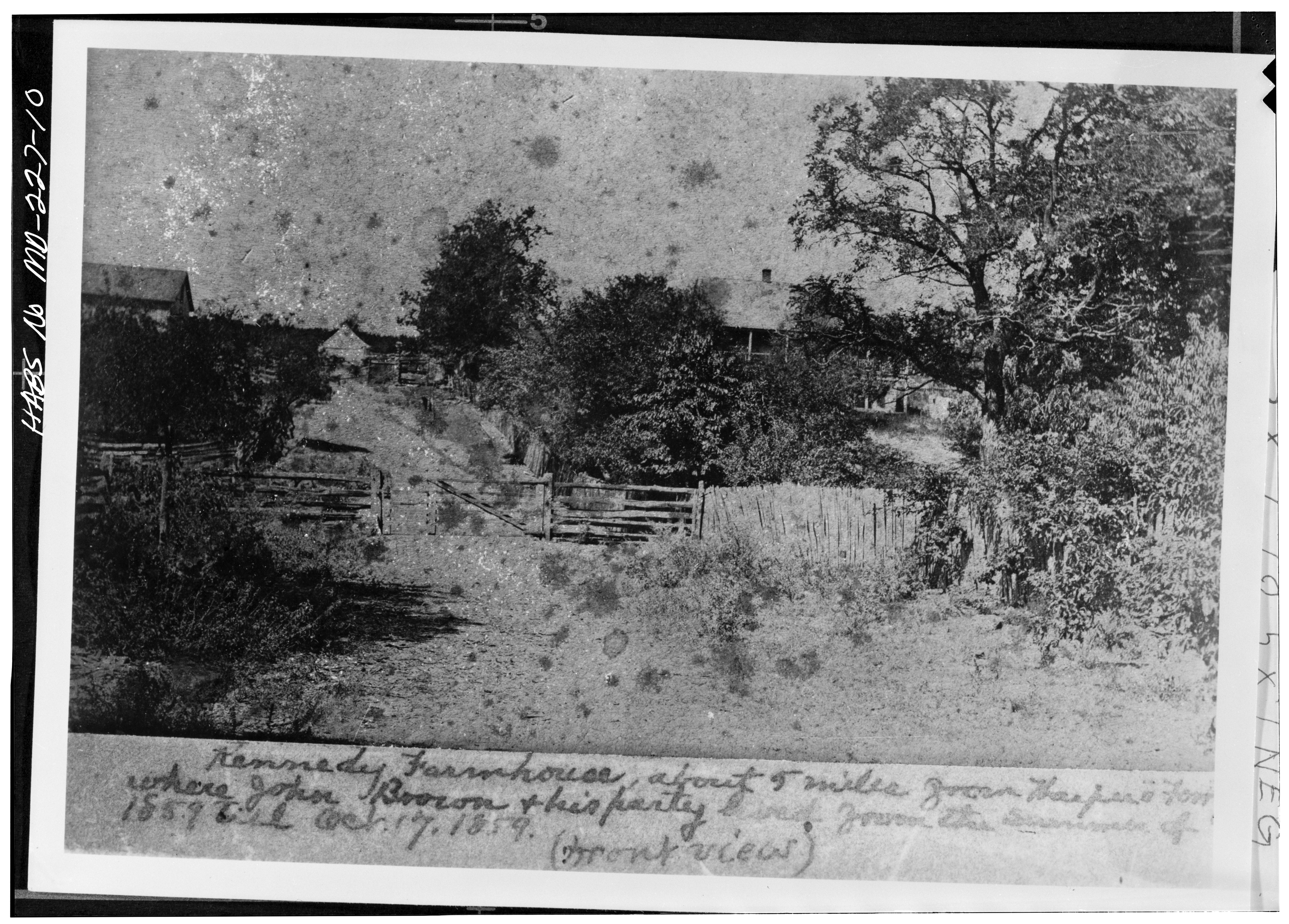
Historical view of the Kennedy Farm from Chestnut Grove road.
