= John Hunt Painter =

American Quaker farmer (1819–1891)

- Born: September 3, 1819; Salem, Ohio, US
- Died: April 9, 1891 (aged 71); Pasadena, California, US
- Occupations: Farmer; Justice of the Peace; Real estate developer Hotel owner
- Spouse: Edith Dean

John Hunt Painter (September 3, 1819 – April 9, 1891) was a Quaker farmer living near Springdale, Iowa, who sent the firearms to abolitionist John Brown that were used during Brown's historic raid on Harpers Ferry in 1859. Originally from Salem, Ohio, in 1849, John Hunt Painter moved to his farm near Springdale, a small Quaker community in Cedar County, Iowa.

Painter was an early settler of Pasadena, California, where, in 1888, he erected the La Pintoresca ("The Picturesque") hotel, a local landmark. In 1889 he was a pallbearer at the Pasadena funeral of Owen Brown, whom he knew from Iowa.

Painter died in 1891 and is buried Mountain View Cemetery in Altadena. Streets in both Pasadena and Whittier, California are named for Painter.
