= Gibraltar Island =

Island in the United States of America

Nickname: Gem of Lake Erie
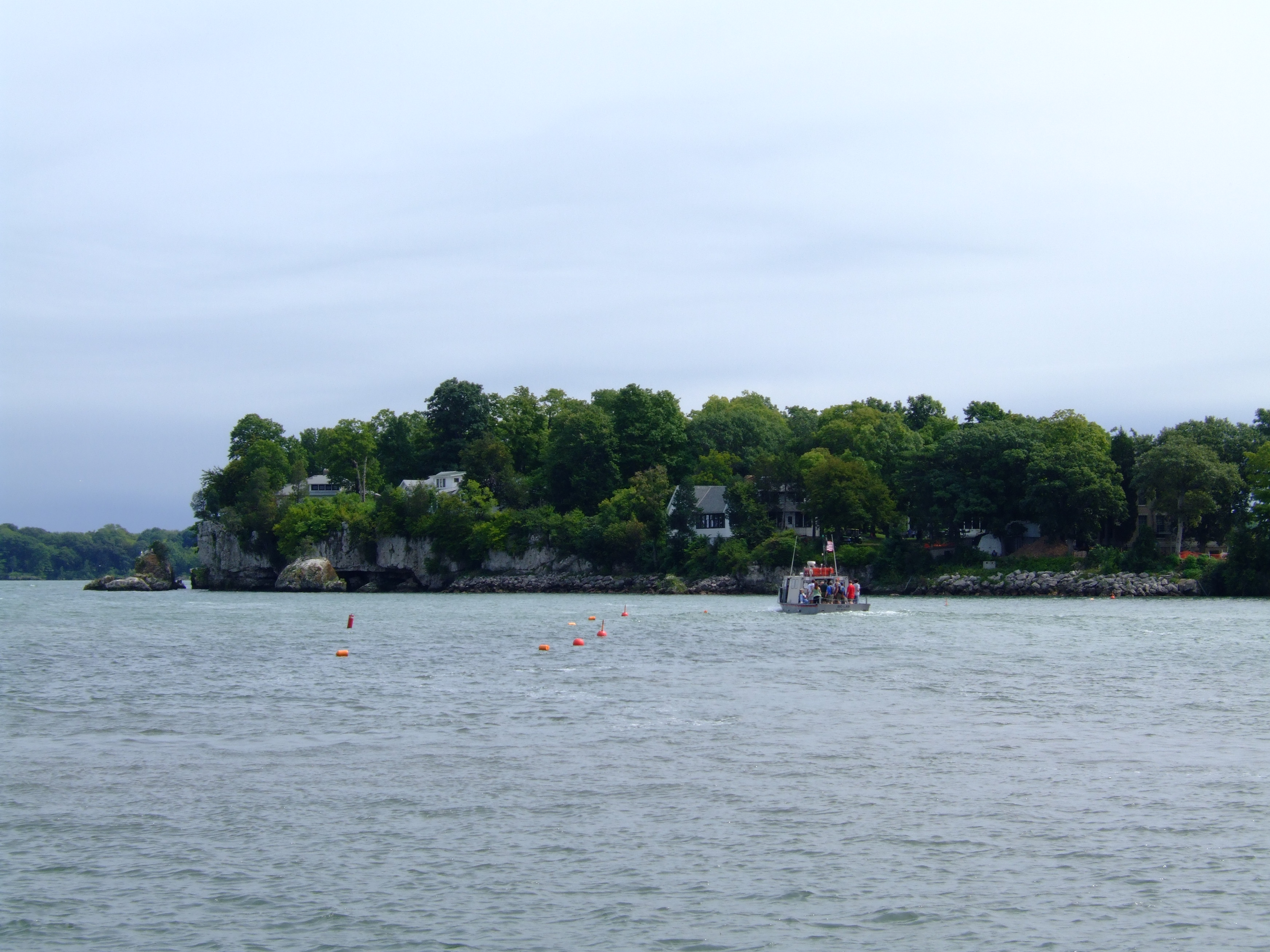
- View of the island from South Bass Island, Ohio

- Location within Ohio

Geography
- Location: Lake Erie
- Coordinates: 41.6582°N 82.8206°W
- Area: 6.55 acres (2.65 ha)

Administration
- United States

Gibraltar Island (or the "Gem of Lake Erie") is an island in Ohio, located within Lake Erie. This small 6.55-acre (2.6 ha) island is just offshore of South Bass Island. It is part of Put-in-Bay Township, Ottawa County, Ohio.

The rocky island is named for its resemblance to the Rock of Gibraltar.

== History ==
Gibraltar Island became a lookout point for Commodore Oliver Hazard Perry in the fight against the British during the War of 1812. Perry and his men defeated a fleet of British sailing vessels during the famous Battle of Lake Erie on September 10, 1813. As a result, the lookout point on Gibraltar Island became known as Perry's Lookout.

Ownership of the island remained with Connecticut until Pierpont Edwards, a New York City banker, purchased the deed in 1807. Sandusky, Ohio native Jay Cooke bought the island from Edwards in 1864 and immediately began construction of a 15-room Victorian-Gothic mansion (now known as Cooke Castle). The Cooke family entertained a variety of notables, such as William Tecumseh Sherman, Salmon P. Chase, Rutherford B. Hayes, Grover Cleveland, and Benjamin Harrison. John Brown's son Owen, whose brother John Jr. lived on neighboring South Bass Island (Put-in-Bay), was caretaker during the winter and when the Cookes were away. In the early 1880s Cooke's daughter, Laura Barney, sold it to Julius Stone, who eventually gave it to the Ohio State University.

== Stone Laboratory ==
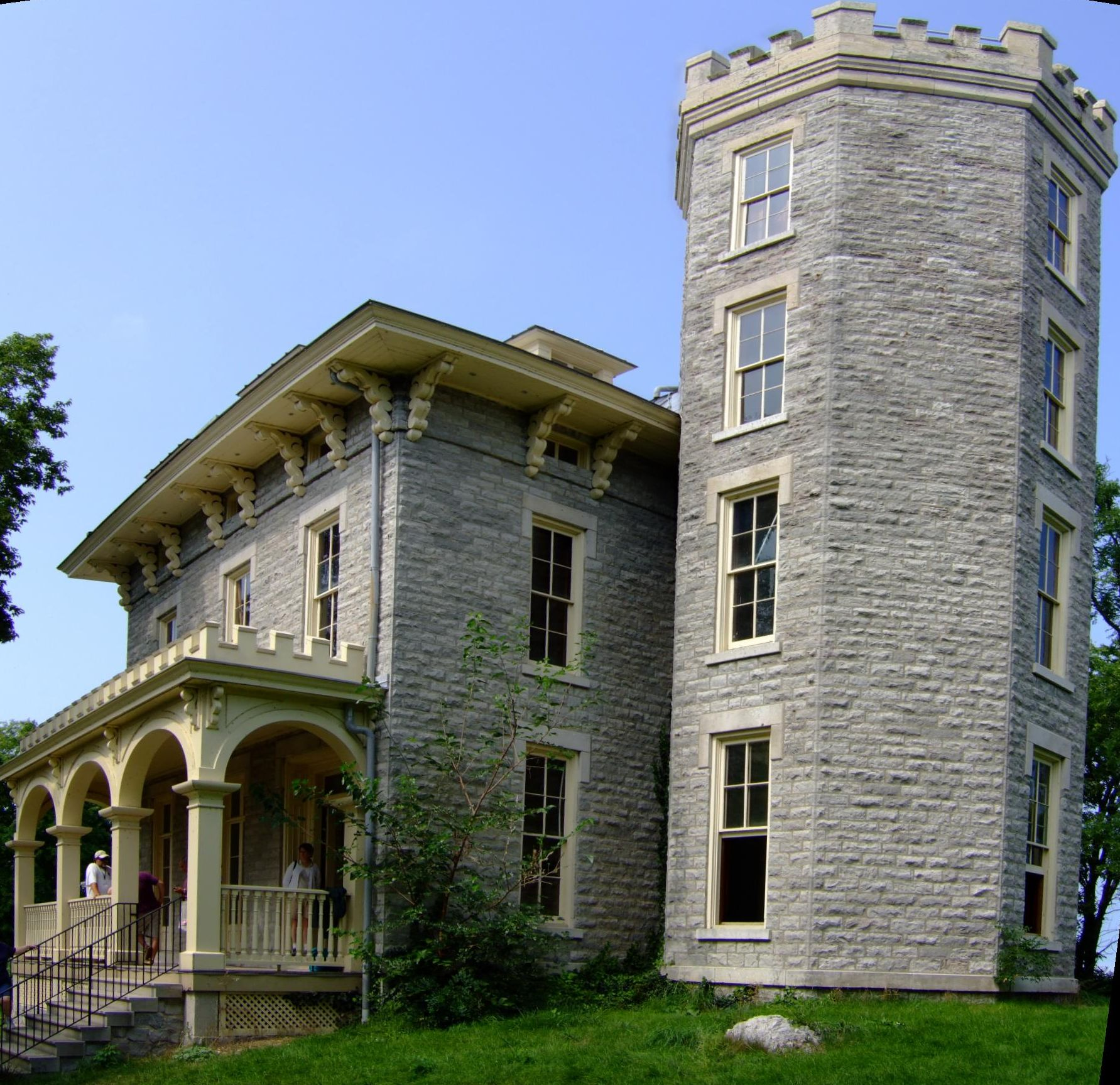
Cooke Castle

Ohio State University has had various research and teaching laboratories on Lake Erie since 1895, when Professor David S. Kellicott created a second-floor lab in a Sandusky, Ohio fish hatchery. Kellicott served as the laboratory director until his death in 1898. The first courses were offered to students in 1900. The lab moved to Cedar Point and South Bass Island before settling on Gibraltar Island in Put-in-Bay. Julius Stone, a trustee of the Ohio State University, acquired the deed in 1925 from descendants of Jay Cooke. He immediately offered the land to Ohio State. The Board of Trustees resolved that it would be named for his father, Franz Theodore Stone, a Prussian mathematician and astronomical researcher who worked for Friedrich Wilhelm Bessel after attending the Königsberg Albertina University. Though the purchase was made in 1925, the first classes did not begin until 1929, and the F. T. Stone Laboratory (known simply as Stone Lab) was dedicated on June 22, 1929, making it the oldest freshwater field station in the United States. It contains six classrooms, offices, laboratories, computing facilities, and a 100-seat auditorium. It hosts workshops for grade school students throughout the year, and full-credit college courses are offered to advanced high school students, undergraduates, and graduate students over the summer.

Other buildings on Gibraltar include:

- Cooke Castle, built in 1865 by Jay Cooke, currently being renovated, listed on National Register of Historic Places
- Barney Cottage, built in approximately 1900 by Jay Cooke's daughter, sleeps 22
- Dining Hall, built in 1929 by Ohio State
- Stone Cottage, built in 1930 by Ohio State as quarters for instructors and researchers, sleeps 10
- Gibraltar House, built in 1930 by Ohio State as quarters for the caretaker
- Harborview House, built in 1985 by Ohio State as a dormitory, sleeps 60
