= Springdale, Iowa =

- Unincorporated community
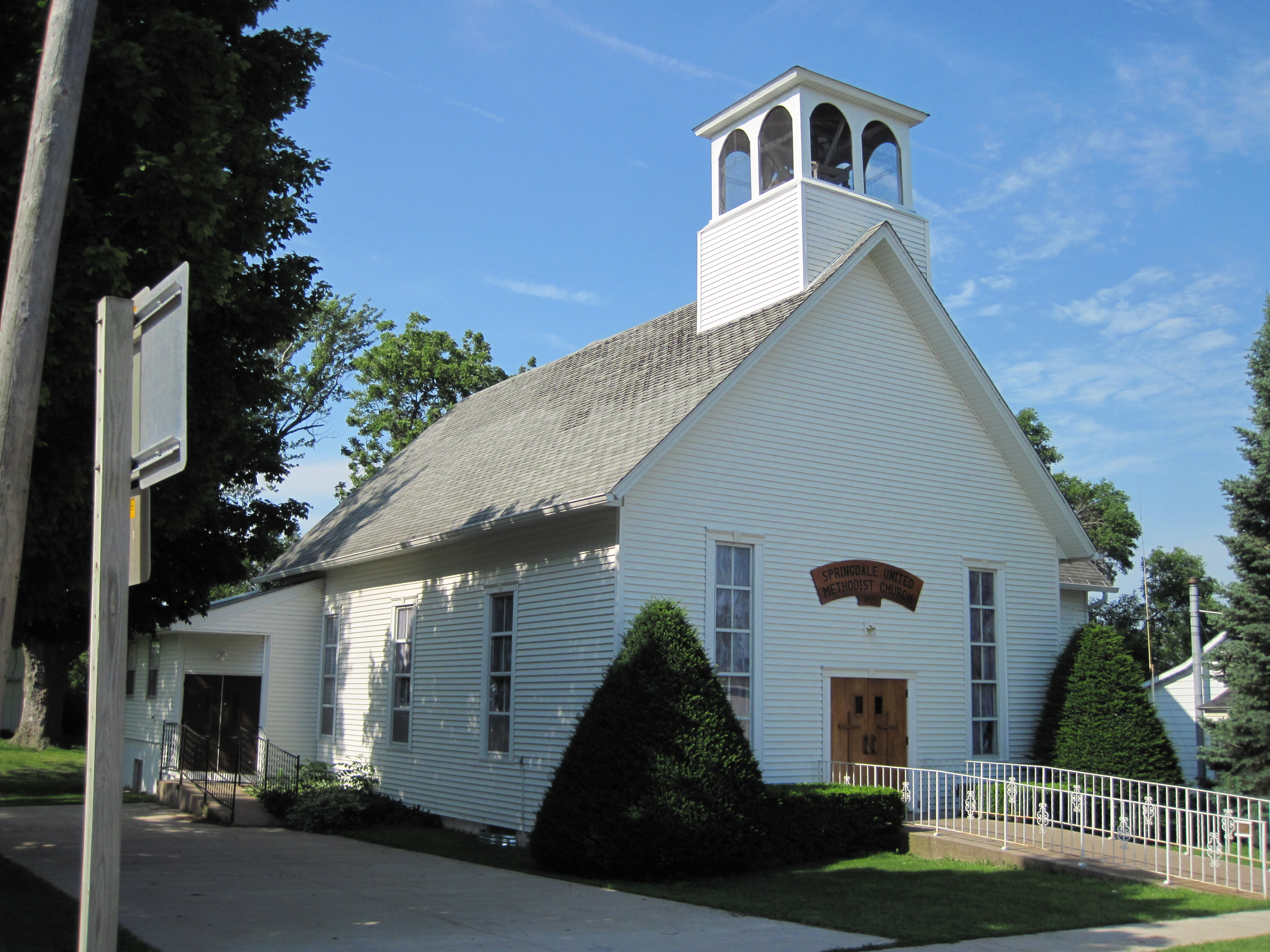
- Springdale's Methodist Church on 290th Street

- Location within Iowa
- Coordinates: 41°40′14″N 91°15′33″W
- Country: United States
- State: Iowa
- County: Cedar
- Elevation: 781 ft (238 m)
- Time zone: UTC-6 (Central (CST))
  - Summer (DST): UTC-5 (CDT)
- Area code: 319
- GNIS feature ID: 461914

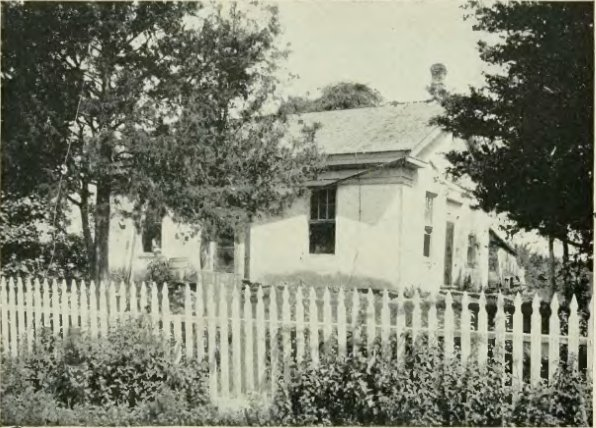
William Maxson's house, ca. 1903, where abolitionist John Brown's accomplices lived and trained, 1857–1859.

Springdale is a small unincorporated community in Cedar County, Iowa, United States. Historically, the town was predominantly settled by Quakers, and was one of Iowa's most important stations on the Underground Railroad.

== History ==
Starting in 1857, Springdale was the western base of operations for the militant abolitionist John Brown, who lived in John Hunt Painter's house while training the 10 men who came with him in preparation for his raid on Harpers Ferry, Virginia. The 10 were his son Owen Brown, John Kagi, Aaron D. Stevens, John E. Cook, Richard Realf, Charles W. Moffitt, Luke J. Parsons, Charles H. Tidd, William Leeman, and Richard Richardson. In 1858 they departed east. In February 1859, Brown appeared with 12 enslaved men and women from Missouri.

In July, 1859, two local boys, Edwin and Barclay Coppoc, joined Brown in his raid. The first was captured, tried, and executed; Barclay escaped and died later serving in the Union army.

Springdale was also the home of Lawrie Tatum, a farmer who served as a frontier Indian agent and the legal guardian of future President Herbert Hoover. The main street through the town is the Herbert Hoover Highway.

The population was 81 in 1940.

No downtown business district remains in Springdale; it is a cluster of houses with a United Methodist church. William Maxson's home, where Brown's men were quartered, was razed in 1938, but its location is marked by a plaque provided by the Daughters of the American Revolution. Although often described as Quaker, Maxson was raised in the faith but at the time of Brown's visit considered himself a follower of spiritualism.

== Historic residents ==
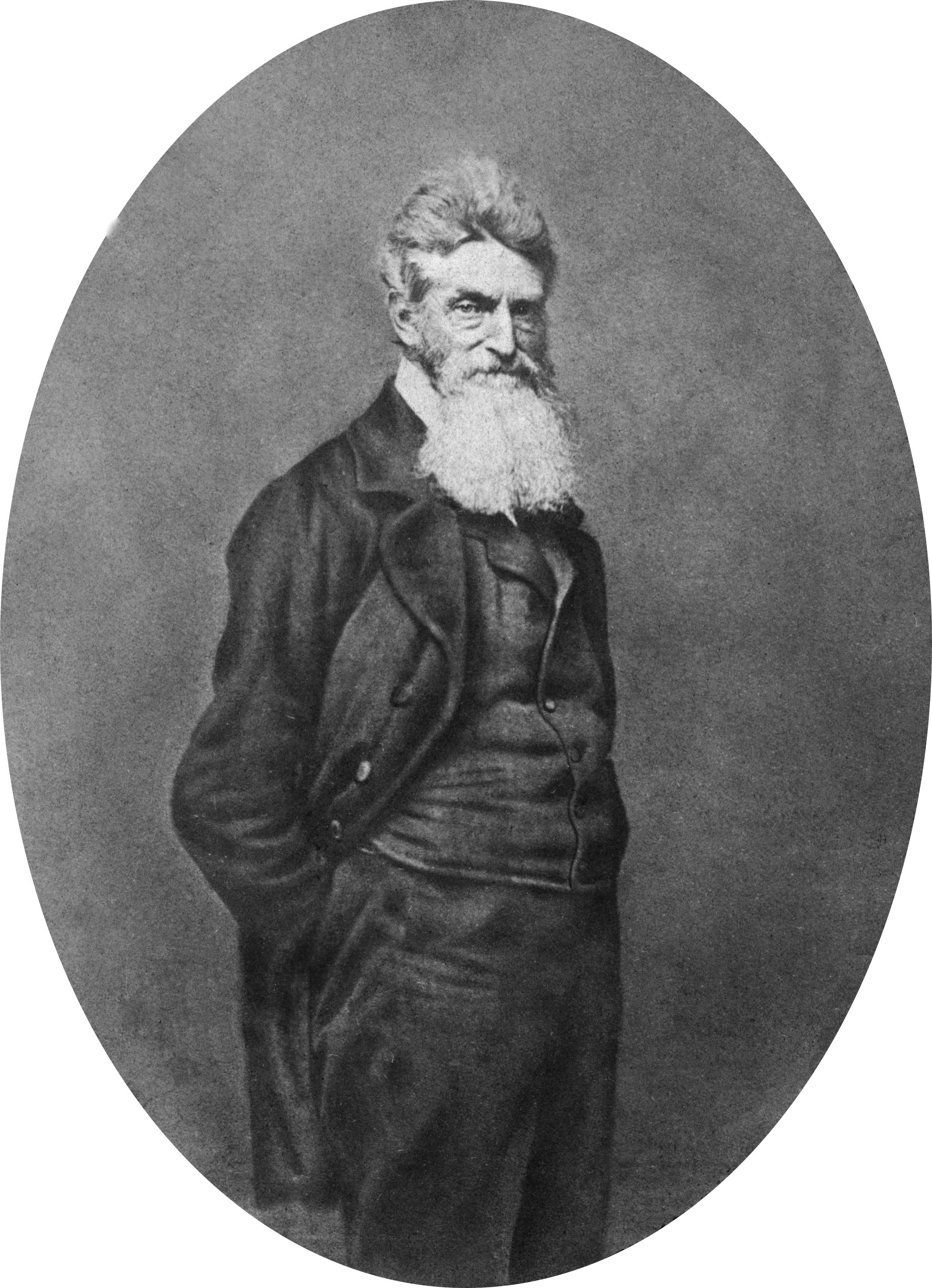
John Brown

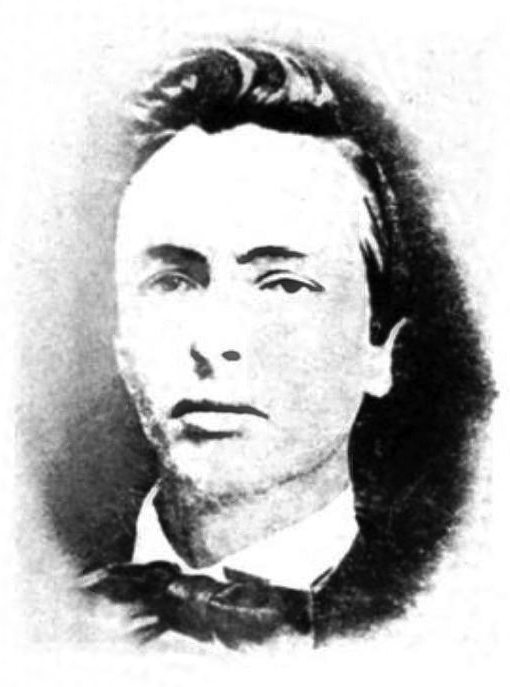
Barclay Coppoc

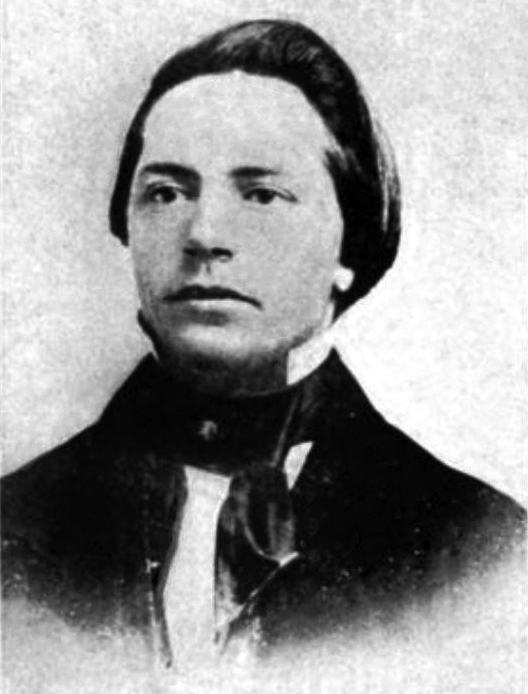
Edwin Coppoc

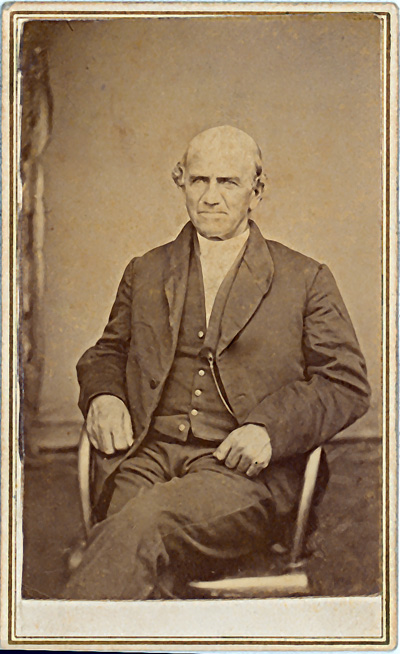
Lawrie Tatum
