= Kennedy Farmhouse =

Historic house in Maryland, United States

- Kennedy Farm
- U.S. National Register of Historic Places
- U.S. National Historic Landmark
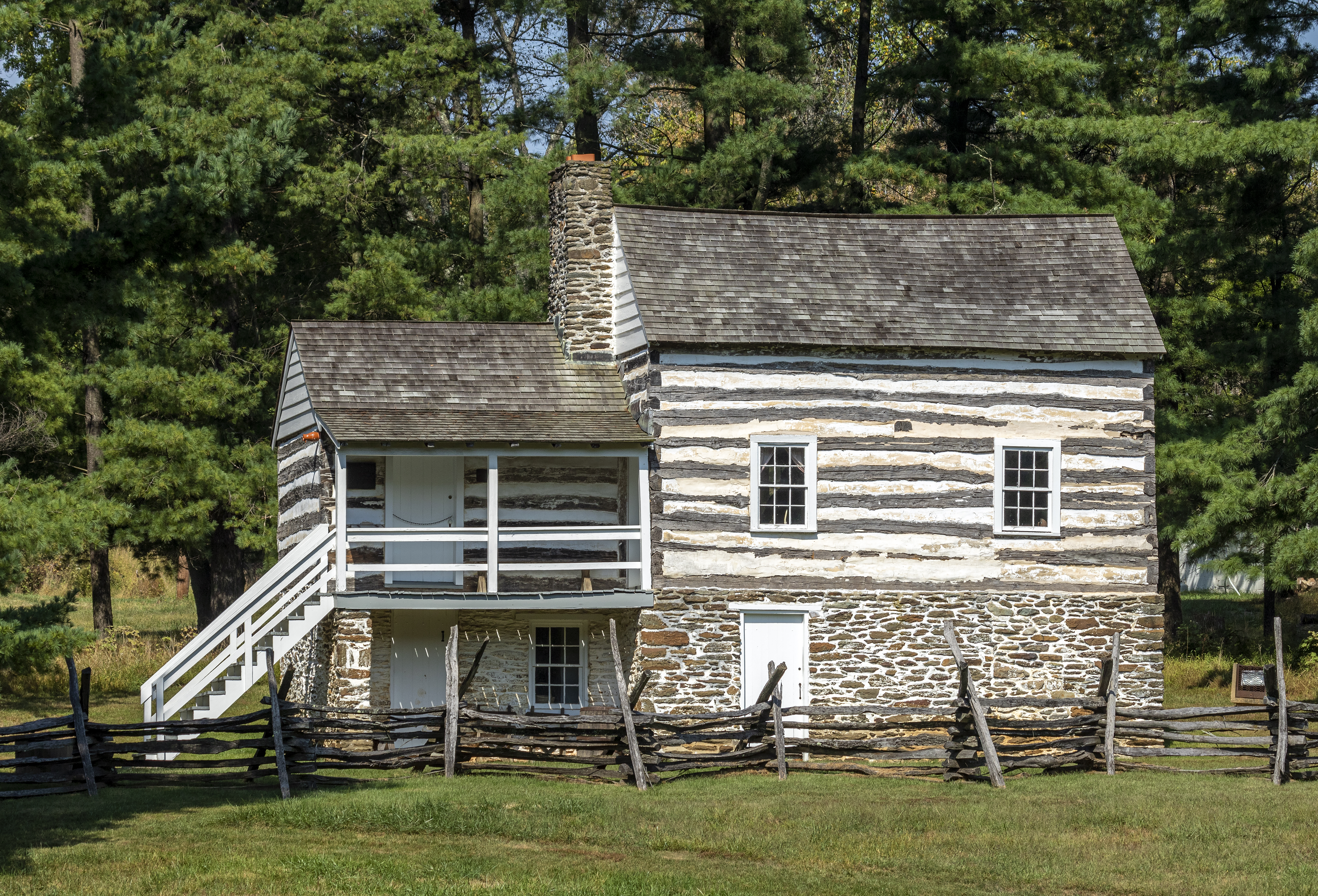
- The restored Kennedy Farm House in 2019

- Location within Maryland Location within the United States
- Location: Samples Manor, Maryland
- Coordinates: 39°22′47″N 77°42′56″W
- Area: 1.77 acres (0.72 ha)
- Built: c. 1800, 1852
- NRHP reference No.: 73000941

Significant dates
- Added to NRHP: November 7, 1973
- Designated NHL: November 7, 1973

The Kennedy Farm is a National Historic Landmark property on Chestnut Grove Road in rural southern Washington County, Maryland. It is notable as the place where the radical abolitionist John Brown planned and began his raid on Harpers Ferry, Virginia (today West Virginia), in 1859. Also known as the John Brown Raid Headquarters and Kennedy Farmhouse, the log, stone, and brick building has been restored to its appearance at the time of the raid. The farm is now owned by a preservation nonprofit.

== Historic significance ==
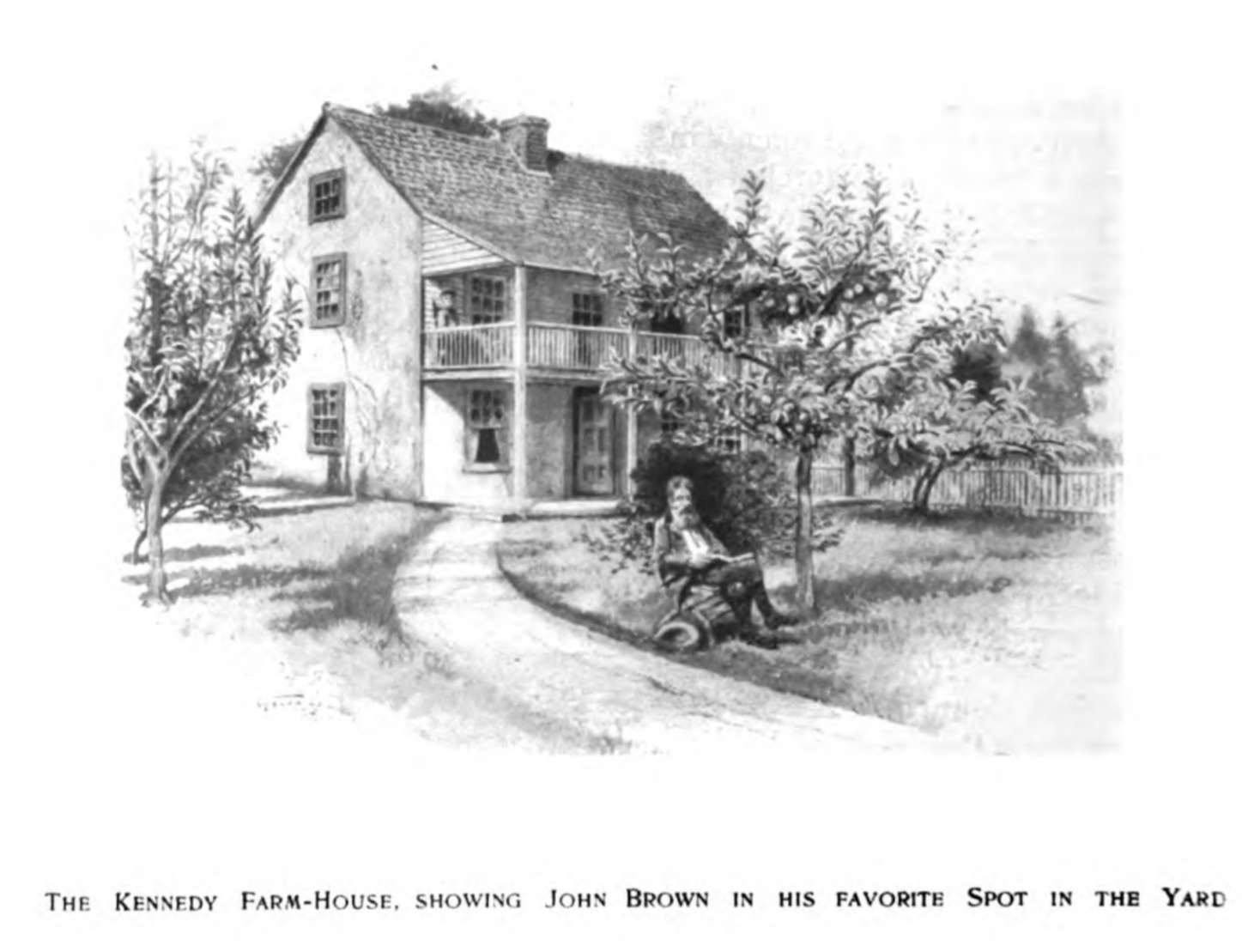
The Kennedy Farmhouse, sketch published in 1902. John Brown in the chair in the yard.

The Kennedy Farm is a parcel of under 2 acres (0.81 ha) of land on the west side of Chestnut Grove Road, a few miles north of Harpers Ferry, West Virginia, in a rural part of southern Washington County, Maryland. It is part of a much larger farm property that was purchased in 1852 by Dr. Robert Kennedy. Kennedy took the small log cabin on the property, and mounted it on a tall (one-story in height) stone foundation, added a frame addition to one side, and covered both with a gabled roof. Kennedy died in 1858.

John Brown arrived in Maryland in 1859 and rented the house. For three months Brown and his co-conspirators lived here, pretending to be exploring mining opportunities. Supporters arrived, weapons arrived, and they planned an attack on the federal armory at Harpers Ferry in a bid to incite a slave rebellion.

Conditions at the Kennedy farmhouse, described as "flea-infested", were spartan. The men slept upstairs on the floor. Brown's daughter Anne and Martha, Oliver's wife, who were there doing cooking and serving as look-outs, until Brown sent them home to New York on September 30, slept on crudely stuffed mattresses. The wooden crates with weapons were covered and used for seats. Brown had to buy a stove in Harpers Ferry, as Anne failed at cooking potatoes in the fireplace.

On the day of the raid, October 16, 1859, 19 of the 22 at the farm left to carry out the raid. Three remained at the farmhouse to guard and manage the weapons: Owen Brown, Barclay Coppock, and Francis Jackson Meriam, When it became clear the raid was failing, all three escaped to the north, Owen to his brother John Jr.'s house in northeastern Ohio.

The farmhouse was searched immediately, and a trove of John's correspondence and many copies of his provisional constitution were found. These were much reported on in the press and played an important role in trying to find who Brown's financial supporters were.

Except for the engine house at the arsenal, which the raiders held for less than a day, the Kennedy Farm is the location most associated with John Brown's raid. It has been added to the National Register of Historic Places.

== Post-raid history ==
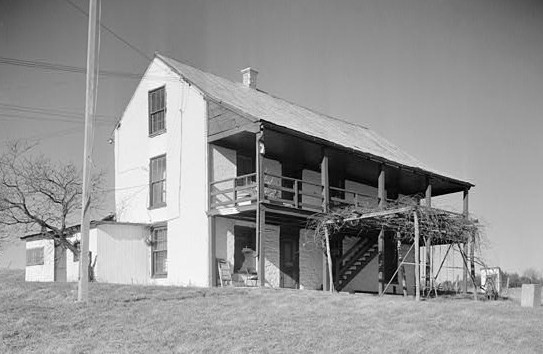
The Kennedy Farm House as it appeared in 1965

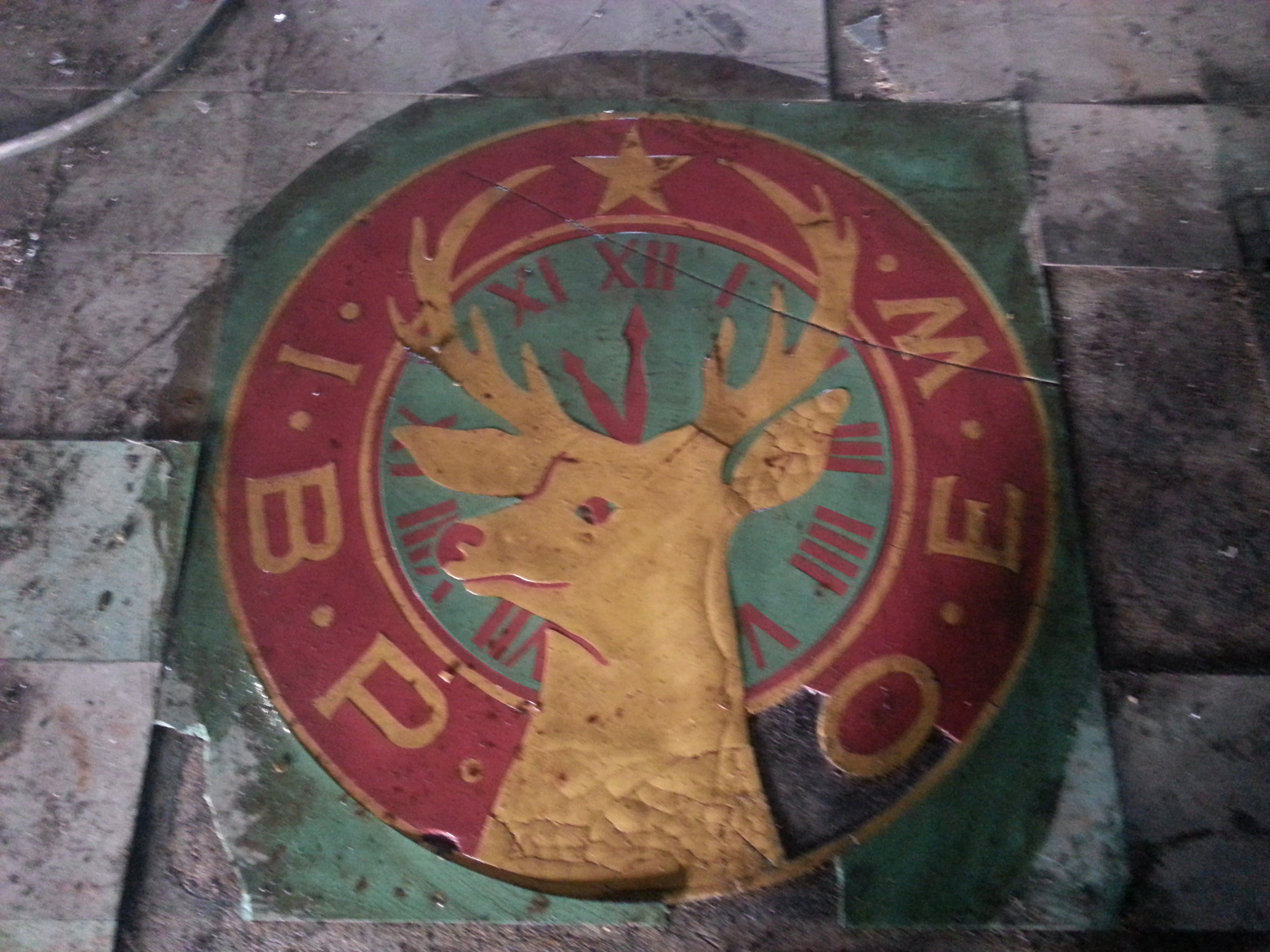
Black Elk's logo, once a prominent feature of the old dancehall floor.

The house underwent a number of ownership changes, and significant alterations, over the next 100+ years. In 1950, the IBPOEW (Black Elks) purchased the property as a memorial to John Brown and operated it as their National Shrine. During the years leading up to their selling of the property in 1966, the Elks built several buildings on the then-235-acre (95 ha) property, including a 50-foot (15 m) by 124-foot (38 m) auditorium that was used as a meeting place for Elks gatherings of up to three thousand persons on Fourth of July and Labor Day weekends.

The auditorium was rented on summer weekends by a local black entrepreneur, John Bishop, who booked into that venue dozens of the biggest stars of rhythm and blues on the Chitlin' Circuit, including Ray Charles, Aretha Franklin, James Brown, Marvin Gaye, Little Richard, Chuck Berry, B. B. King, Eartha Kitt, Otis Redding, Etta James, The Coasters, and The Drifters.

When it was designated a National Historic Landmark in 1974, it was described as a 2 1/2-story house that used stone, brick and log construction with a stucco overlay. It had four bays, with a double-tiered porch running outside three rooms on the first and second floors. There were two rooms in the attic, and a small shed addition to the rear. An interior stair links the central rooms inside, and an exterior stair links the porch's two levels.

The house then underwent a major restoration effort, funded by public and private sources, to return it to its 1850s appearance.

== See also ==
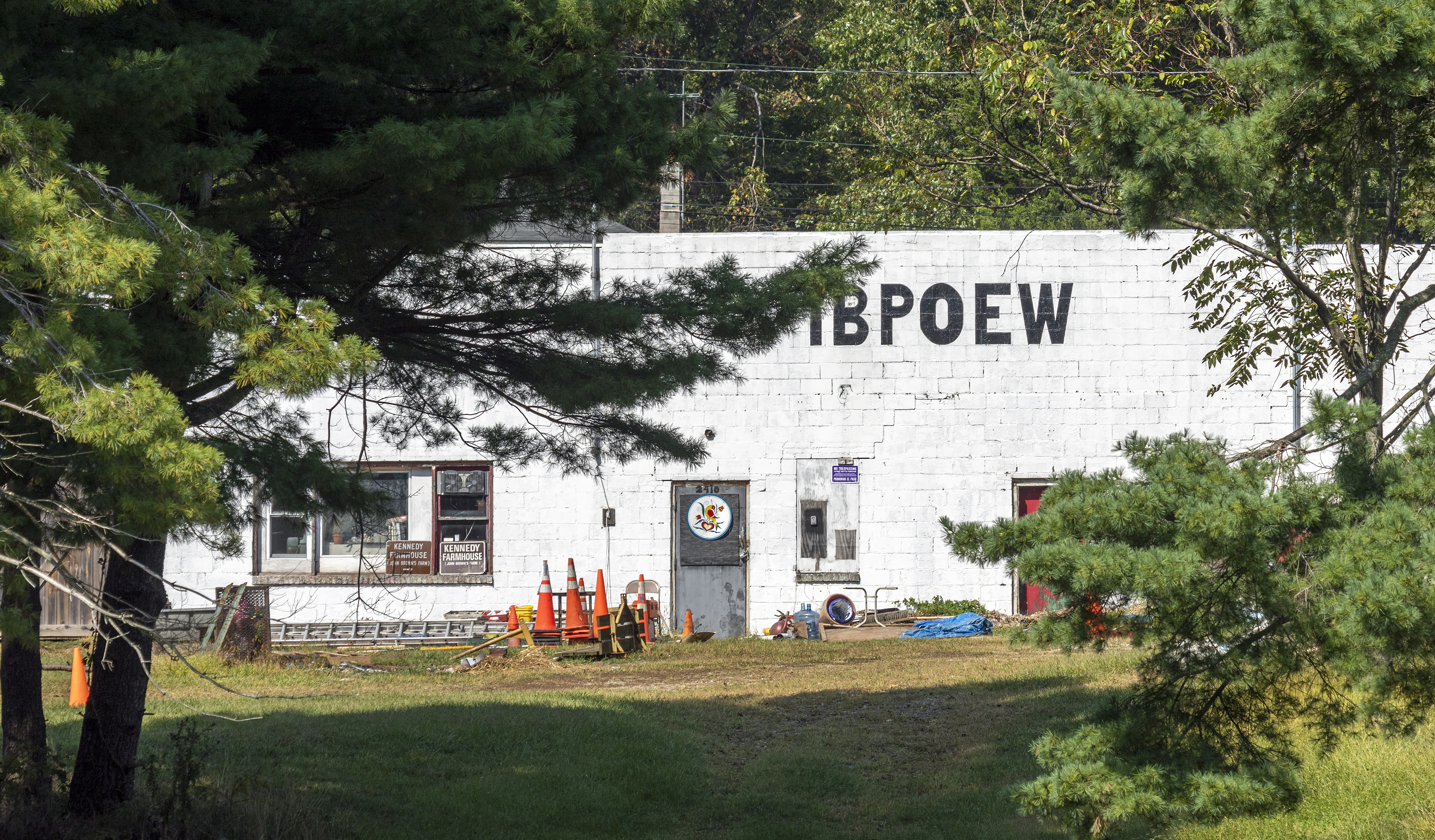
The IBPOEW meeting hall

- List of National Historic Landmarks in Maryland
- National Register of Historic Places listings in Washington County, Maryland
