= Jay Cooke House =

Historic house in Ohio, United States

- Jay Cooke Home
- U.S. National Register of Historic Places
- U.S. National Historic Landmark
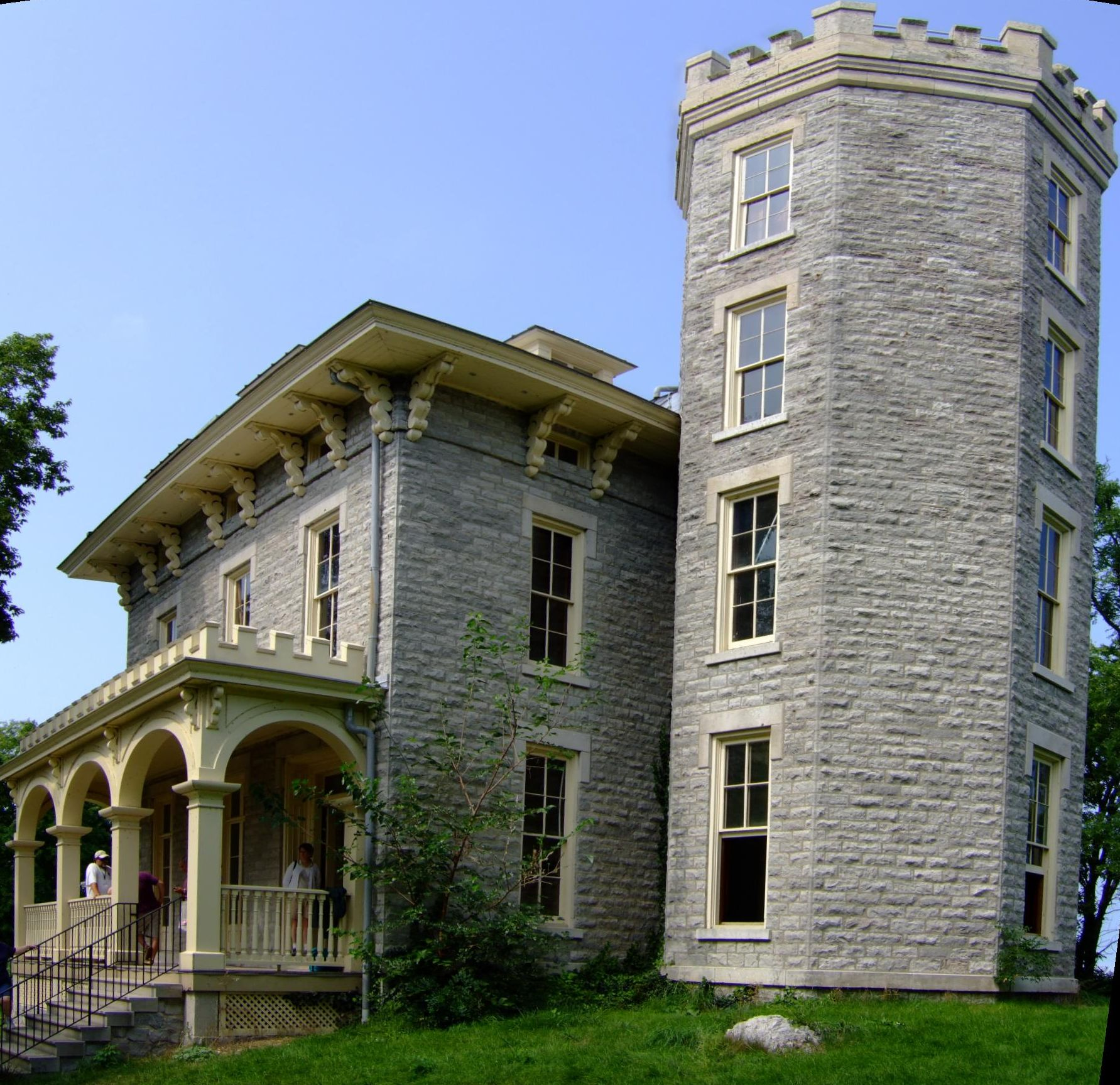

- Location within Ohio Location within the United States
- Location: Gibraltar Island, Put-in-Bay, Ohio
- Coordinates: 41°39′29″N 82°49′16″W
- Area: 8 acres (3.2 ha)
- Built: 1865
- Architectural style: Italianate
- NRHP reference No.: 66000620

Significant dates
- Added to NRHP: November 13, 1966
- Designated NHL: November 13, 1966

The Jay Cooke House (also known as Cooke Castle) is a historic summer estate house on Gibraltar Island, an island in the Lake Erie community of Put-in-Bay, Ohio, United States. Built in 1865, it was the summer house and a favorite place of financier Jay Cooke (1821–1905). Since 1925, the former Cooke estate has hosted the Stone Laboratory of Ohio State University, one of the nation's oldest freshwater field research stations. The estate, encompassing the entire 8-acre (3.2 ha) island, was declared a National Historic Landmark in 1966.

== Description and history ==
Gibraltar Island is a minor island associated with South Bass Island in southwestern Lake Erie, located inside the cove known as Put-in-Bay, where the village of Put-in-Bay is located. The 8-acre island is roughly lozenge-shaped, with an elongation at its southwestern end. Cooke Castle is located east of the geographic Island's center and is the easternmost building on the island. It is three stories tall, built of stone with wooden trim. Its most prominent feature is a four-story octagonal tower, topped with a Gothic Revival crenellated parapet. The single-story front porch is also topped by crenellations, with rounded-arch openings flanked by square columns. The interior features elaborate woodwork, with a fine marble fireplace in the parlor.

The island was purchased by Jay Cooke in 1865, and the house was built soon afterward. Cooke, a native of Sandusky, had played a pivotal role in financing the Union side's war effort in the American Civil War, selling nearly one billion dollars of war bonds to large and small buyers alike. He regularly spent time here after building the house, typically spending three weeks in the spring and again in late summer. He was forced to sell the island in 1874 after suffering bankruptcy during the Panic of 1873, but recovered some of his fortune and repurchased the property in 1880. The Ohio State University acquired the Island in 1925, establishing its freshwater research center there.

== See also ==
- National Register of Historic Places listings in Ottawa County, Ohio
- List of National Historic Landmarks in Ohio
