= Put-in-Bay High School =

Public high school in Put-In-Bay, Ohio, USA

Location
- 659 Catawba Avenue; Put-in-Bay, Ohio 43456
- Coordinates: 41.650577°N 82.820977°W

Information
- Type: Public
- School district: Put-in-Bay Schools
- Principal: Scott Mangas
- Teaching staff: 2.00 (FTE)
- Grades: 7–12
- Enrollment: 27 (2023–2024)
- Student to teacher ratio: 13.50
- Colors: Blue and White
- Mascot: Panther
- Website: putinbayschools.com/high-school/

Put-In-Bay High School is a public high school on South Bass Island in Put-In-Bay, Ohio. It is the only high school in the Put-In-Bay Schools district. There are around thirty students enrolled at any given time, and they make up the pride of the Put-in-Bay Panthers. With only two Seniors in the Class of 2022, it is one of the smallest public high schools in Ohio.

The school fields a co-ed basketball team every year that plays a mostly-junior varsity schedule against a variety of schools in Northwest Ohio. Besides basketball, the school offers other seasonal sports such as volleyball, cross-country, archery, and sailing. All sports are offered to children in grades 7–12.

Though the number of students is small, there is no shortage of extracurriculars offered. The school hosts an Environmental Club, a Computer Club, and a Robotics team, as well as a Student Council.

Aside from South Bass Island, Put-In-Bay Local School District also covers the Lake Erie Islands of Buckeye Island, Gibraltar Island, Green Island, Mouse Island, Rattlesnake Island, and Starve Island, even though most of these islands are uninhabited.

== Notable alumni ==
- Jim Ladd (American football), former professional NFL player
