= Staten Island Express Post =

- Industry: local post
- Founded: 1849 in Stapleton, Staten Island, US
- Founder: Francis Hagadorn and Company
- Area served: Staten Island
- Parent: Francis Hagadorn and Company

The Staten Island Express Post was a private local postal service that operated in Staten Island, New York. It was established by Francis Hagadorn and Company in 1849, due to dissatisfaction with the federal government's mail service.

The service had an office in Stapleton, on the more populous North Shore of the island, not far from the ferries to Manhattan. It provided mail boxes at various locations that sold the Staten Islander newspaper, which was published by Hagadorn. Post riders would collect the mail and deliver it to addressees on the island, or to connecting local posts such as Boyd's City Dispatch Post or Adams and Wells expresses, for delivery in New York City.

Two vermilion typographed prepaid postage stamps were issued by the service in 1849, in denominations of 3 cents and 6 cents. A collection of envelopes that were carried by the service between 1850 and 1860 was donated to the Staten Island Institute of Arts and Sciences sometime before 1949. It is unclear exactly when the Staten Island Express Post ceased operation, but most independent local posts were put out of business by an act of Congress in 1861.
