= Put-in-Bay, Ohio =

- Village
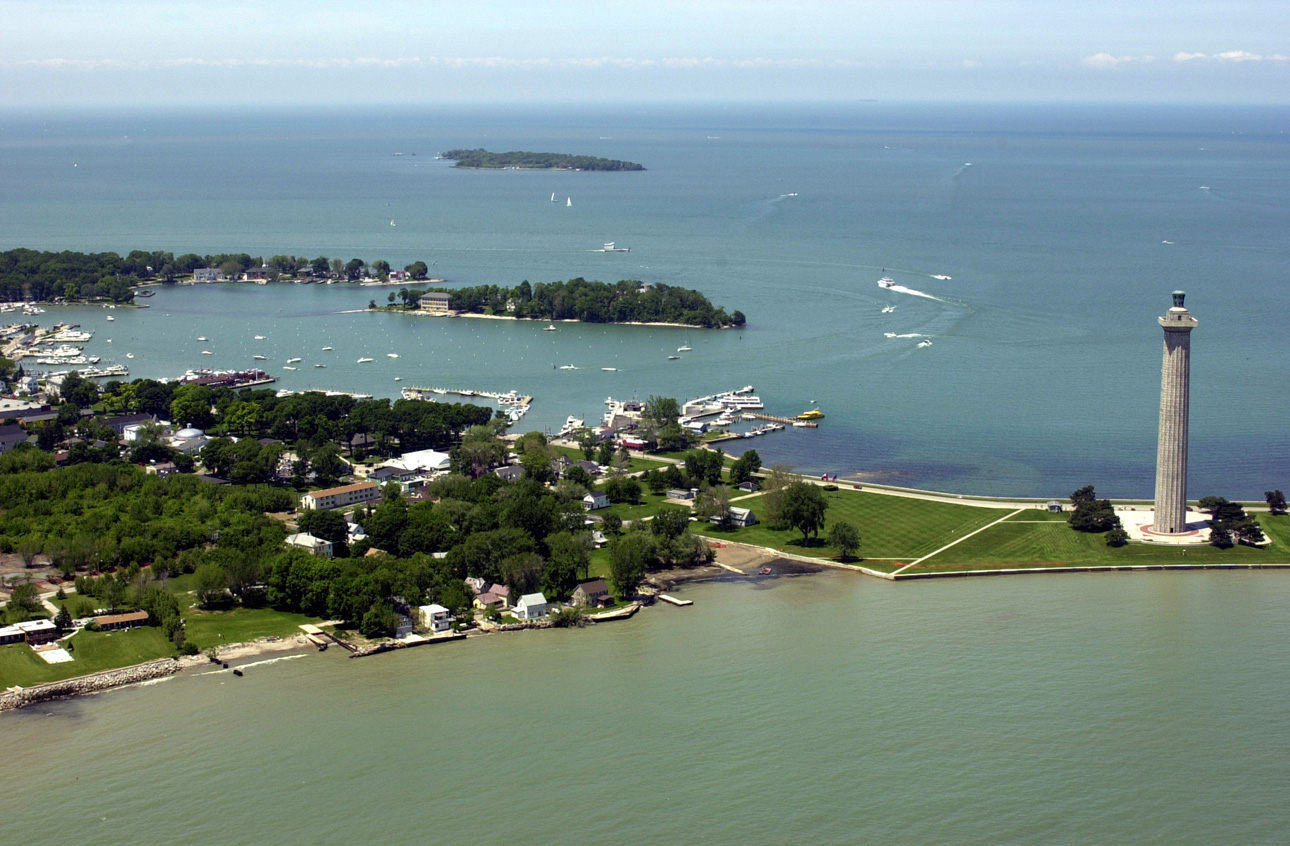
- View of Put-in-Bay and the Perry Memorial

- Flag
- Interactive map of Put-in-Bay, Ohio
- Location within Ohio Location within the United States
- Coordinates: 41°39′11″N 82°49′02″W
- Country: United States
- State: Ohio
- County: Ottawa
- Township: Put-in-Bay
- Incorporated: 1877

Government
  - Mayor: Judy Berry

Area
  - Total: 0.62 sq mi (1.61 km^{2})
  - Land: 0.44 sq mi (1.14 km^{2})
  - Water: 0.19 sq mi (0.48 km^{2})
- Elevation: 584 ft (178 m)

Population (2020)
  - Total: 154
  - Density: 350.4/sq mi (135.29/km^{2})
- Time zone: UTC-5 (EST)
  - Summer (DST): UTC-4 (EDT)
- ZIP code: 43456
- Area code: 419
- FIPS code: 39-65032
- GNIS feature ID: 1060971
- Website: http://villageofpib.com/

Put-in-Bay is a resort village located on South Bass Island in Ottawa County, Ohio, United States. The population was 154 at the 2020 census. It is 85 miles (137 km) west of Cleveland and 35 miles (56 km) east of Toledo.

Ferry and airline services connect the community with Catawba Island, Kelleys Island, Port Clinton, and Sandusky, Ohio. The bay played a significant role in the War of 1812 as the location of the squadron of U.S. naval commander Oliver Hazard Perry, who sailed from the port on September 10, 1813, to engage a British squadron just north of the island in the Battle of Lake Erie.

== History ==
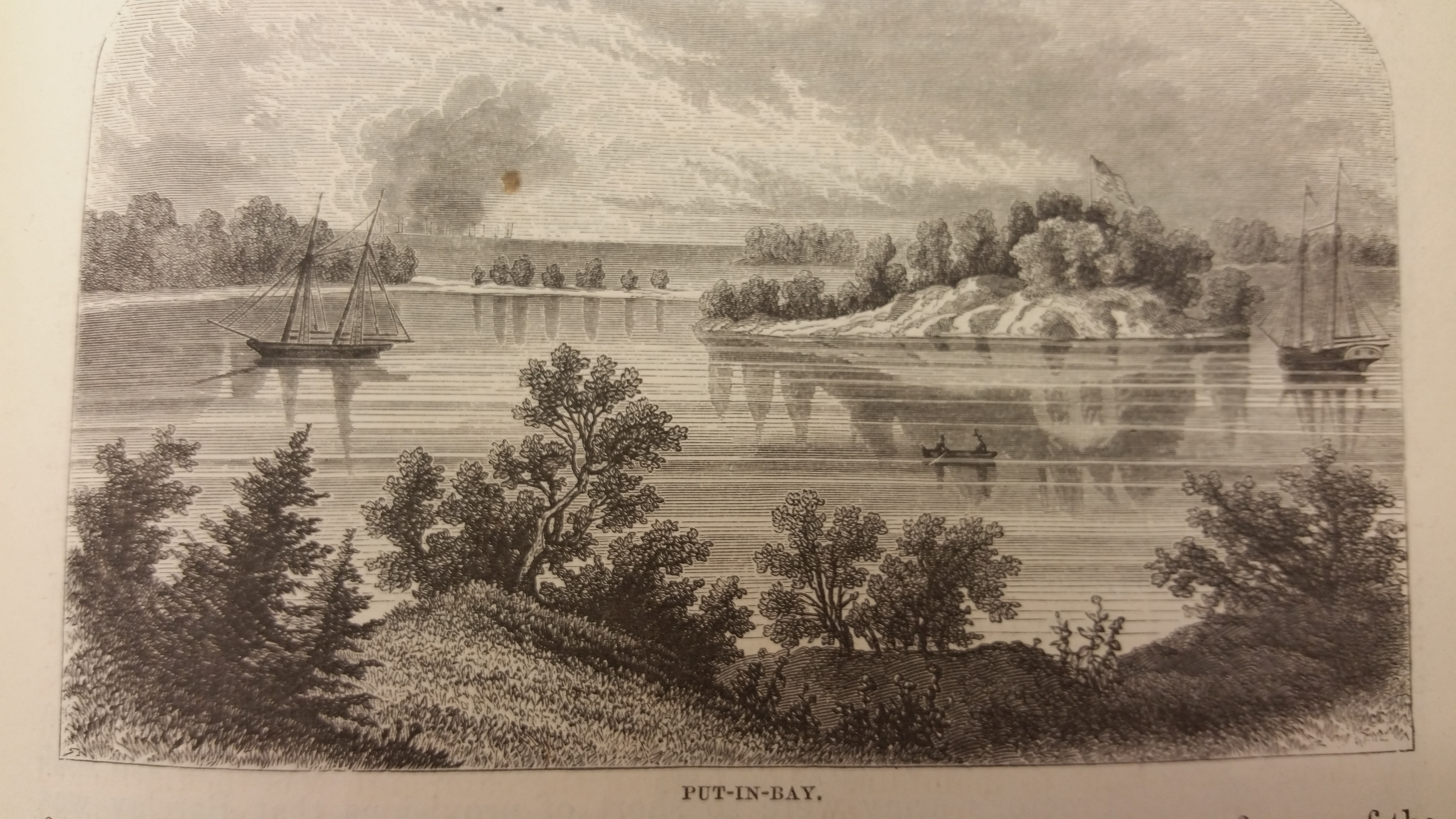
Put-in-Bay in the early 19th century

The first known people to use the island were various groups of Native American tribes, including the Ottawas, Miamis, Shawnee, Senecas, Iroquois, and the Eries. The island provided shelter during crossings of Lake Erie. Some remains were discovered when a section of the island was plowed.

In 1679, Robert LaSalle and thirty-two of his men were the first to sail a large vessel in the Great Lakes: the Griffon. They would transport fur and pelts from Green Bay, Wisconsin to Queensland, Ontario. Stopping at Middle Bass Island, they found unique undiscovered flowers. They named the island Isle des Fleurs because of the flowers; this name was used for the next 200 years.

During the War of 1812, Put-in-Bay was an important base of operations for a United States Navy squadron under Oliver Hazard Perry. Perry and his squadron arrived at the island on August 16, 1813. They used the island to train and to spy on nearby British forces located at Fort Malden in Ontario, Canada. At that point, the war had been going on for 14 months and had favored the British; Detroit had surrendered to them, and all American invasions of Canada had been repulsed. On September 10, 1813, British Captain Robert Heriot Barclay, commanding a small Royal Navy squadron of six ships, had come looking for a fight. Perry and his squadron came out to meet them. The Battle of Lake Erie began at 11:45 in the morning about eight miles away from Put-in-Bay. By around 3:00 of that day Perry, despite being forced to transfer his flag from the badly damaged Lawrence, had overpowered Barclay's smaller squadron. The battle resulted in the Americans gaining control over Lake Erie for the duration of the war.

Between 1820 and 1830 the island was under the jurisdiction of Huron County, Ohio, but it was later joined to Ottawa County, Ohio. Put-in-Bay Township was established after 1830. The island was only sparsely inhabited and there was no actual village prior to the creation of the township. The first known white resident of the island was Alexander Ewen, who had about 1,000 hogs roaming the island in 1810.

The abolitionist John Brown's son John Jr. lived in Put-In-Bay, "growing grapes for the Chicago market", from 1862 until his death in 1895. His brother Owen also lived there before moving to Pasadena, California.

== Geography ==
Put-in-Bay is located 15 miles (24 km) northwest of Sandusky, Ohio. According to the United States Census Bureau, the village has a total area of 0.63 square miles (1.63 km^{2}), of which 0.45 square miles (1.17 km^{2}) is land and 0.18 square miles (0.47 km^{2}) is water.

=== Climate ===
Put-in-Bay has a hot-summer humid continental climate (Köppen: Dfa) with warm to hot summers and cold winters.

Climate data for Put-in-Bay
Month	Jan	Feb	Mar	Apr	May	Jun	Jul	Aug	Sep	Oct	Nov	Dec	Year
Record high °F (°C)	66 (19)	70 (21)	81 (27)	89 (32)	92 (33)	104 (40)	104 (40)	103 (39)	97 (36)	91 (33)	79 (26)	68 (20)	104 (40)
Mean daily maximum °F (°C)	31.9 (−0.1)	34.2 (1.2)	43.1 (6.2)	55.3 (12.9)	66.2 (19.0)	76.1 (24.5)	80.8 (27.1)	79.6 (26.4)	72.8 (22.7)	60.6 (15.9)	48.9 (9.4)	36.0 (2.2)	57.2 (14.0)
Daily mean °F (°C)	25.8 (−3.4)	28.0 (−2.2)	36.1 (2.3)	47.7 (8.7)	59.1 (15.1)	69.2 (20.7)	74.1 (23.4)	73.1 (22.8)	66.3 (19.1)	54.1 (12.3)	43.1 (6.2)	30.9 (−0.6)	50.7 (10.4)
Mean daily minimum °F (°C)	19.6 (−6.9)	21.8 (−5.7)	29.2 (−1.6)	40.1 (4.5)	52.0 (11.1)	62.3 (16.8)	67.4 (19.7)	66.7 (19.3)	59.7 (15.4)	47.6 (8.7)	37.3 (2.9)	25.9 (−3.4)	44.2 (6.8)
Record low °F (°C)	−18 (−28)	−19 (−28)	−2 (−19)	13 (−11)	30 (−1)	40 (4)	41 (5)	50 (10)	37 (3)	24 (−4)	6 (−14)	−14 (−26)	−19 (−28)
Average precipitation inches (mm)	1.91 (49)	1.68 (43)	2.42 (61)	3.03 (77)	3.72 (94)	3.23 (82)	3.45 (88)	3.29 (84)	2.95 (75)	2.67 (68)	2.65 (67)	2.19 (56)	33.19 (843)
Average snowfall inches (cm)	6.4 (16)	5.2 (13)	2.9 (7.4)	0.4 (1.0)	0.0 (0.0)	0.0 (0.0)	0.0 (0.0)	0.0 (0.0)	0.0 (0.0)	0.0 (0.0)	0.6 (1.5)	4.5 (11)	19.9 (51)
Average precipitation days (≥ 0.01 in)	9.7	8.5	9.9	11.2	11.0	9.2	8.2	8.0	8.2	8.5	9.6	9.9	113.9
Source 1: NOAA (normals 1981-2010)
Source 2: Weatherbase

== Demographics ==
Historical population
Census	Pop.	Note	%±
1880	381		—
1890	282		−26.0%
1900	317		12.4%
1910	259		−18.3%
1920	216		−16.6%
1930	226		4.6%
1940	202		−10.6%
1950	191		−5.4%
1960	357		86.9%
1970	135		−62.2%
1980	146		8.1%
1990	141		−3.4%
2000	128		−9.2%
2010	138		7.8%
2020	154		11.6%
U.S. Decennial Census

=== 2010 census ===
As of the census of 2010, there were 138 people, 70 households, and 43 families residing in the village. The population density was 306.7 inhabitants per square mile (118.4/km^{2}). There were 263 housing units at an average density of 584.4 units per square mile (225.6 units/km^{2}). The racial makeup of the village was 100.0% White.

There were 70 households, of which 17.1% had children under the age of 18 living with them, 52.9% were married couples living together, 4.3% had a female householder with no husband present, 4.3% had a male householder with no wife present, and 38.6% were non-families. 32.9% of all households were made up of individuals, and 10% had someone living alone who was 65 years of age or older. The average household size was 1.94 and the average family size was 2.44.

The median age in the village was 54.7 years. 15.2% of residents were under the age of 18; 2.2% were between the ages of 18 and 24; 15.1% were from 25 to 44; 38.4% were from 45 to 64; and 29% were 65 years of age or older. The gender makeup of the village was 52.9% male and 47.1% female.

== Tourism ==
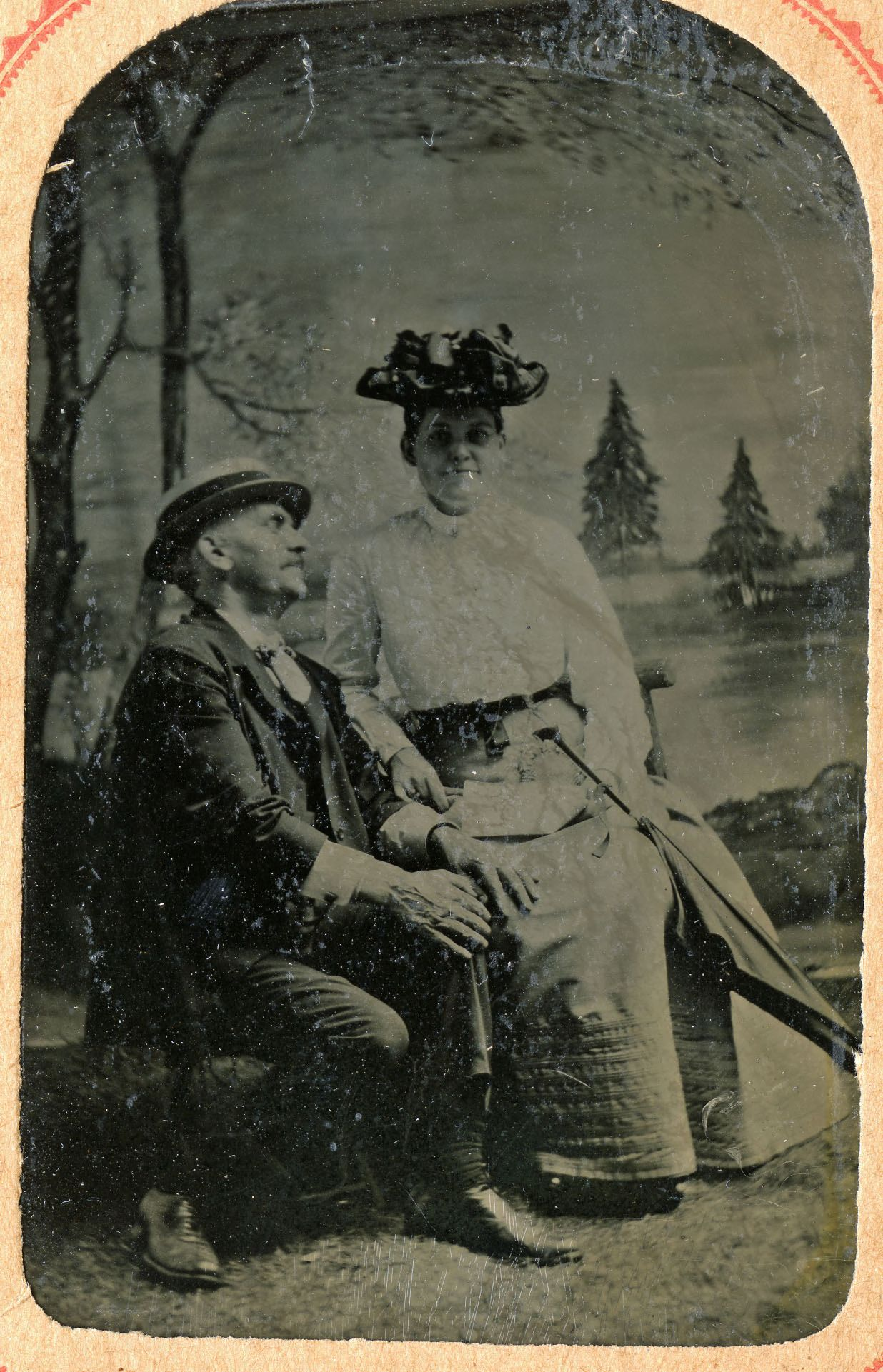
Toledo Mayor Samuel M. Jones on holiday in Put-In-Bay with his wife Helen, 1901

Put-in-Bay is the site of Perry's Victory and International Peace Memorial, which commemorates the American victory at the Battle of Lake Erie. Construction of the monument began in 1912 and it opened to the public on June 13, 1915. It is 352 feet (107 m) tall and made up of 78 layers of pink granite, topped with an eleven ton (10 metric ton) bronze urn. Its height makes it the highest open-air observatory operated by the U.S. National Park Service. The remains of six naval officers, three Britons and three Americans, were interred beneath the floor of the monument's rotunda.

For most of its history, the island's primary industry has been tourism and continues to be today. The tourist season runs roughly between April and October. The most common methods of transportation to and from the island are via ferry boat, propeller-driven aircraft and private boat.

One of the world's largest hotels, the Hotel Victory, opened its 625 rooms to the public in 1892. The four-story hotel featured a one-thousand-seat dining room. However, on August 14, 1919, the giant hotel burned to the ground. Today only parts of the foundations can be seen at the state campground.

Other historical sites include:

- Stonehenge Estate – An estate with 19th-century buildings that are listed on the National Register of Historic Places.
- Perry's Cave – Cave discovered by Native Americans. Perry sent men here during the War of 1812 (Battle of Lake Erie). Has an underground lake from which Perry's men obtained drinking water, after previously drinking from the bacteria filled Lake Erie water and getting sick. The water in the cave was clean and thus by drinking it, his men returned to health in order to win the battle.
- Heineman's winery and Crystal Cave – the world's largest geode.
- Lake Erie Islands Historical Society – 6,000 square foot (560 m^{2}) museum that houses artifacts, memorabilia and genealogical data pertinent to the Lake Erie Islands.

There are under 150 full-time South Bass Island residents, most of whom remain on the island over the winter. Supplies and perishables are flown to the island during the winter months along with the mail, parcels, and bank employees who staff the island's only bank (for one day a week) until the spring. The island has a single school that is used for grades kindergarten through 12 and serves the educational requirements of Middle Bass and North Bass islands as well. These students arrive by plane, boat, or ATV across the frozen lake, depending on the season and weather.

Put-in-Bay has one grocery store, one hardware store, one school—which houses the one lending library branch—one fuel station, a post office, one bank, and two cemeteries. It has one seasonal franchise restaurant, Subway. There is no cinema. The island does not have a hospital, but does have an Emergency Medical Service that can use a Life Flight helicopter to transport critically ill patients to mainland medical facilities.

In 1952–1959, as well as 1963, the island held road races around a 3-mile (4.8 km) course. In 2011, the Put-in-Bay Road Races Reunion returned to the island. The temporary road course set up at the Put-in-Bay Airport during the event was a key step in pointing the way to the return of real vintage sports car racing to the island for 2012.

The Boy Scouts of America hold an annual camporee at the base of Perry's Monument.

== Education ==
The village is home to Put-in-Bay High School. Aside from South Bass Island, Put-In-Bay Local School District covers the Lake Erie Islands of Buckeye Island, Gibraltar Island, Green Island, Mouse Island, Rattlesnake Island, and Starve Island, even though most of these islands are uninhabited.

== Transportation ==
SR 357 is the main highway in the village. Put-in-Bay Airport offers a single, unlit, paved 2870-foot runway in addition to a helipad. North Bass Island Airport offers a 1,804 ft (550 m) (549.9 m) paved airstrip.

== Gallery ==
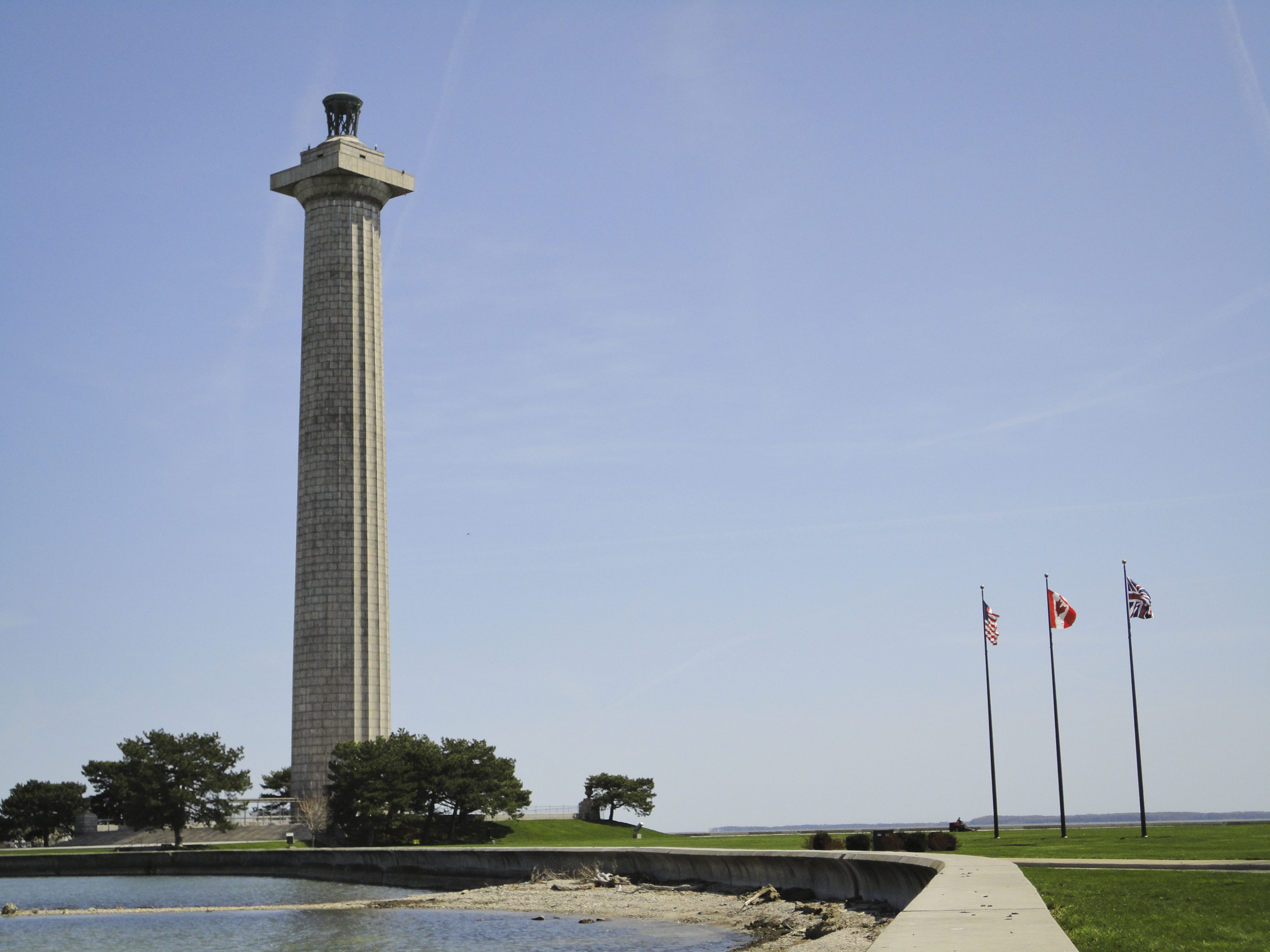
Perry's Victory and International Peace Memorial

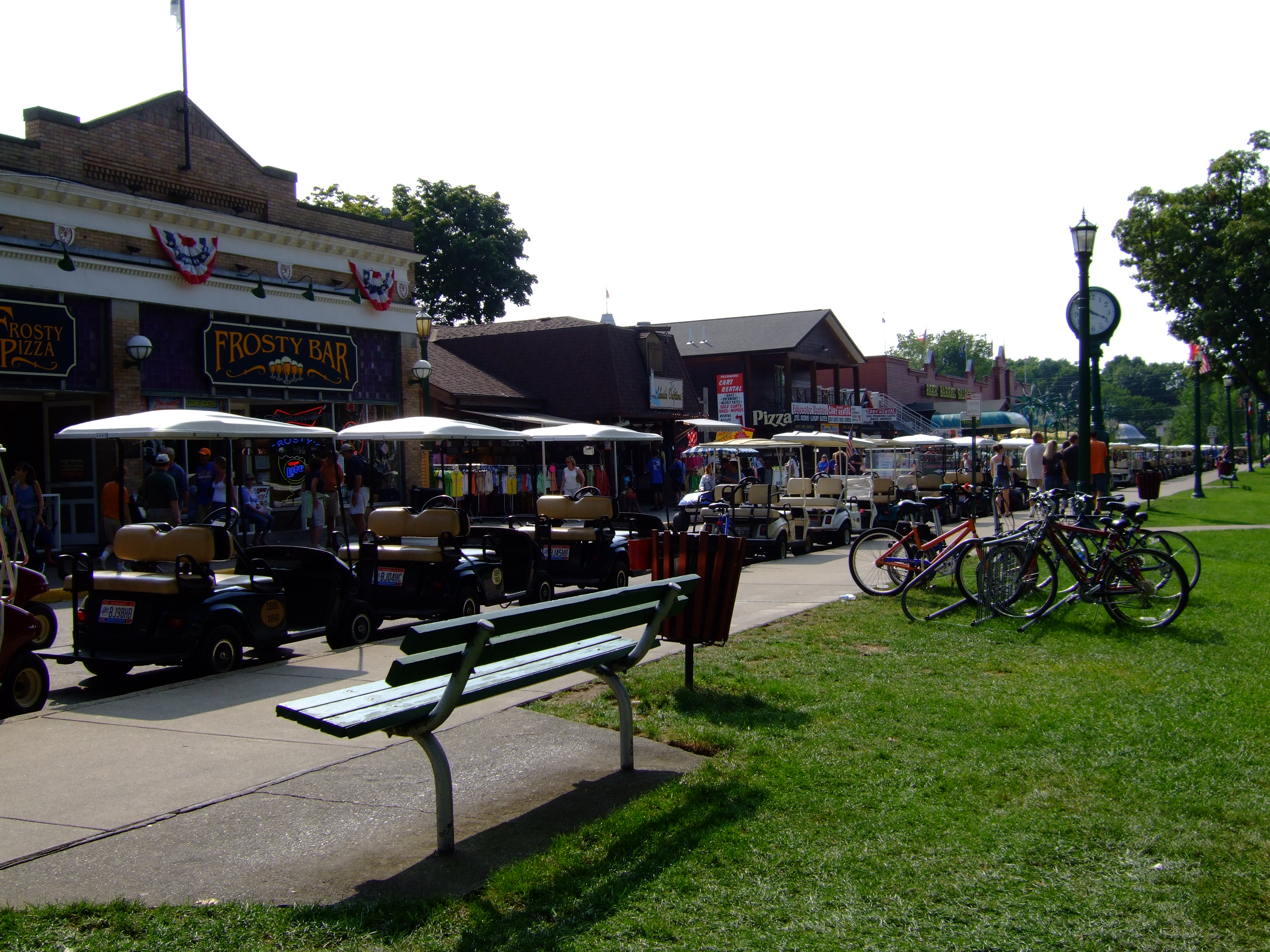
Delaware Avenue on South Bass

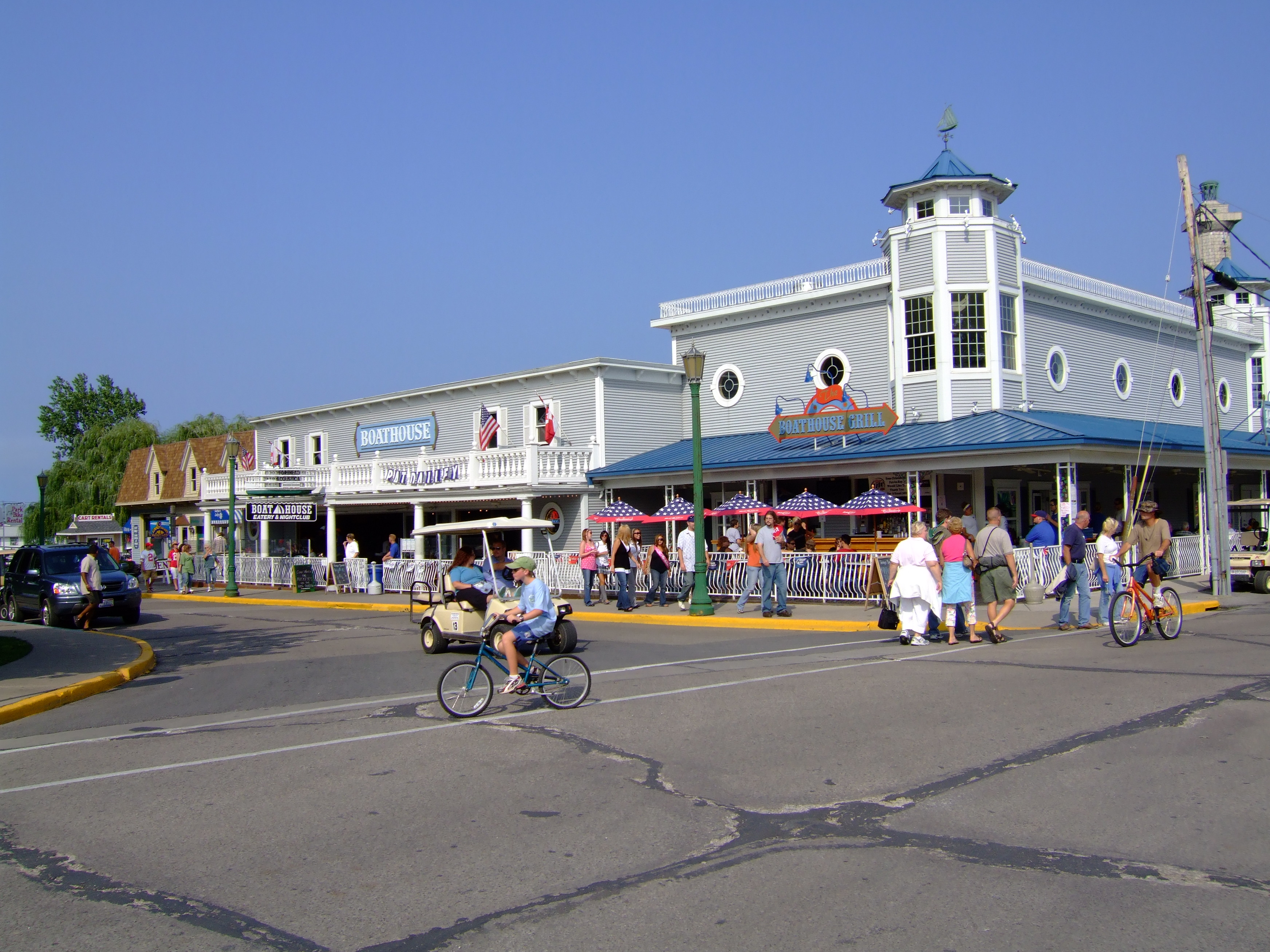
Delaware Avenue at Hartford Avenue

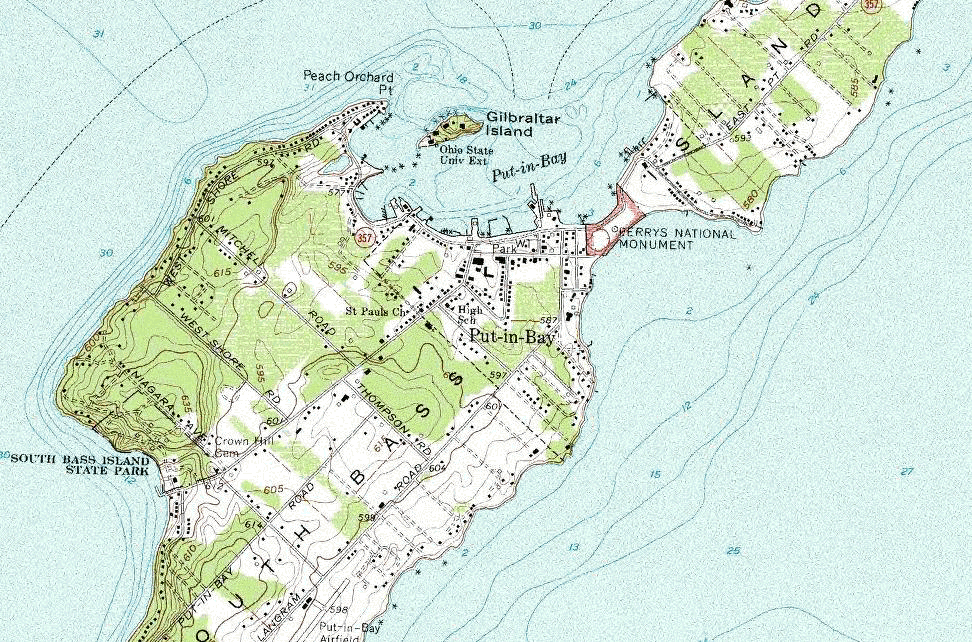
Topographic map of the island

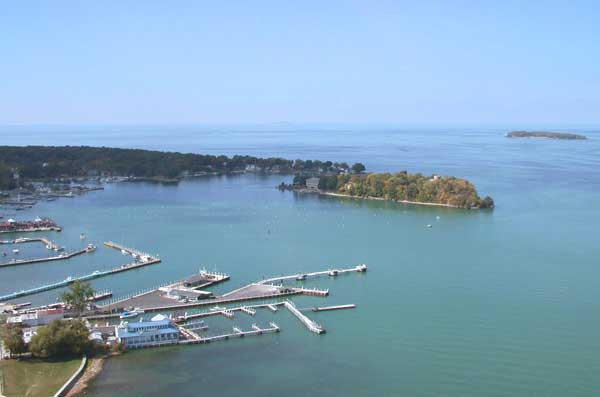
Put-in-Bay harbor

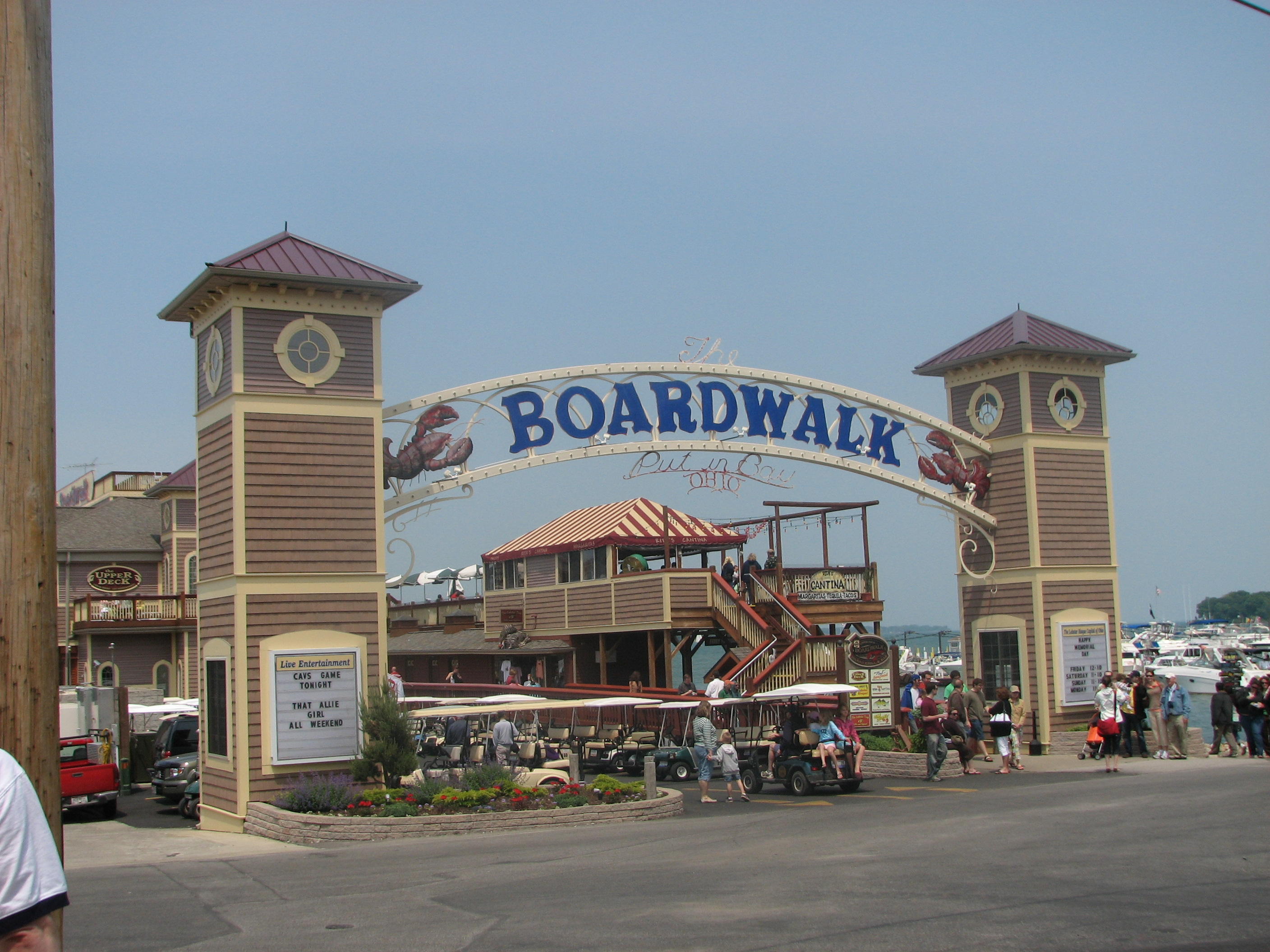
Entrance to the boardwalk

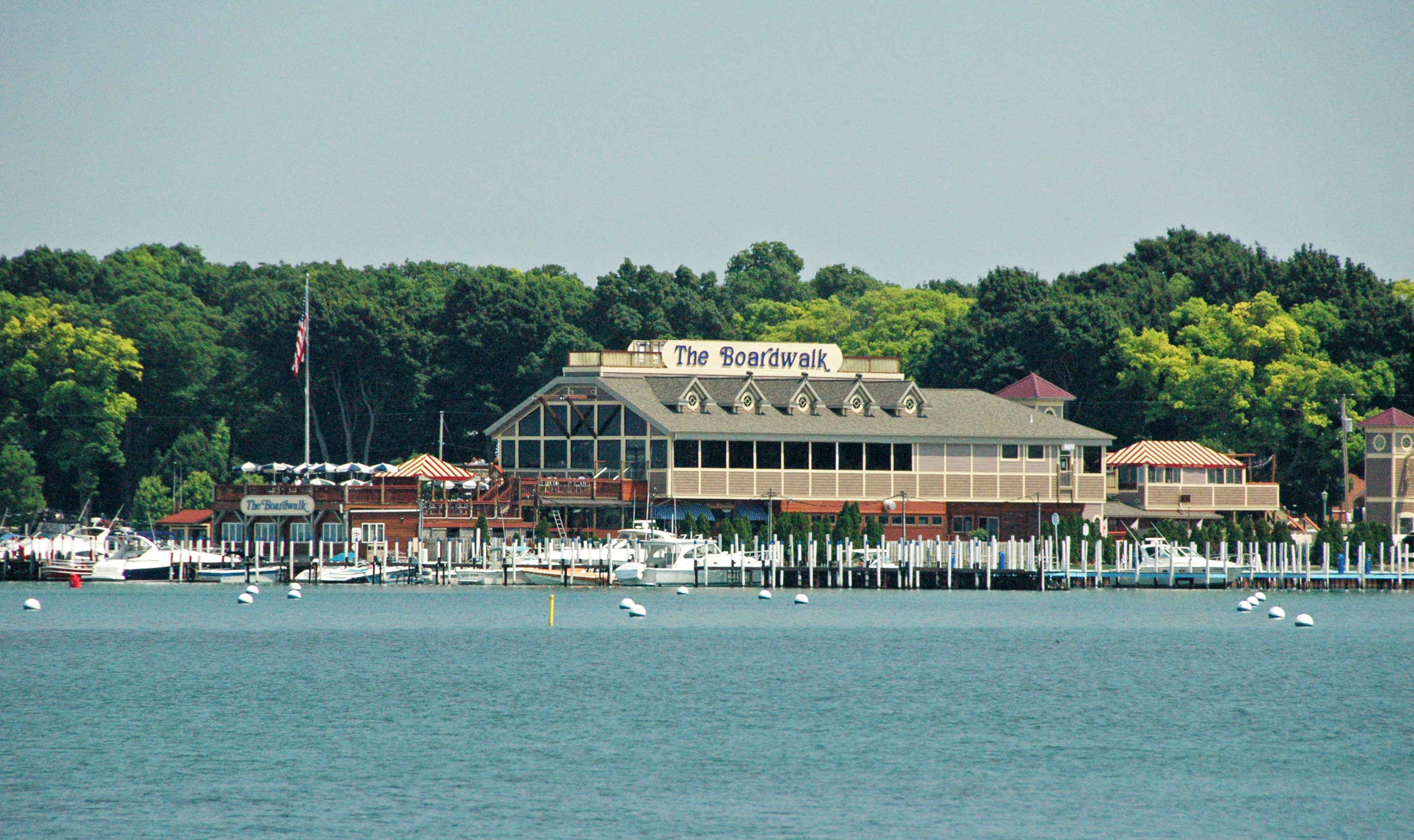
Boardwalk from the bay

== See also ==
- Populated islands of the Great Lakes
