= Green Island Light (Ohio) =

Lighthouse in Ohio, US

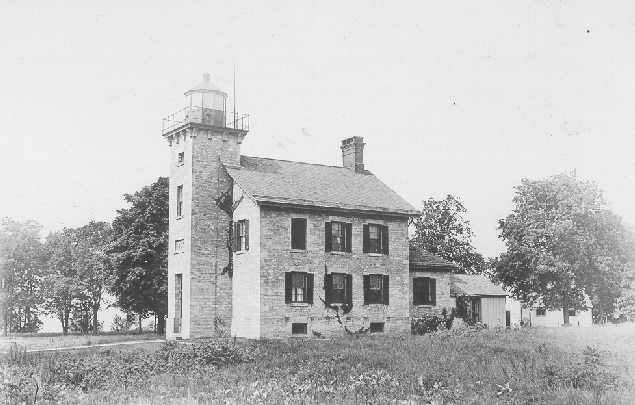
- 1904 view of the Green Island Light (USCG)
- Location: Green Island in Lake Erie
- Coordinates: 41.6455°N 82.8675°W

Tower
- Constructed: 1855
- Construction: Wood (1st); Stone (2nd)
- Automated: 1926
- Shape: two story house with tower on end
- Heritage: National Register of Historic Places listed place

Light
- First lit: 1855 (1st tower); 1864 (2nd tower)
- Deactivated: 1939
- Focal height: 24 m (79 ft)
- Characteristic: Fl W 2.5s

The Green Island Light is a lighthouse located on Green Island in Lake Erie, U.S. state of Ohio, to the west of the Bass Islands. Abandoned since its deactivation in 1939, it survives as a hollow shell near the existing skeleton tower.

== History ==
Green Island attracted attention beginning in 1820 when celestite, a source of strontium, was discovered there during a boundary survey. The United States government purchased the island in 1851, and in 1854 the first lighthouse was built, a wooden structure of which no definite image remains. This light was equipped with a reflector system.

The lighthouse caught fire on December 31, 1863, during a ferocious storm in which the temperature dropped to minus 25 degrees. The lighthouse keeper, Charles Drake, his wife and daughter were forced to take refuge in an outhouse, wrapped in a pair of comforters, after an unsuccessful attempt to quench the fire with buckets of lake water. Drake's son Pitt, attending a party at Put-in-Bay, was dissuaded from braving the storm; the next day he went with a rescue party to the island to find nothing standing but the outhouse. Though suffering from exposure, the three refugees were found alive.

The following year a new light was erected, a two-story limestone residence with a square tower applied to one end. In later years a small barn was added to house livestock belonging to the keeper; newspaper reports state that one keeper also maintained a team of greyhounds which pulled his children across the ice to school by sled. In 1889 a boathouse was constructed at the northeast corner of the island, and a walkway, originally of planks but later of concrete, was run the length of the island to link it to the light.

By 1900 mining on the island had ceased, and in 1926 the light was automated and the residence abandoned. In 1939 a new steel tower, considerably taller than the old light, was erected on the extreme southwest corner of the island. The old light was discontinued, and at some point vandals set it afire, leaving only the tower and the shell of the house standing among the trees which have grown up in the pasture which once surrounded the station.
