= Jim Ladd (American football) =

American football player (1932–1996)

No. 87
- Position: End

Personal information
- Born: July 29, 1932; Put-in-Bay, Ohio, U.S.
- Died: November 13, 1996 (aged 64); Indianapolis, Indiana, U.S.
- Listed height: 6 ft 4 in (1.93 m)
- Listed weight: 205 lb (93 kg)

Career information
- High school: Put-in-Bay (OH)
- College: Bowling Green
- NFL draft: 1954: 20th round, 234th overall pick

Career history
- Chicago Bears (1954)*; Chicago Cardinals (1954, 1956, 1957)
- * Offseason or practice squad member only

Career NFL statistics
- Games played: 11
- Receptions: 22
- Receiving Yards: 254
- Stats at Pro Football Reference

James W. Ladd (July 29, 1932 – November 13, 1996) was an American professional football end who played for the Chicago Cardinals (now known as the Arizona Cardinals). He had multiple stints with the team but only played in 1954. He went to college at Bowling Green. He was drafted in the 20th round (234th overall) by the Chicago Bears in 1954. In his NFL career, he played in 11 games, and had 22 catches for 254 yards.
