= Hotel Victory =

Hotel in Ohio, U.S.

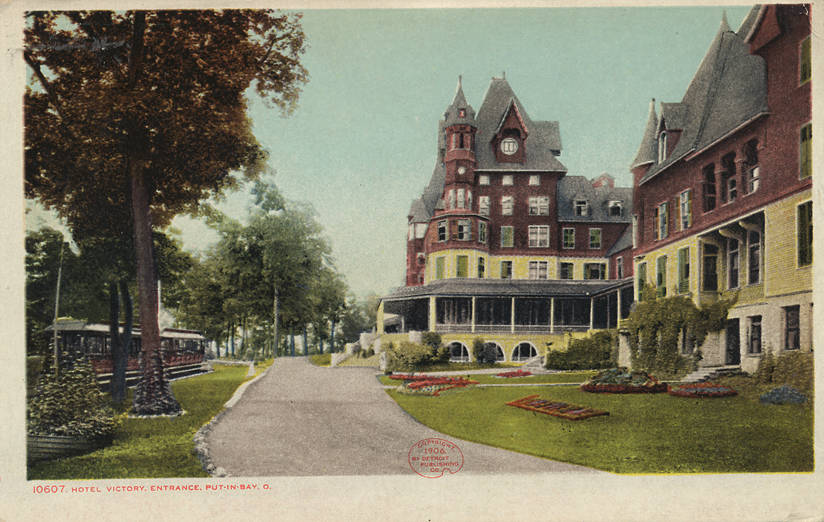
Hotel Victory, Entrances

The Hotel Victory was built on South Bass Island near Put in Bay, Ohio, by James K. Tillotson and a group of investors opening in 1892. It was once one of the largest hotels in the United States but it was destroyed by fire in August 1919.

== Description ==
The Hotel Victory consisted of one main building, another building with dining rooms and servant quarters, as well as a Natatorium. It was designed by E.O. Fallis and the Feick Construction Company of Sandusky built the frame and structure, laying the cornerstone in September 1889.

The main building was in the shape of a rectangle frame that was 600 feet wide by 300 feet deep and three stories high. The frame surrounded an inner courtyard that measured 200 square feet. This main building housed the 625 guest rooms, 80 of which were suites with a bath. Other features of the main building included three elevators, bell boy stations on every floor, steam heating, and incandescent lights.

Connected to the main building by a grand lobby was the building that housed the main dining hall, the ordinary dining hall, the kitchen, and the servant quarters. The main dining hall was 155 feet long, 85 feet wide, and 52 feet high. The ordinary dining hall was 100 feet long and 50 feet wide. Together, the main and ordinary dining halls could serve up to 1,200 guests at a time. It was the largest summer resort hotel in the world and averaged 1,000 guests a day in 1899. It had about 250 staff, most of whom were Black.

The Natatorium, or swimming pool, was added to the hotel in preparation for the season on 1898. It was located in front of the hotel. The pool itself had a cement bottom and sides as well as a full canopy.

Two of its managers were T. W. McCreary and Frank T. Peterson.

== 1919 fire ==
On August 14, 1919, a fire began in the hotel, possibly due to a faulty light wire. The flames originated in a cupola and quickly spread to the entire third floor. People in the hotel were notified by a phone call coming from outside of the building. There were 50 guests in the hotel at the time and all escaped uninjured. The fire could be seen from the lower end of the Detroit River. The Fire department had no hope of stopping the blaze and worked to keep it from spreading to other buildings. As the structure burned, thieves took to removing the furniture, furnishings, and guest's personal belongings. The loss was estimated at $450–500,000.

=== Ruins ===
Today, only the ruins of The Hotel Victory remain. The Natatorium, can still be viewed from up on the hill where the hotel once stood in the camping grounds of the state park. The site of the bronze statue "Winged Victory" remains intact. However, the actual statue was removed from the island and used for scrap metal.
