= Green Island (Ohio) =

Small island in Lake Erie, Ohio, USA

Coordinates: 41.6456°N 82.8651°W

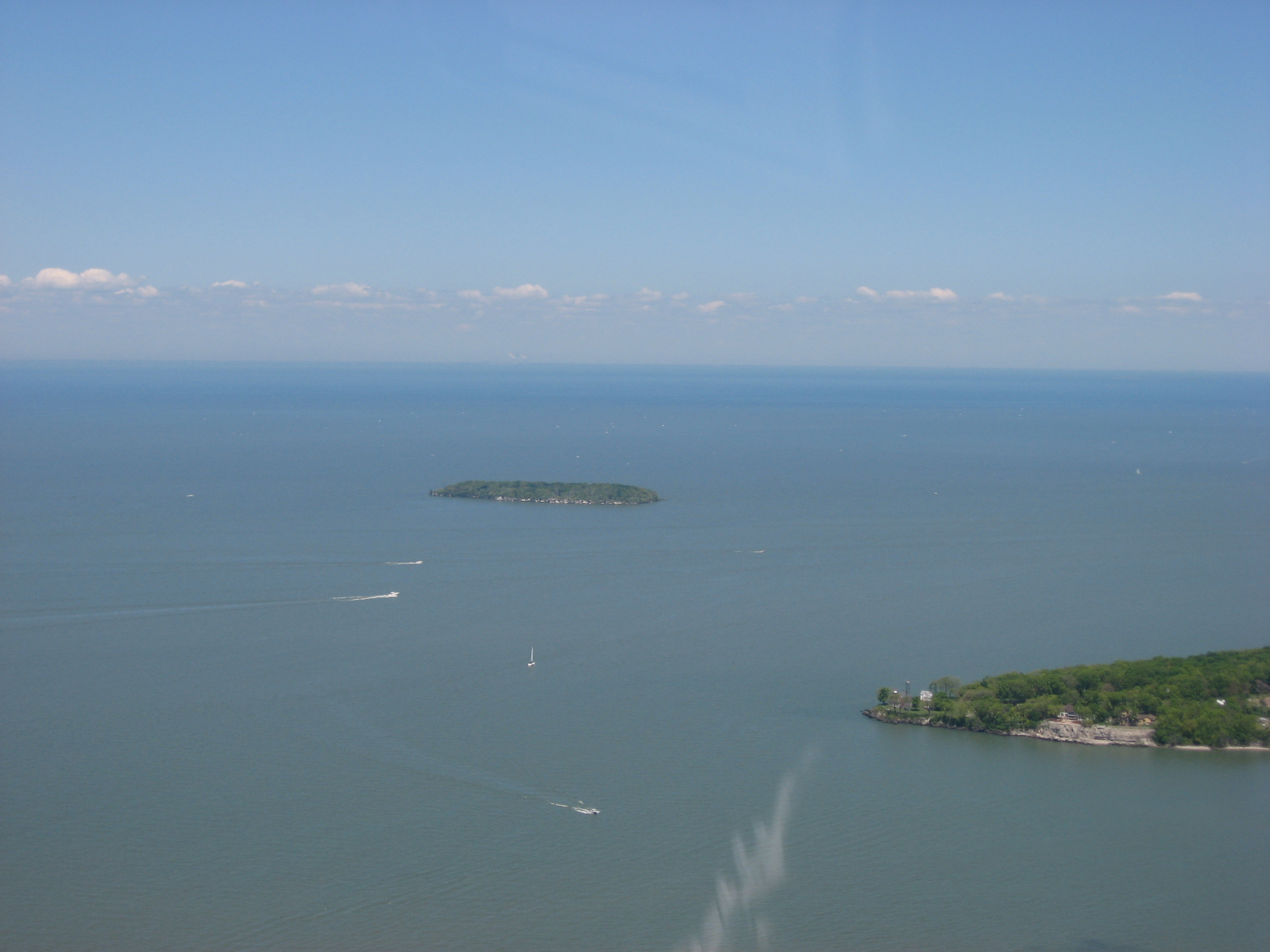
- Green Island from the air, with South Bass Island, Ohio in the foreground
- Interactive map of Green Island

Geography
- Location: Lake Erie
- Area: 17 acres (6.9 ha)

Administration
- US
- State: Ohio
- County: Ottawa
- Township: Put-in-Bay

Additional information
- Time zone: ET (UTC-5)
  - Summer (DST): EDT (UTC-4)

Green Island is a small 17-acre (0.07 km²) island of the U.S. state of Ohio, in Lake Erie. It is located approximately three miles southwest of Put-in-Bay. It is part of Put-in-Bay Township, in Ottawa County.

== History ==
The U.S. Government bought Green Island in December 1851. A lighthouse was later constructed on the island in 1855. The most famous keeper of the lighthouse was Colonel Charles F. Drake, who lived on the island with his family until the lighthouse burned down on New Year's Eve in 1863. A new, two-story lighthouse was constructed on the island in 1864. It remained active until 1939, when the U.S. Coast Guard replaced it with a skeletal tower with an automated light on top. Green Island is currently a wildlife refuge, managed by the Ohio Department of Natural Resources, and is no longer open to the public.
