= Local post =

Mail service operating within a limited geographical area

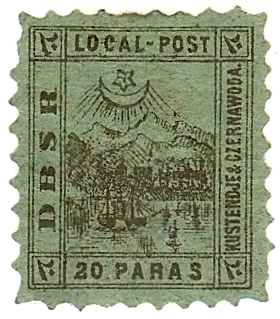
An 1865 local stamp of the Danube and Black Sea Railway Kustendje Harbour Company Limited

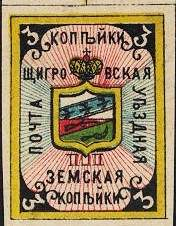
An 1882 Zemstvo stamp

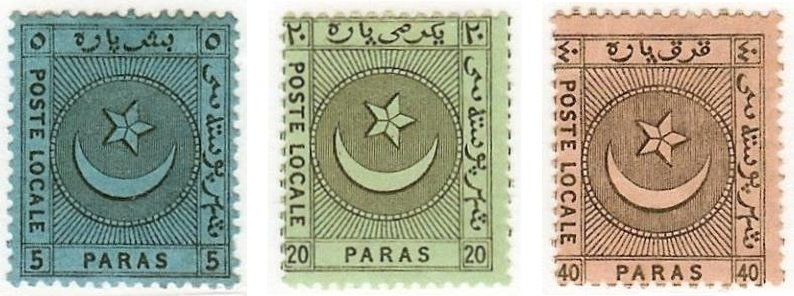
Local stamps of the 1865 Liannos et Cie post in Constantinople

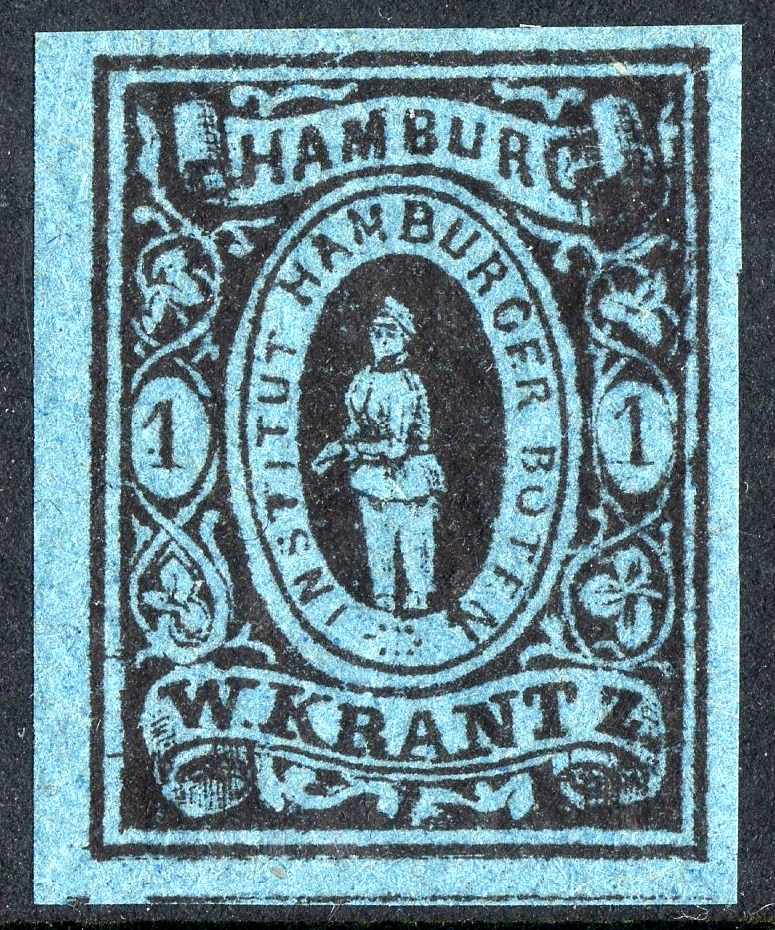
Private local postage stamp of Hamburg, issued 1863

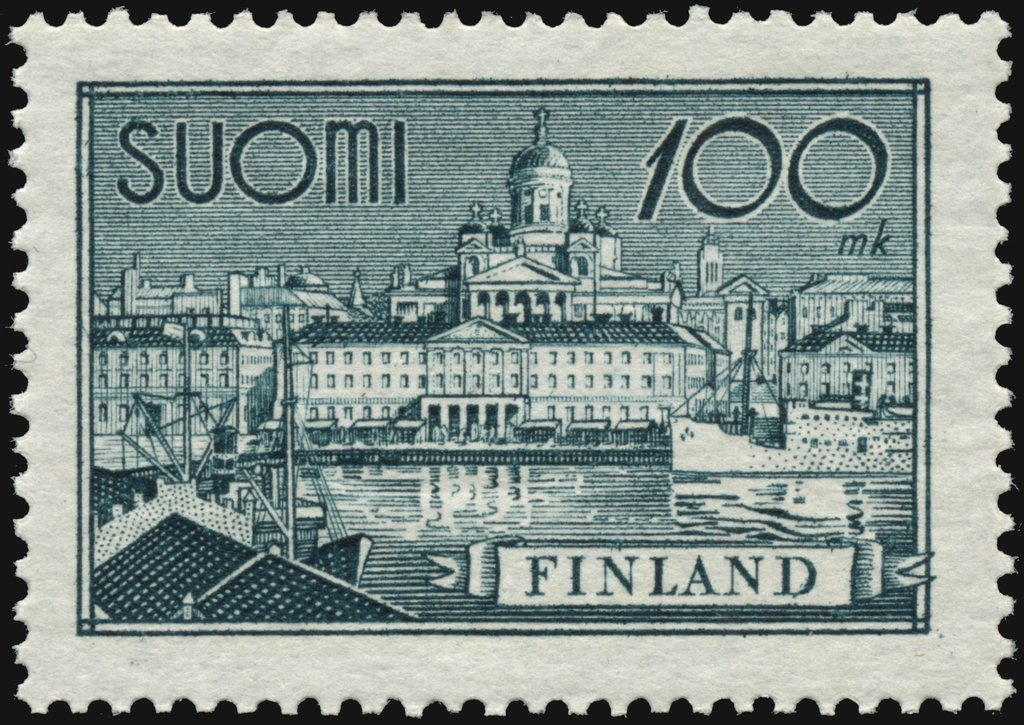
Local postage stamp of Helsinki, issued 1955

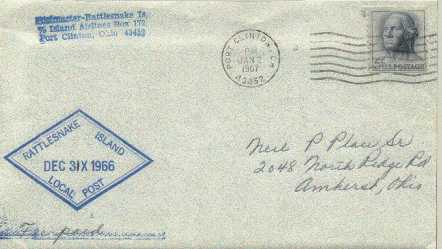
A Rattlesnake Island local post cover of 31 December 1966

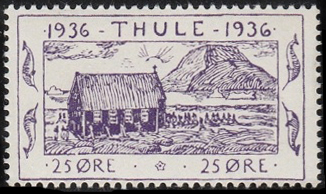
A local post stamp of Thule, Greenland

A local post is a mail service that operates only within a limited geographical area, typically a city or a single transportation route. Historically, some local posts have been operated by governments, while others, known as private local posts have been for-profit companies. Today, many stamp collectors operate hobbyists' local posts, issuing their own postal stamps known as "locals" or "cinderellas" for other collectors but rarely carrying any mail.

== Official local posts ==
Government local posts go back to at least 1680, when the Penny Post was established in London to handle intra-city mail delivery at a uniform rate of one penny.

From 1840 onwards, when postage stamps were first introduced, special stamps were often issued; for instance the cantons of Switzerland issued stamps for use within a canton, and inscribed them "Poste-Local" or "Orts-Post". The Russian province of Wenden issued stamps for a local post from 1862 to 1901, while Nicaragua issued stamps for Zelaya only, due to its use of a different currency.

In rural Russia Zemstvo Post handled local mail independently of the central government; some of these lasted until the 1917 revolution.

== Private local posts ==
Many countries have had private local posts at one time or another. Usually these operated with the acquiescence of the government, and at other times in competition. Types of local posts included intra-city systems, transcontinental delivery (such as the Pony Express), and riverboat routes. Many of these existed for only short periods, and little is known of their operations. Some of their stamps are among the great rarities of philately.

In 1865, the local post distribution company Liannos et Cie was established in Constantinople to distribute mail arriving in the city that was not addressed in Arabic, as the staff of the Ottoman Postal Service were unable to read the Latin alphabet. The stamps were printed by Perkins Bacon from plates that are now held in the museum of the Royal Philatelic Society London. In 1866, a second service was set up on behalf of the Egyptian post office operating in the city to solve the same problem. Both services were short-lived.

In 1895, W. Frese & Co. of San Francisco, acting as an agent of the Oceanic Phosphate Company, issued a series of postage stamps for mail carried between California at the company's guano mining operations on Clipperton Island, which ended in 1898.

In the absence of a governing authority for the New Hebrides (present-day Vanuatu), the Australasian New Hebrides Company issued postage stamps in 1897 for the carriage of mail on its inter-island steamers.

In 2012, Penny Farthing Post in Bude, Cornwall, England, operated a mail service for Bude, Stratton, and Poughill, delivering post on a penny-farthing bicycle for 25 pence. Graham Eccles printed his own stamps and set up the service in response to the Royal Mail raising postage stamp prices to 60 pence. Closed June 2012, due to excessive volumes of post.

In 2013, Welly Post was established as a private carrier of local mail by EJ Teare Newsagents in Wellington, Somerset, England. Local delivery was limited to the village of Wellington and 2.5 miles (4.0 km) miles outside the village. The service was established after customers complained about the high price of postage.

== Private local posts of the United States ==
Private local posts typically issue their own stamps, which can become collector's items. These stamps are typically cancelled with special cancellations, and their first day of issue can be thus commemorated.

=== American Letter Mail Company ===
In 1844, Lysander Spooner founded the American Letter Mail Company, competing with the legal monopoly of the United States Post Office (USPO), now the United States Postal Service (USPS), in violation of the Private Express Statutes. It succeeded in delivering mail for lower prices, but the U.S. government challenged Spooner with legal measures, eventually forcing him to cease operations in 1851.

=== Hawai'i Post ===
From the late 1990s to 2014, the Honolulu-based messenger service Hawai'i Post printed stamps for use with its local delivery service for Waikiki.

=== Independent Postal System of America ===
In 1968, Thomas M. Murray (1927–2003) founded the Independent Postal System of America (IPSA) as a nationwide commercial carrier of Third and Fourth Class Mail, in direct competition with the United States Post Office (USPO), now the United States Postal Service (USPS). But in 1971, when the company entered the First Class delivery business, they endured a number of lawsuits brought against them, which finally led to the company's collapse in the mid-1970s. The company issued a number of stamps during the years of its operation, including commemoratives for Lyndon B. Johnson, Martin Luther King Jr. and Charles Lindbergh before the USPS did.

=== Rattlesnake Island ===
Rattlesnake Island is an 85-acre (0.34 km^{2}) island located on Lake Erie near Put-In-Bay, 11 miles (18 km) northeast of Port Clinton, Ohio, and had the only USPS-sanctioned local post operating in the United States. For many years, service was provided by way of a Ford Trimotor which shuttled mail between the island and the mainland. From 1966 to 1989, USPS mail was routed by way of Port Clinton, Ohio. It was restarted in 2005 and ran till 2010 by the founder Dr. James Frackelton until passed away 11-30-2012. Outgoing mail from the island entered the USPS mail stream by way of Sandusky, Ohio. The RILP lay dormant until life long Port Clinton resident, Dave Gill relaunched the local post with the first new issue on 11-10-2022 of Commercial Vessels servicing the Lake Erie Islands. The next issue "Battle of Lake Erie" is scheduled for 9-10-2023, the 210 year anniversary of the battle. Griffing Flying Services has the RILP contract and is back in Port Clinton, Ohio at the same location as the 1966-1989 local post mail was serviced by.

== Hobbyists' local posts ==
Today's local posters issue their local post "stamps", and issue a variety of commemorative "stamps" covering a wide range of events or personal interests, of subjects that are not normally issued by their own countries' postal services.

In some cases these modern-day local posts have issued stamp subjects before their own country issued the same subject. The Free State Local Post issued an Audie Murphy stamp long before the US Postal Service issued one of the same subject. The Ascension AAF Local Post, located on the island of Ascension in the South Atlantic Ocean, in 1972 commemorated the anniversary of the first aircraft to land at Ascension Island. This same subject was commemorated by the Ascension Island postal system in 1982.

This sort of local post is effectively a "home-brewed" postal system, and the typical hobbyist carries little, if any, mail (though some do carry mail over a short distance for themselves or a few people).

The Local Post Collectors' Society established in 1972, coordinates communication among local posters. The LPCS issues a regular bulletin The Poster to its members around the world, relating stories of local posts, showing new issues and other related items.
