= Rattlesnake Island (Lake Erie) =

Island on Lake Erie, Ohio, United States

Coordinates: 41.6791°N 82.8493°W

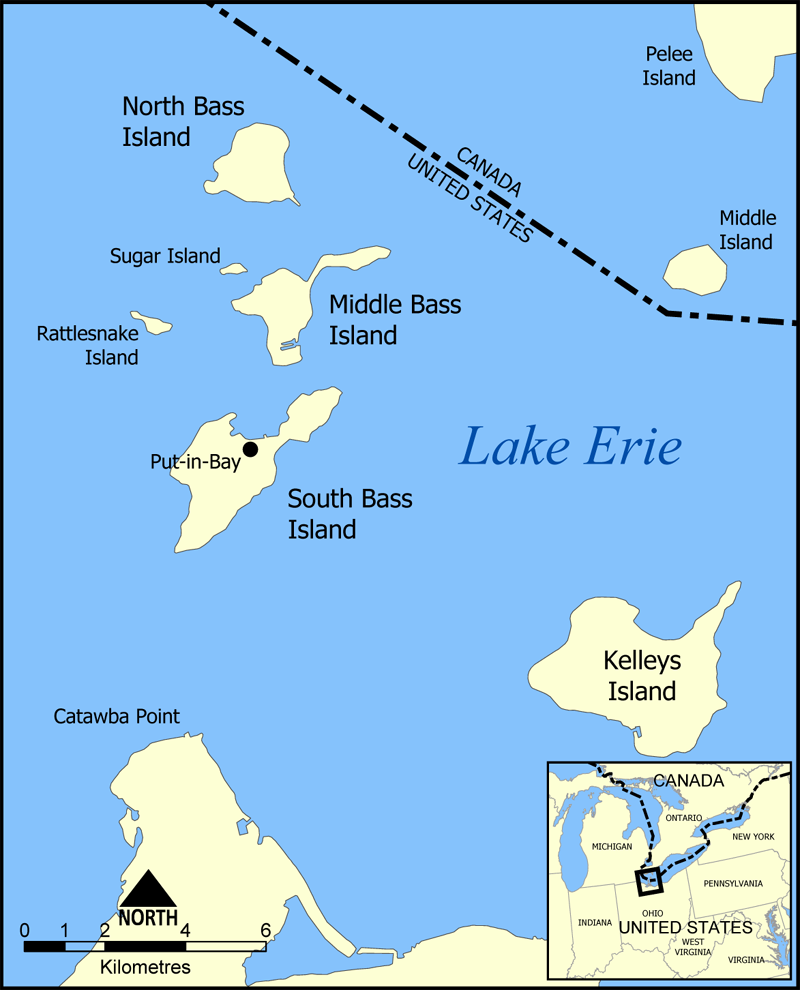
Location of Rattlesnake Island in the Bass Islands

Rattlesnake Island is an 85-acre (34 ha) island located in Lake Erie near South Bass Island, 11 miles (18 km) northeast of Port Clinton, Ohio. It is part of Put-in-Bay Township, in Ottawa County. It is one of several islands known as the Lake Erie Islands. The name Rattlesnake comes from the actual rattlesnakes that formerly inhabited the island (and supposedly also from the overall shape of the island — two small islets near the northern tip were said to resemble a rattlesnake's rattle).

== History ==
During the latter 1700s, the Lake Erie Islands were still part of the Canadian territory (having been claimed for Great Britain by the Governor of Canada, who also named St. George’s Island, when he visited these islands circa-1797). However, the Connecticut Land Company later (circa-1806) surveyed them as being part of the Connecticut Western Reserve; however, none of these Lake Erie islands were ever a part of the Firelands Grant.

Put-in-Bay was a strategic location during the War of 1812, when Oliver Hazard Perry—Commodore of the United States fleet on Lake Erie—rendezvoused with General William Henry Harrison at Sandusky Bay. Following discussions concerning the upcoming campaign, the commanders selected Put-in-Bay harbor for the American naval base. From this strategic location Perry was able to observe British fleet movements, and eventually engaged and defeated them. Perry's victory gave the Americans control of Lake Erie and a relative calm prevailed amongst the islands.

In 1854, Abigail Dunning of Hartford, Connecticut, sold Rattlesnake Island to Horace Kelley of Cleveland, Ohio. Soon thereafter, post offices were established on South Bass Island (1860), North Bass Island (1864), and Middle Bass Island (1864). Rattlesnake Island was largely uninhabited at the time and on June 22, 1861 it became a part of Put-in-Bay Township. For the subsequent two decades, the only known residents of Rattlesnake Island were the David Hammond family (who moved there from Vermilion, Ohio), including several of David’s children who were born on the island.

== Modern history ==
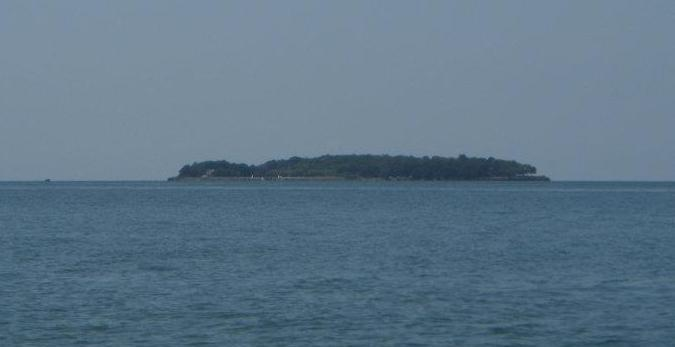
Rattlesnake Island and its "rattles" viewed from South Bass Island.

The modern history of Rattlesnake Island began with the purchase of the island about 1929 by Hubert D. Bennett, the owner of the Toledo Scale Company, who developed the island by putting in a lodge, harbor, and east-west turf landing strip. A second north-south turf landing strip was added in the 1950s by a Catholic order. In 1959, the island was sold to James P. Frackelton, M.D., a Cleveland surgeon and owner of the Cleveland Stamp and Coin Company, and Robert C. Schull, a stockbroker. Frackelton and Schull further developed the island, but economic and market conditions forced the sale of the island in 1989.

Rattlesnake Island then became a private island that was re-sold in 1992 for $4.6 million. Frackelton and sixty-five other investors re-purchased the island in 1999.

Today, Rattlesnake Island is accessible only to the 65 members of the Rattlesnake Island Club. There are currently only about fifteen private and exclusive lots on the island. Sale of property on the island is controlled by the island club.

Most of the members travel to the island to take advantage of the private facilities. In recent years, a second marina was added to the island.

The summer staff, mostly from Eastern Europe, numbers around 25 and there are separate dorms for the employees working there. There is also a year-round caretaker and chef. The island's workers are trained to recognize each of the members and their families both by appearance and by the yacht they come in on. Any non-members will immediately be turned away by armed security guards in one of the island's two boats before the intruders even have time to dock. Because of the secrecy behind the island, many rumors and myths have arisen, including a rumor that criminal organizations use the island as a place to relax. With the tight security, the best place to view the island is atop the Perry's Monument on Put-in-Bay.

In order to join the Island Club, one of the current members must quit, and the potential member must receive recommendations from at least two of the island's current members. The cost to join is estimated to be between $90,000 and $200,000 initially, as well as a monthly maintenance fee.

The reported population as of the 2020 census was approximately (Note: Due to differential privacy, block-level counts in the 2020 Census are not reported precisely.) 1 person.

== Rattlesnake Island local post ==
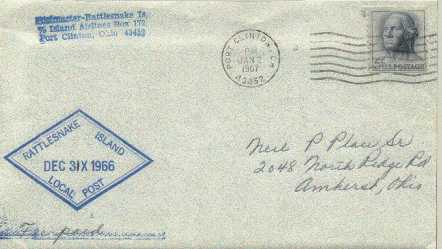
A Rattlesnake Island local post cover of 31 December 1966.

The island operated the only USPS-sanctioned local post in the United States.

For many years, service was provided by way of a Ford Tri-motor which shuttled mail between the island and the mainland. From 1966 to 1989, USPS mail was routed by way of Port Clinton, Ohio. It was restarted in 2005 and ran till 2010 by the founder Dr. James Frackelton until he died on 11-30-2012. Outgoing mail from the island entered the USPS mail stream by way of Sandusky, Ohio. The RILP lay dormant until life-long Port Clinton resident Dave Gill relaunched the local post with the first new issue on 11-10-2022 of Commercial Vessels servicing the Lake Erie Islands. The next issue "Battle of Lake Erie" is scheduled for 9-10-2023, the 210-year anniversary of the battle. Griffing Flying Services has the RILP contract and is back in Port Clinton, Ohio at the same location as the 1966-1989 local post mail was serviced by Island Airlines.

The stamps of Rattlesnake Island Local Post appear in the 2017 Edition of Phillips' Modern US Local Posts CD Catalog.
