= Starve Island =

Island in the United States of America

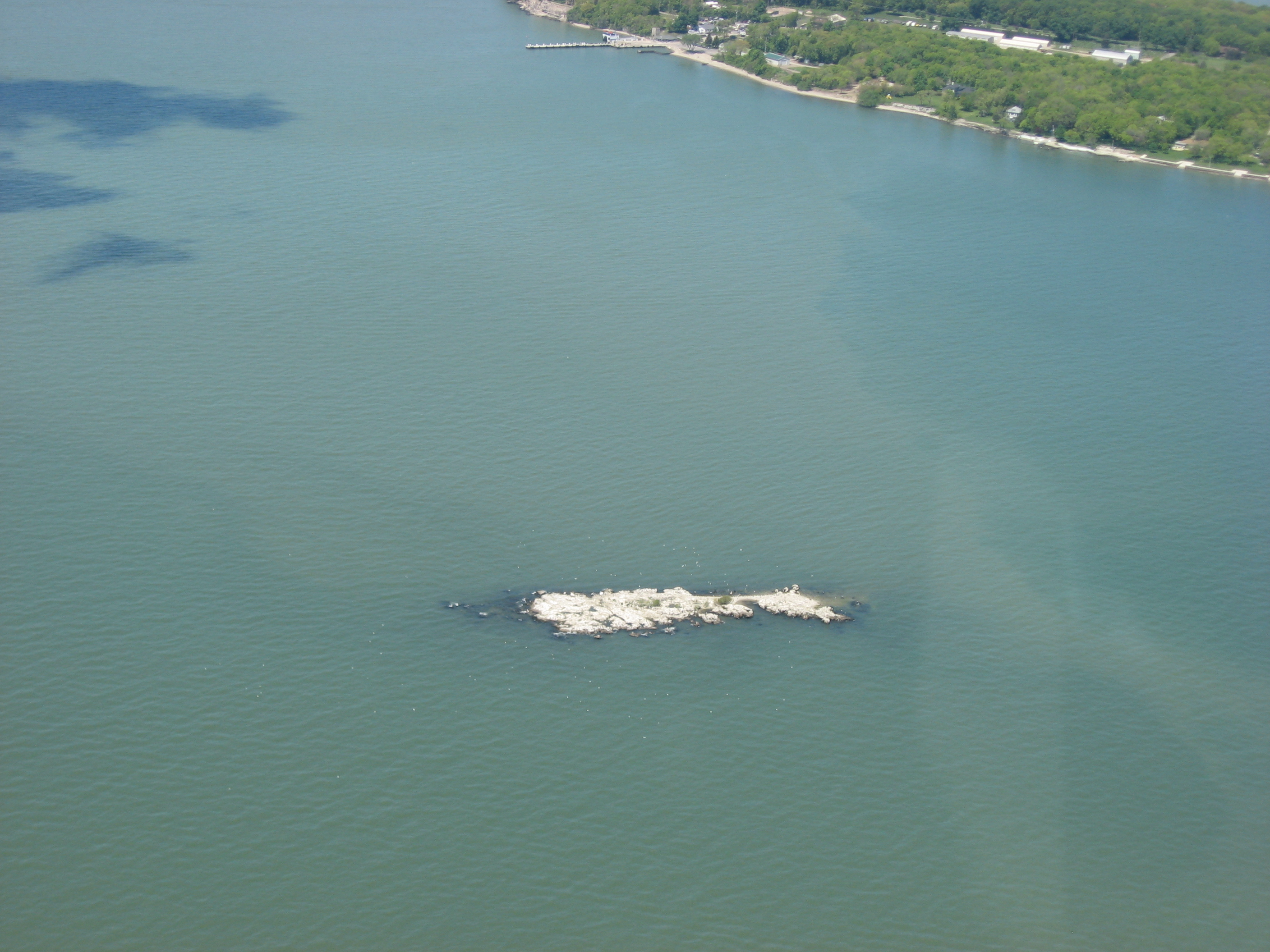
Starve Island from the air

Starve Island is an island of the U.S. state of Ohio located in Lake Erie. The 2-acre (0.81 ha) island is about a mile (1.6 km) south of South Bass Island. In normal weather conditions it is visible for only a mile or two, as some rocks and a few shrubs poking up from the lake, and is the second smallest of the Lake Erie Islands (the smallest is Turtle Island). The island can be seen from the top of Perry's Victory and International Peace Memorial in Put-in-Bay.

It is said that the island gets its name from a sailor's fate upon the island following a shipwreck. Variant names for the island include Dinner Island and Glacial Island.

The Starve Island Reef is located approximately one mile further south of Starve Island at 41°36′46″N 82°48′56″W. Island and reef are both located in Put-in-Bay Township, Ottawa County, Ohio.
