= Buckeye Island =

Island in Lake Erie, Ohio, US

Coordinates: 41.6648°N 82.7904°W

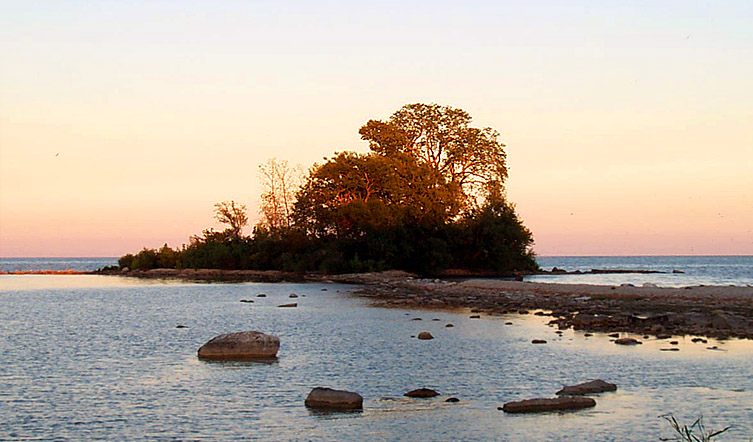
Buckeye Island from the ground

Buckeye Island is a small island of the U.S. state of Ohio, in Lake Erie. It is located just off shore of the northeast tip of South Bass Island, Ohio, in Put-in-Bay Township, Ottawa County. It was seasonally populated early in the 20th century. The island was noted for the Willow trees found there. It is privately owned, and has been by the same family since 1916.

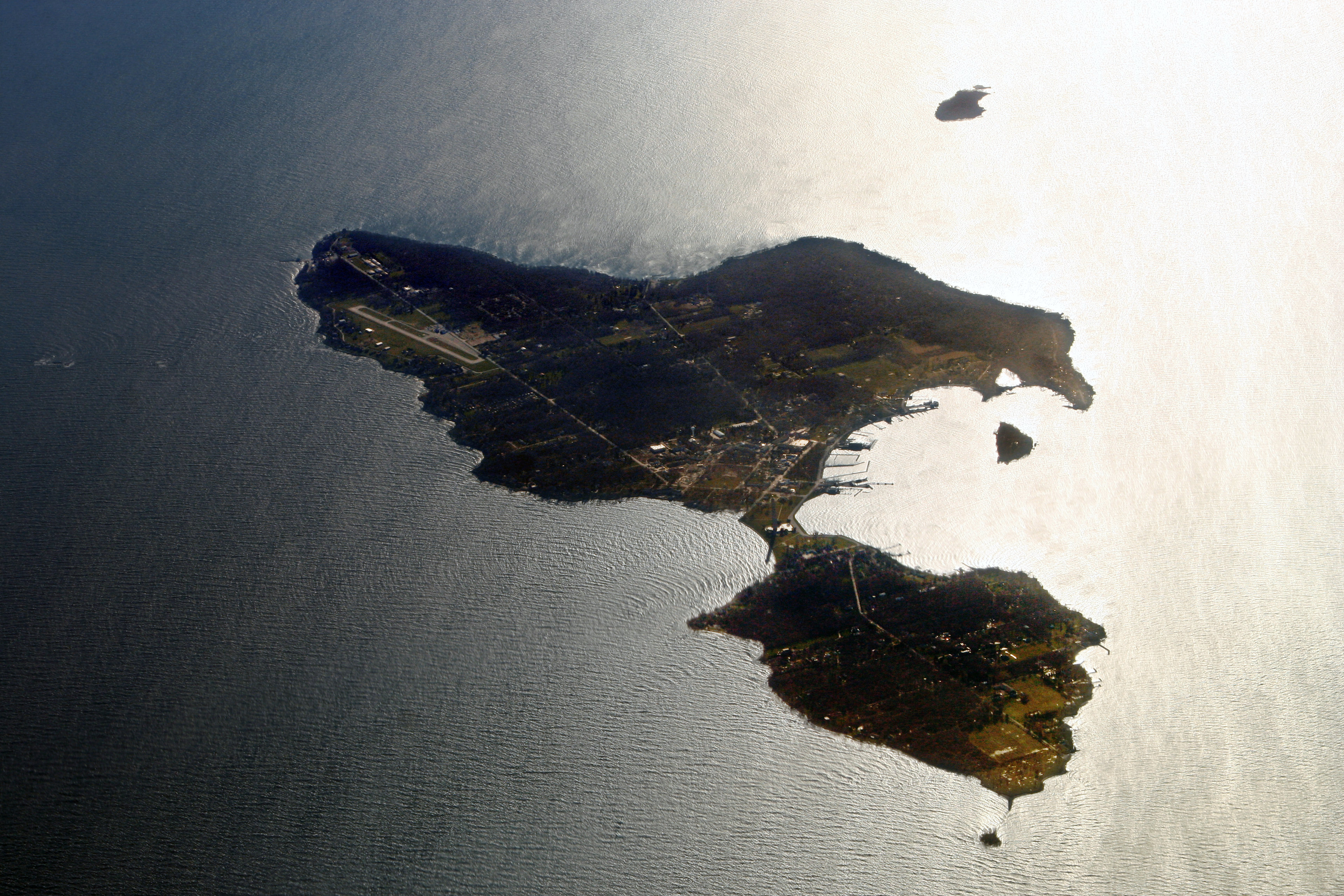
South Bass Island, Ohio from the air, looking west. Buckeye Island can be seen at the bottom of the image (the very small island just off the coast of South Bass Island).

It is sometimes labeled as "Buckeye Point".
