= Mouse Island (Ohio) =

- Private Island
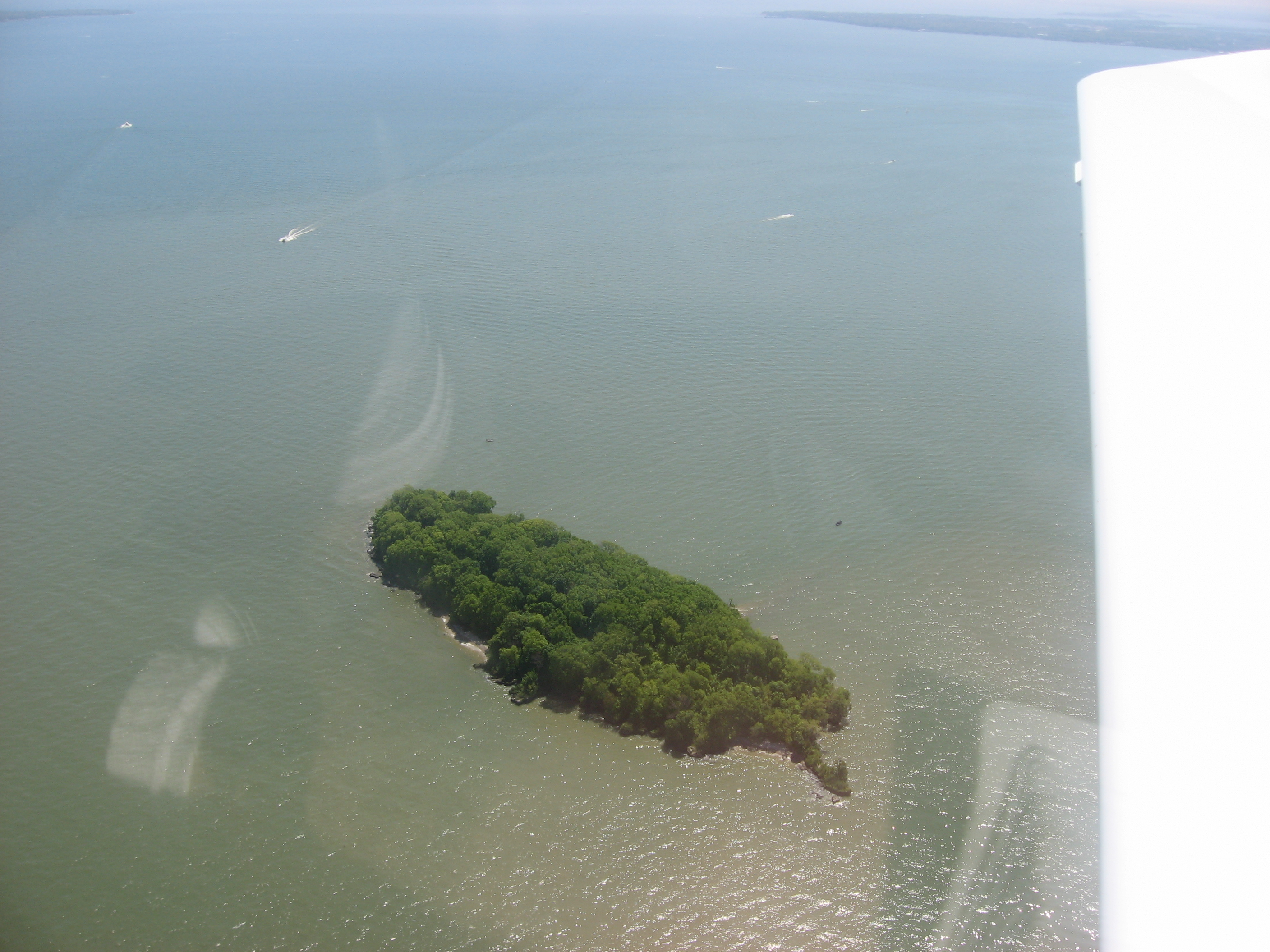

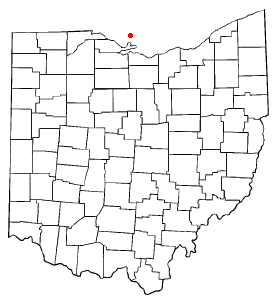

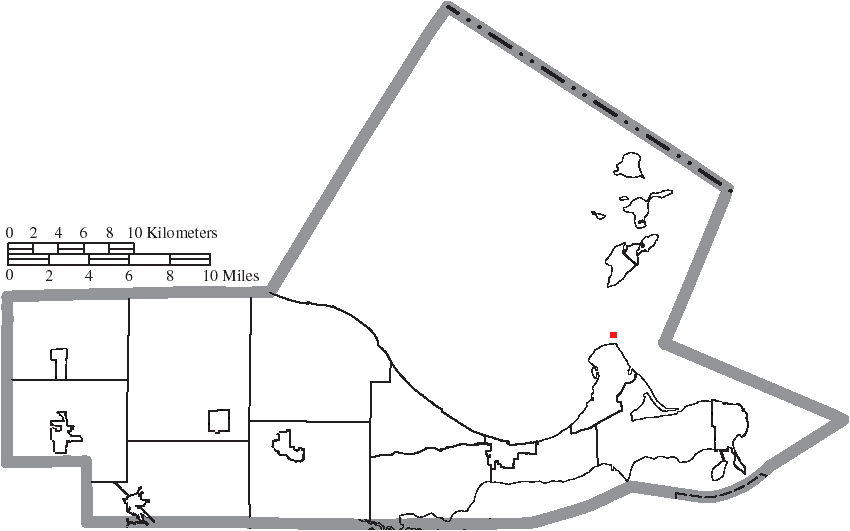
- Coordinates: 41°35′28.8″N 82°49′57.8″W

Area
  - Total: 2.8 ha (7 acres)

Mouse Island is a seven acre private island located in Lake Erie off the northern tip of Catawba Point in Ottawa County, Ohio, United States, near the city of Sandusky (41°35′28″N 82°49′59″W). It was formerly named "Ship Island", as denoted on early-19th-Century maps (and in some late-18th-Century documents). It was later named Mouse Island for its small size. It is part of Catawba Island Township.

The island was once owned by the American president Rutherford B. Hayes. The Hayes family built two small cabins, a hand ferry to the shore, a tennis court and supplied the island with running water. In the 1930s the island fell into disuse and all amenities were destroyed by fire or neglect. The Hayes family owned the property until 1966 as none of the former president's grandchildren remained in the area. Remains of the structures can still be found on the island today – including the native stone chimneys of the summer cabins as well as part of the foundation.

The Island is privately owned and is not open for public visitation. The island was owned by the Mercer family of Rocky River, Ohio, from 1966 to 2024. A limestone reef between the island and shoreline presents a safety hazard for watercraft that draw more than 3 feet. On January 11, 2026, local news reported the island was listed for sale for $5,000,000.
