= Ballast Island =

Ballast Island may refer to:

- Ballast Island (Lake Erie)
- Ballast Island (Japan)
- Ballast Island (Seattle)
