= Ballast Island (Japan) =

Uninhabited Japanese island in the Yaeyama chain

Native name: Barasu-shima (バラス島)
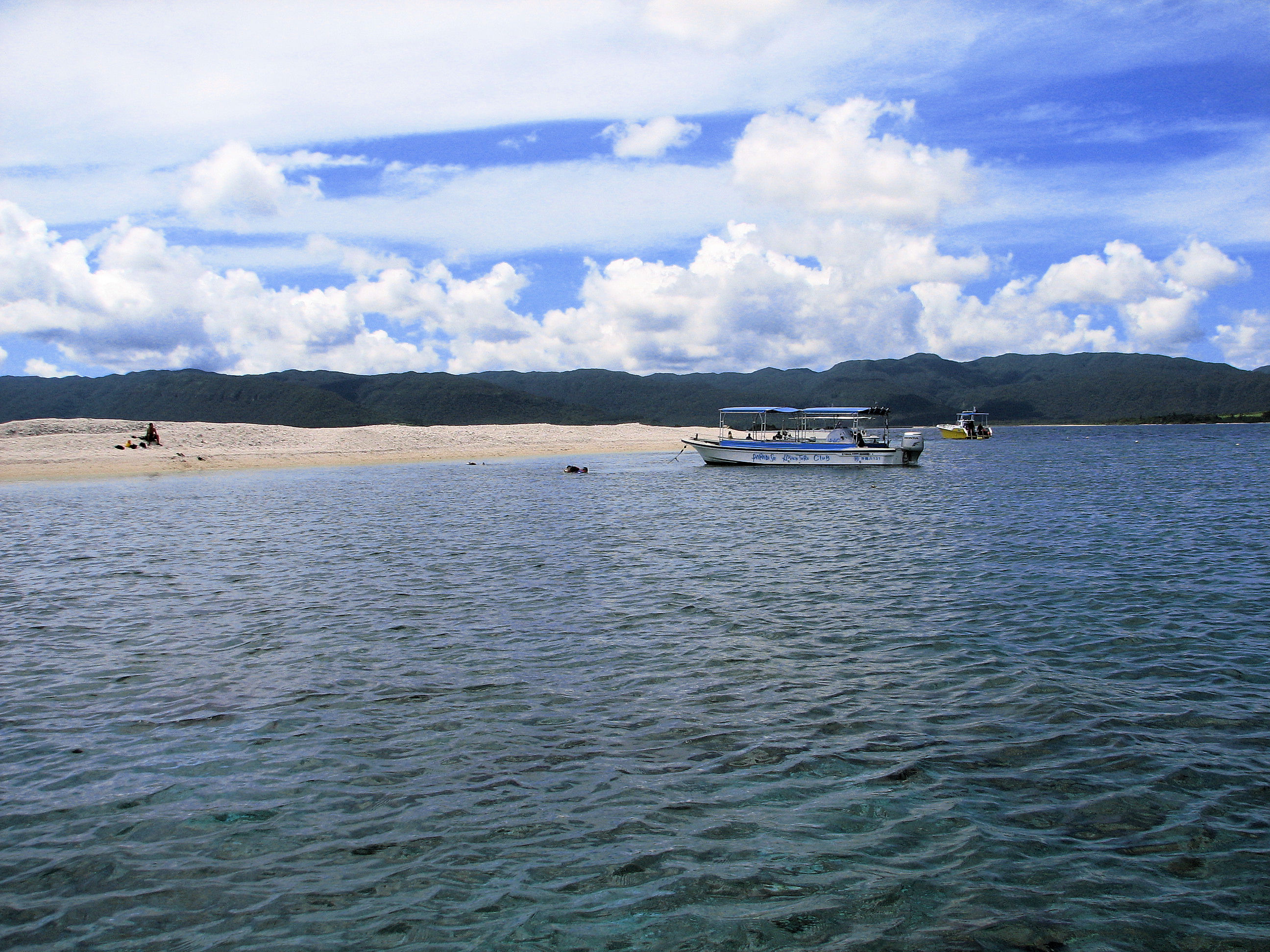
- Boats at Ballast Island, 2007
- Interactive map of Ballast Island

Geography
- Location: East China Sea
- Coordinates: 24°26′5″N 123°49′1″E
- Archipelago: Ryukyu Islands; Yaeyama Islands
- Area: 2,000–2,400 m^{2} (22,000–26,000 sq ft)

Administration
- Japan
- Prefecture: Okinawa
- District: Yaeyama
- Town: Taketomi

Ballast Island, also known as Barasu Island (Japanese: バラス島, romanized: Barasu-shima), is a small uninhabited coral island or cay in the Yaeyama chain off the coast of mainland Japan, located between the islands of Iriomote and Hatoma. The island sits at the center of a coral reef composed primarily of species of the stony coral genus Acropora, most numerously Acropora muricata. At least four goby species have been found at the island, as well as a specimen of the moray eel Gymnothorax ryukyuensis.

Two small islets on the site had formed by the 1960s. A mass bleaching of the reef's corals from July to September 1998 led to the merging of the two islets, accelerated by the impact of several typhoons in 1998 and 1999. Ballast Island reached a maximum land area of around 10,000–20,000 square metres (2.5–4.9 acres) in late 1999, before steadily declining over the following years. As of 2016, the island had a surface area of around 2,000–2,400 square metres (0.5–0.6 acres), a size it has maintained since 2009. While uninhabited, the island is visited on snorkeling tours departing from Iriomote, allowing access to the surrounding coral reefs.

== Geography ==
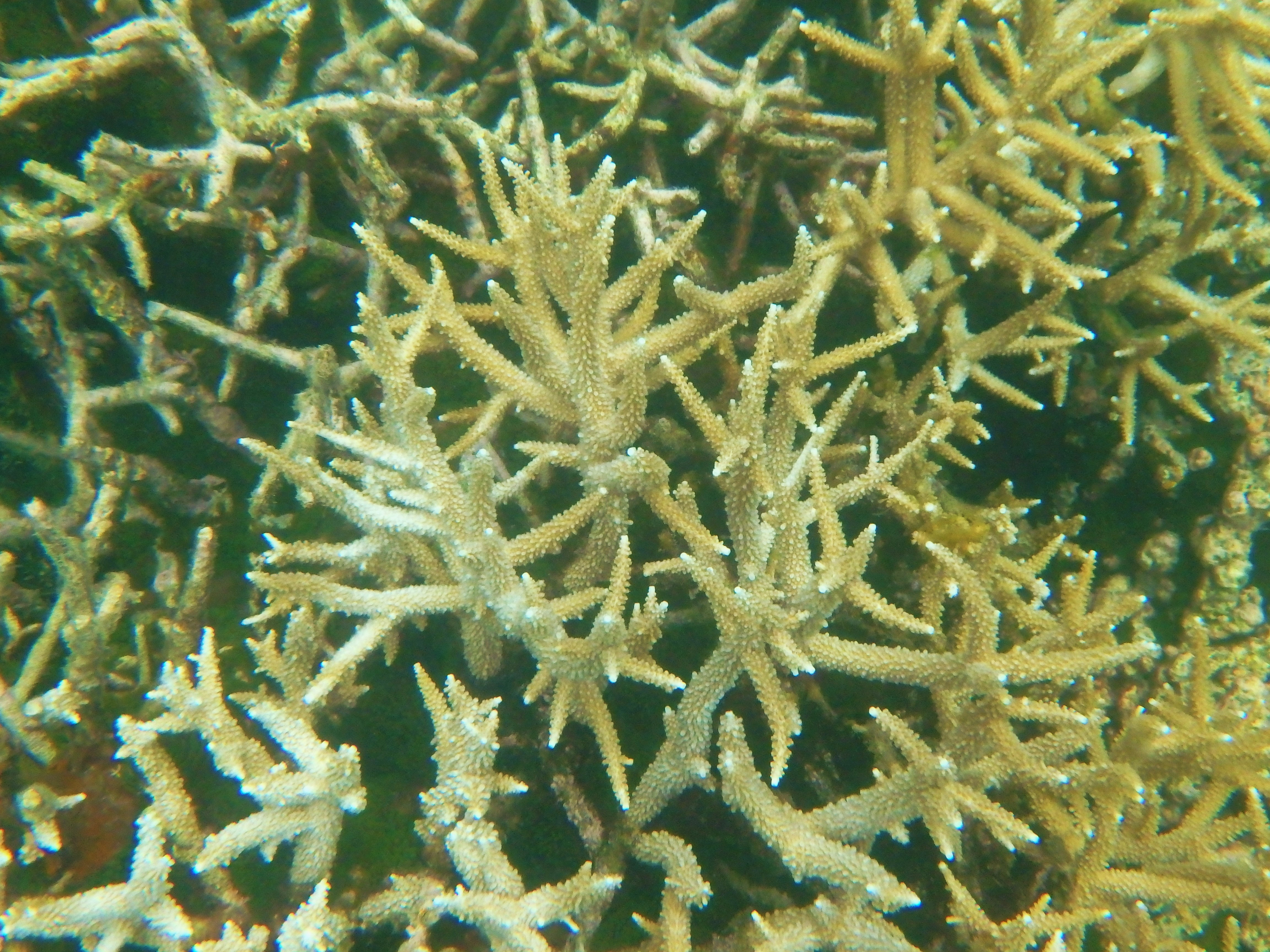
Acropora muricata from the Bonin Islands

Ballast Island is a small cay in the Yaeyama Islands, lying at the center of an isolated coral reef. The island measures approximately 200 meters (660 ft) in length, and ranges between 20–30 meters (66–98 ft) in width. The island lies south of Hatoma and approximately 2.5 kilometres (1.6 miles) northeast of the coast of Iriomote. As of 2016, the island measures 2,000–2,400 square metres (0.5–0.6 acres) in area.

== Biology ==
=== Coral ===
The island is primarily composed of more than 90% coral gravel, mainly branch particulates from the stony coral genus Acropora, with fragments reaching sizes of up to 10 centimetres (4 in). The reef on which Ballast Island sits, described as "butterfly-shaped", stretches 300–600 meters (980–1,970 ft) from Ballast Island's shoreline. The edges of the reef have the greatest density of coral, featuring various Acropora species. On the eastern side of the reef, Acropora muricata covers around 40% of the surface, with smaller amounts covered by the species A. hyacinthus, A. cytherea, and A. intermedia. On the western side of the reef, A. intermedia, A. muricata, and A. aspera make up the majority of reef cover.

=== Fish ===
Multiple species of fish are known from Ballast Island. A holotype and several paratypes of the goby Gobiodon aoyagii were collected at the island throughout the 1990s, alongside specimens of Gobiodon erythrospilus and Cabillus pexus. A paratype of Eviota filamentosa, the threadfin dwarfgoby, was found at the eastern reef. An individual of the moray eel species Gymnothorax ryukyuensis was found at Ballast Island in 1982.

== History ==
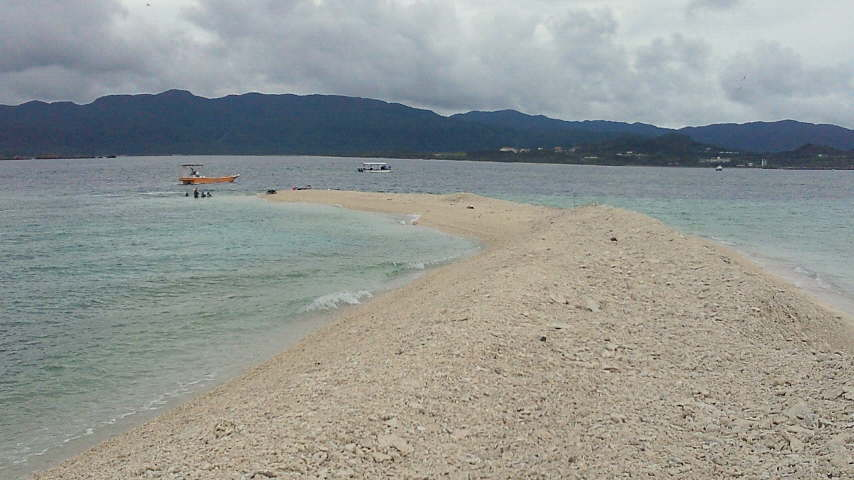
Ballast Island, 2011

Local accounts describe islands existing at its present location since at least the 1960s, although subject to considerable changes in shape and terrain due to typhoons and the yearly monsoons. Ballast Island was initially divided into two smaller islets in an east–west arrangement, with a combined land area ranging from 470–2,700 square metres (5,100–29,100 sq ft). The name Ballast Island refers to the island's gravelly composition, resembling ships' ballast.

A large-scale bleaching event struck the reef's corals from July to September 1998, leading to the accumulation of dead coral over the following seasons. The land area above water rose sharply by early 1999 as two smaller islets coalesced to form Ballast Island. Three typhoons in 1998 and 1999 may have contributed to the rapid accumulation of coral on the island. The island reached its largest size in November 1999, around 10,000–20,000 square metres (2.5–4.9 acres), before steadily declining in area over the following years. The island had declined to around 5,400–7,700 square metres (1.3–1.9 acres) by 2001, likely due to sediment dispersal in the surrounding water. It maintained an area ranging from 4,700–7,700 square metres (1.2–1.9 acres) throughout the 2000s, before declining to 2,000–2,400 square metres (0.5–0.6 acres) in 2009, remaining around this size since.

Snorkeling tours, departing from Iriomote, take place around Ballast Island and Hatoma.
