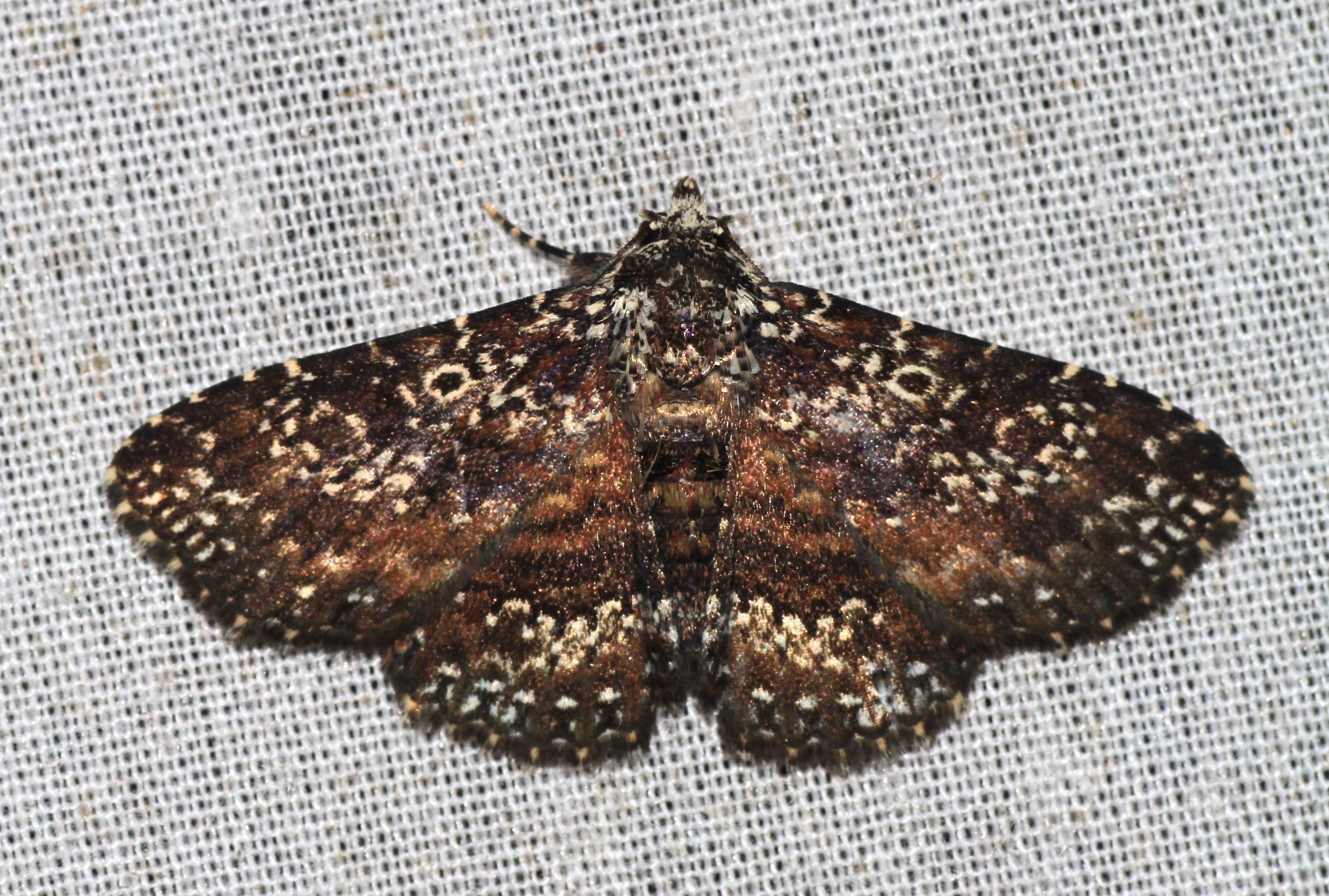

Scientific classification
- Kingdom: Animalia
- Phylum: Arthropoda
- Clade: Pancrustacea
- Class: Insecta
- Order: Lepidoptera
- Superfamily: Noctuoidea
- Family: Erebidae
- Genus: Caduca
- Species: C. albopunctata

Binomial name
- Caduca albopunctata Walker, [1857]

Synonyms
- Homoptera albopunctata Walker, 1858; Alamis meleagris Felder & Rogenhofer, 1874; Diomea nasea Swinhoe, 1918

= Caduca albopunctata =

Species of moth

Caduca albopunctata is a moth of the family Noctuidae first described by Francis Walker in 1857.

== Distribution ==
It is found in Sri Lanka, the Indian subregion, Taiwan, Thailand, Sundaland and Japan's Iriomote Island and Ishigaki Island.

== Description ==
The wings are dark blackish brown and fasciated with several series of small white spots.

== Subspecies ==
Two subspecies are recognized.

- Caduca albopunctata albopunctata Walker, 1857
- Caduca albopunctata phronimus Rothschild, 1920
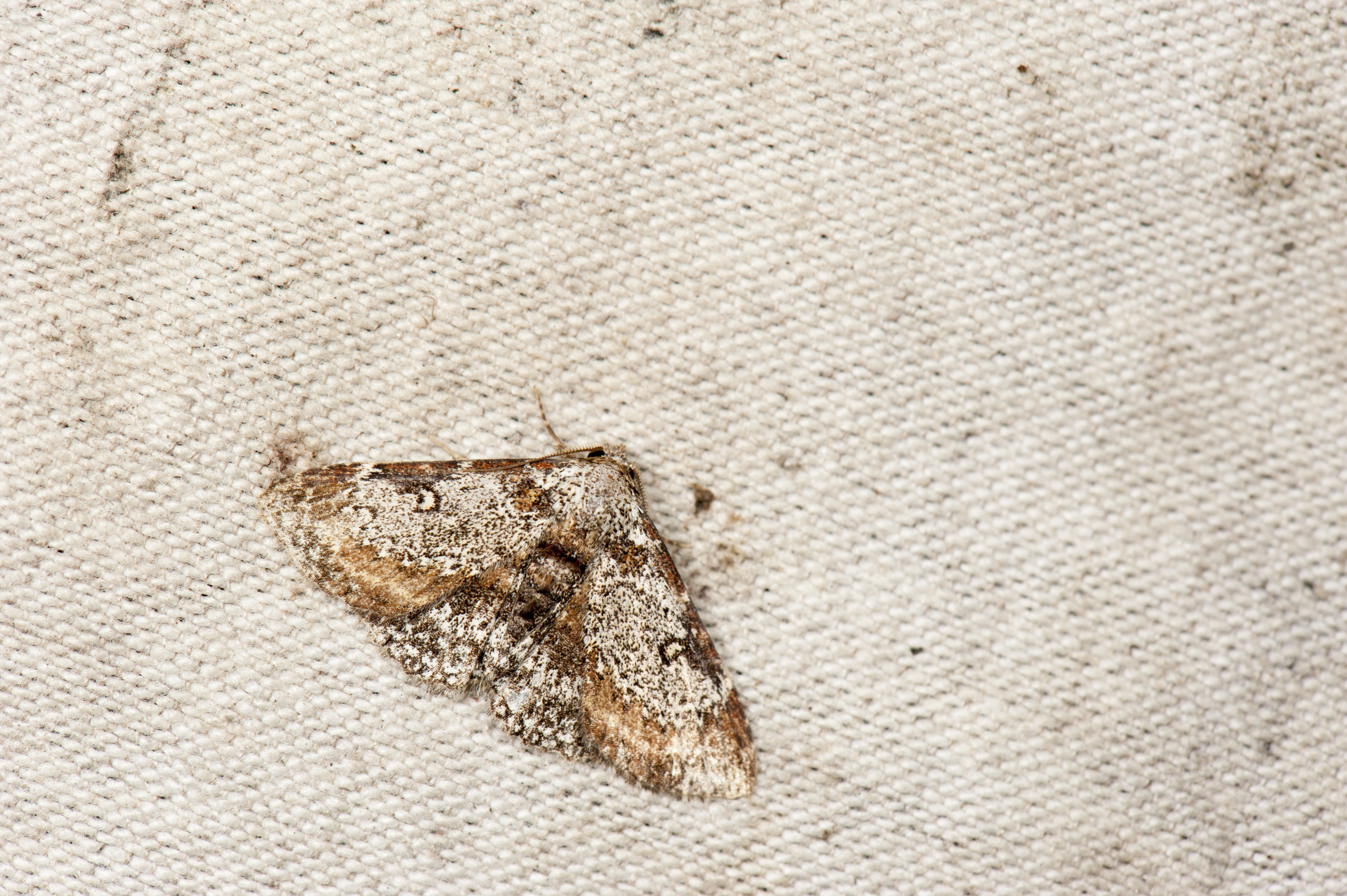

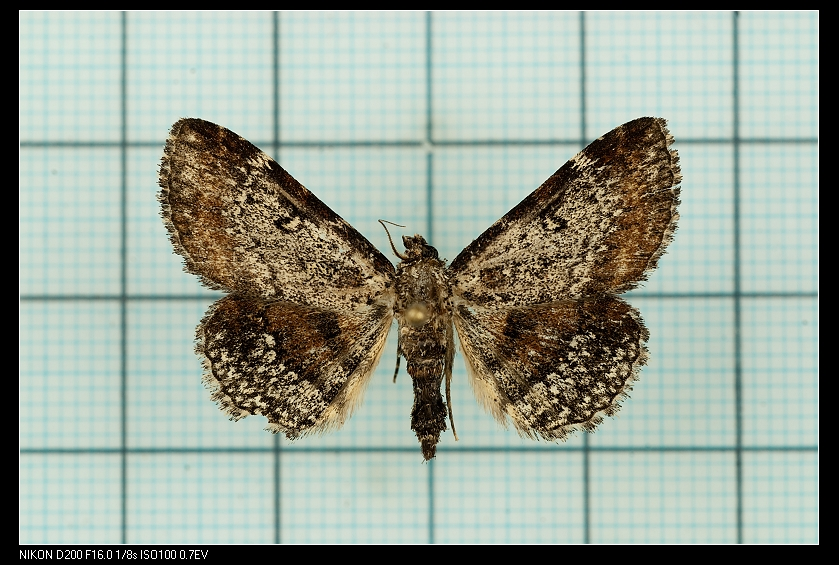

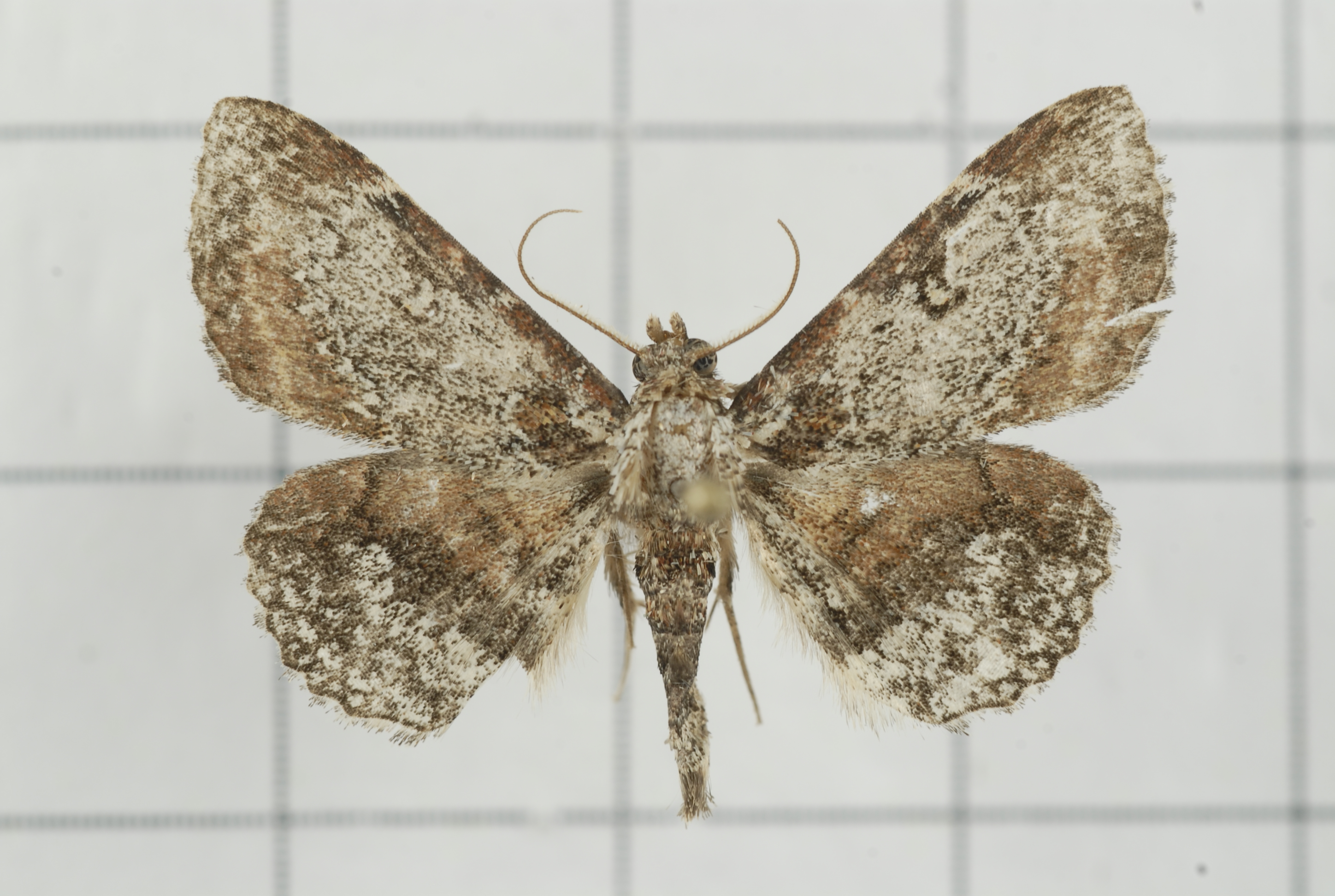

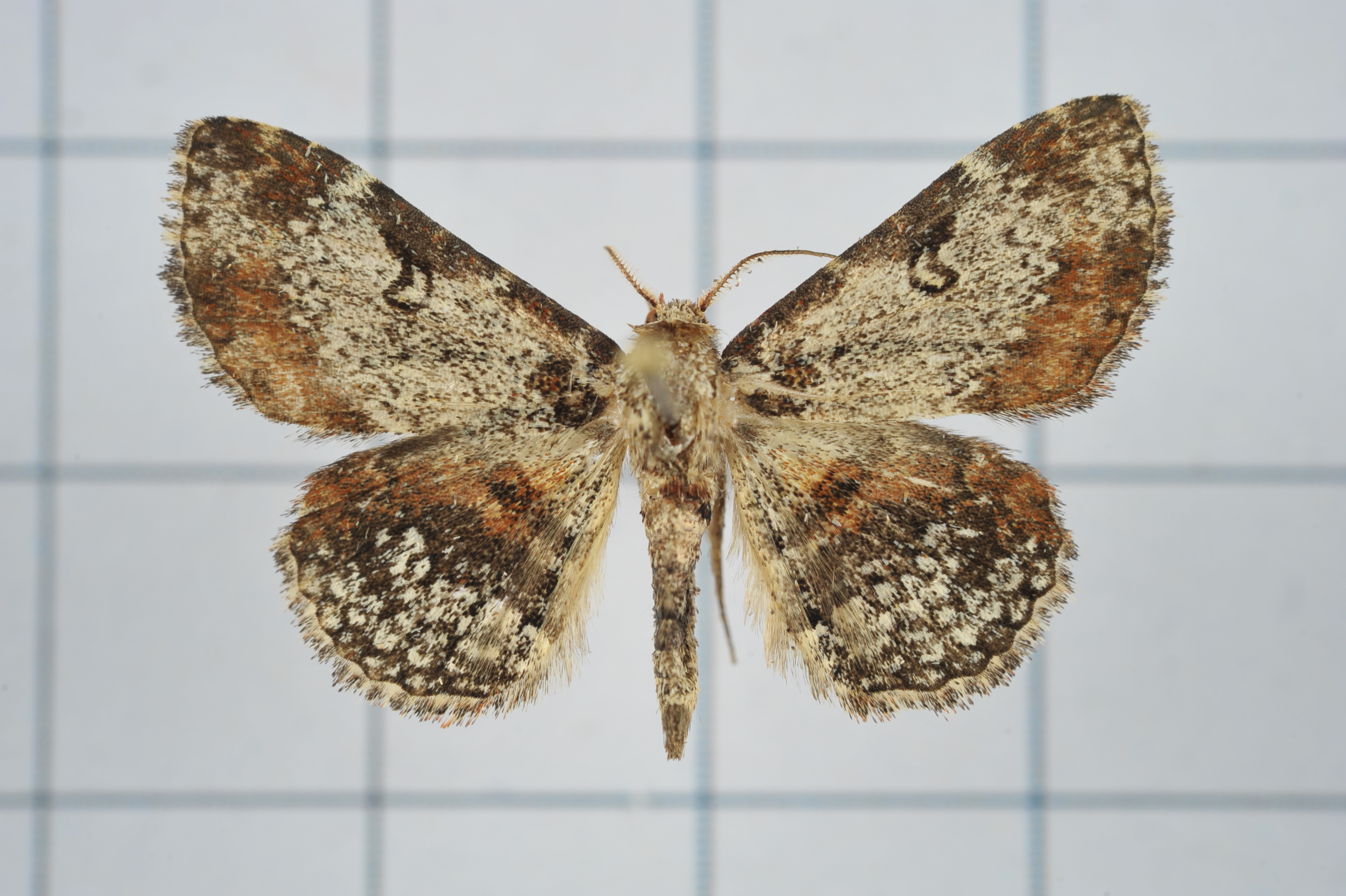

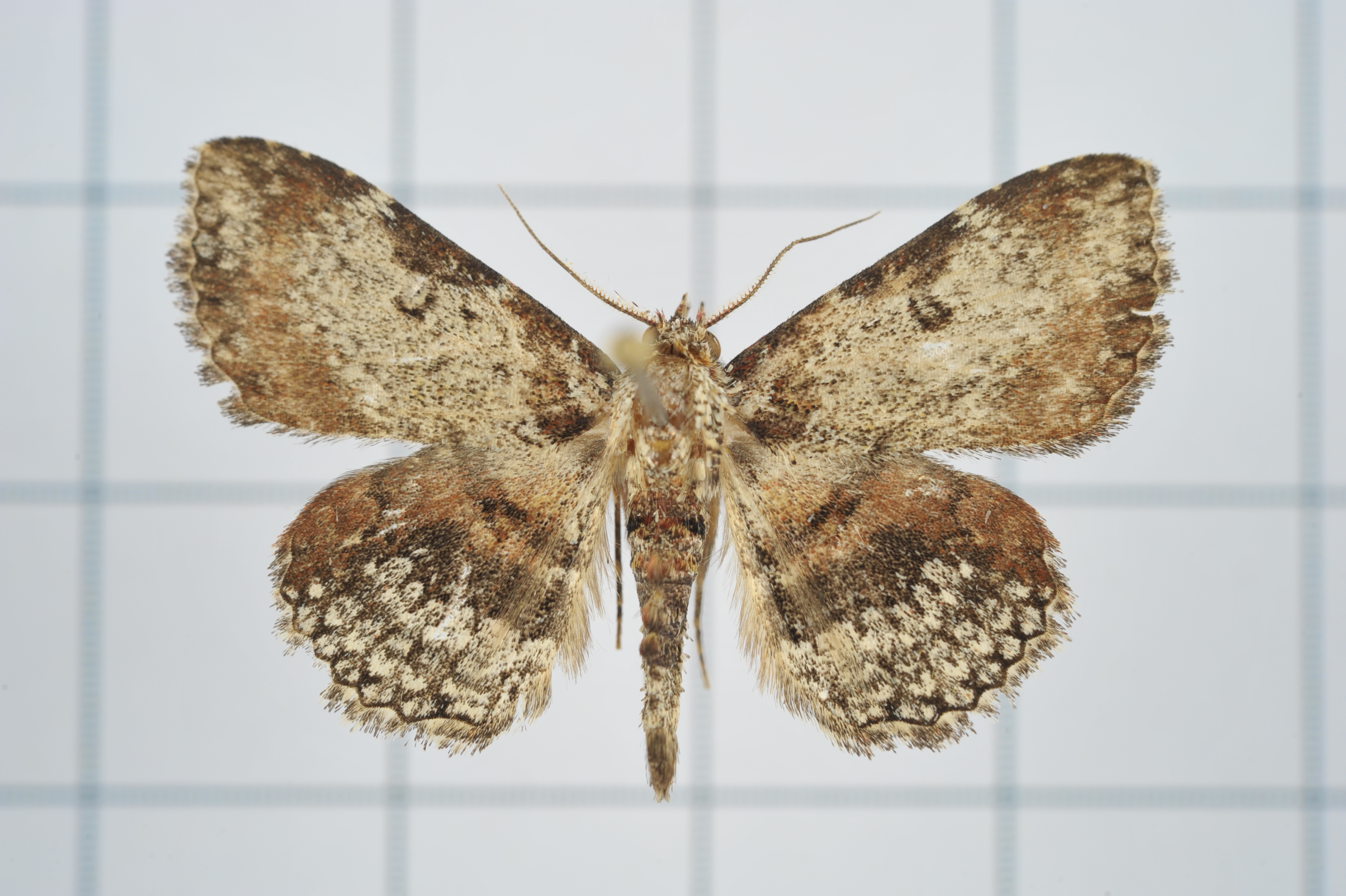
