= Acropora teres =

Conservation status
- Data Deficient (IUCN 3.1)

Scientific classification
- Kingdom: Animalia
- Phylum: Cnidaria
- Subphylum: Anthozoa
- Class: Hexacorallia
- Order: Scleractinia
- Family: Acroporidae
- Genus: Acropora
- Species: A. teres

Binomial name
- Acropora teres (Verrill, 1866)

Species of coral

Acropora teres is a species of acroporid coral found in the central Indo-Pacific, Southeast Asia, Japan, the East China Sea and the oceanic western Pacific Ocean. It is found in tropical shallow reefs on slopes and in lagoons, at depths of between 2 and 20 metres (6 ft 7 in and 65 ft 7 in). The taxonomic status of this species is uncertain. It was described as Madrepora teres by Verrill in 1866.

== Description ==
It occurs in arborescent colonies containing a number of twisted branches. Its branches sometimes divide and contain axial and radial corallites. The radial corallites are immersed in the branches and are small, and have circular openings. It has small axial corallites. The species is white in colour and has a similar appearance to Acropora abrolhosensis and Acropora formosa.

== Distribution ==
It is classed as a data deficient species on the IUCN Red List, but it is believed that its population is decreasing in line with the global decline of coral reefs, and it is listed under Appendix II of CITES. Figures of its population are unknown, but is likely to be threatened by the global reduction of coral reefs, the increase of temperature causing coral bleaching, climate change, human activity, the crown-of-thorns starfish (Acanthaster planci) and disease. It occurs in the central Indo-Pacific, southeast Asia, Japan, the East China Sea and the oceanic western Pacific Ocean. It is found at depths of between 2 and 20 metres (6 ft 7 in and 65 ft 7 in) in tropical shallow reefs on slopes and in lagoons.

== Taxonomy ==
It was described as Madrepora teres by Verrill in 1866. The taxonomic status of it is currently uncertain.
