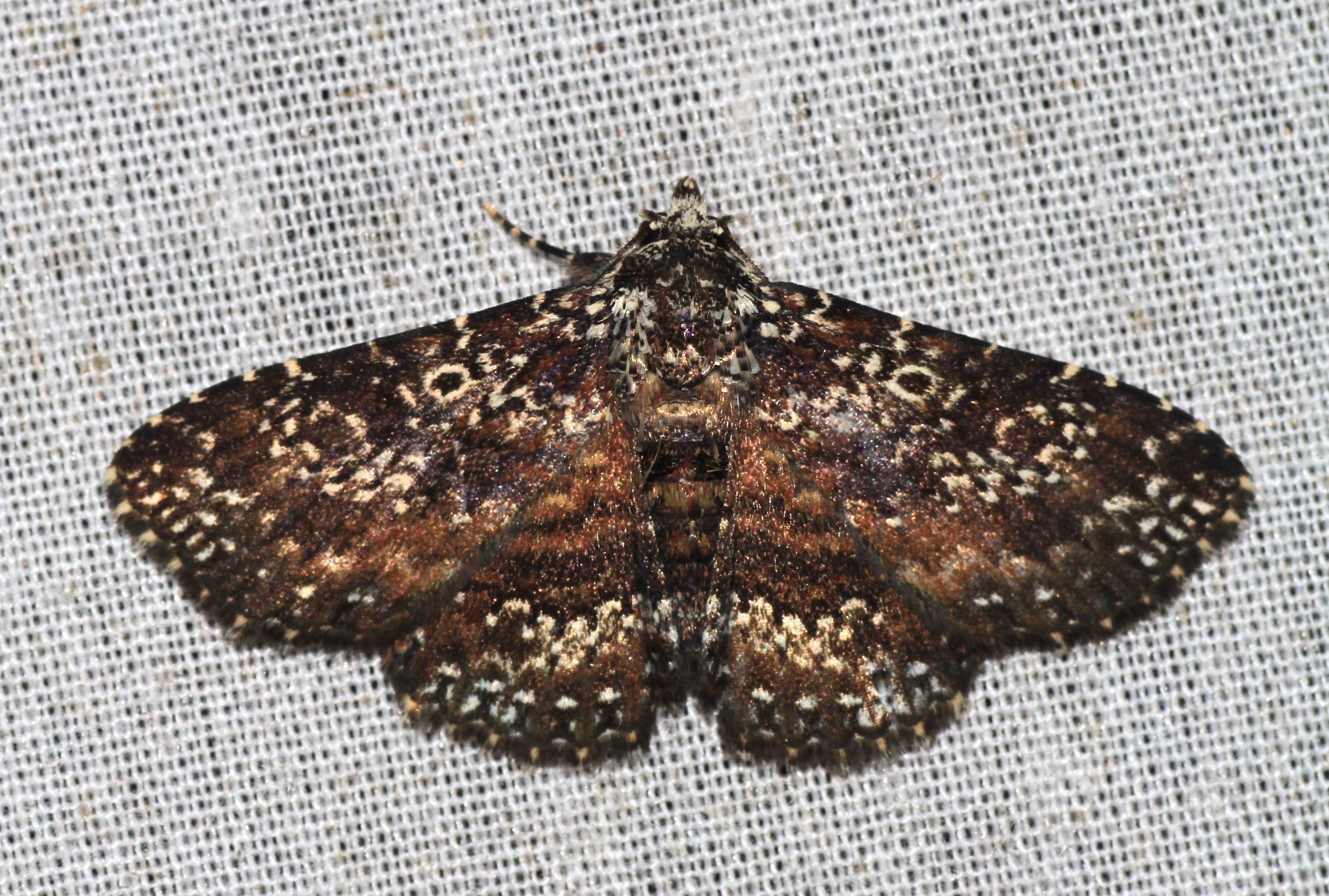
- Caduca albopunctata

Scientific classification
- Domain: Eukaryota
- Kingdom: Animalia
- Phylum: Arthropoda
- Class: Insecta
- Order: Lepidoptera
- Superfamily: Noctuoidea
- Family: Erebidae
- Subfamily: Calpinae
- Genus: Caduca; Moore, 1885

= Caduca =

Genus of moths

Caduca is a genus of moths of the family Noctuidae.

== Species ==
- Caduca albopunctata (Walker, 1858)
