= Ballast Island (Seattle) =

Former island in Washington state, US

- U.S. National Register of Historic Places
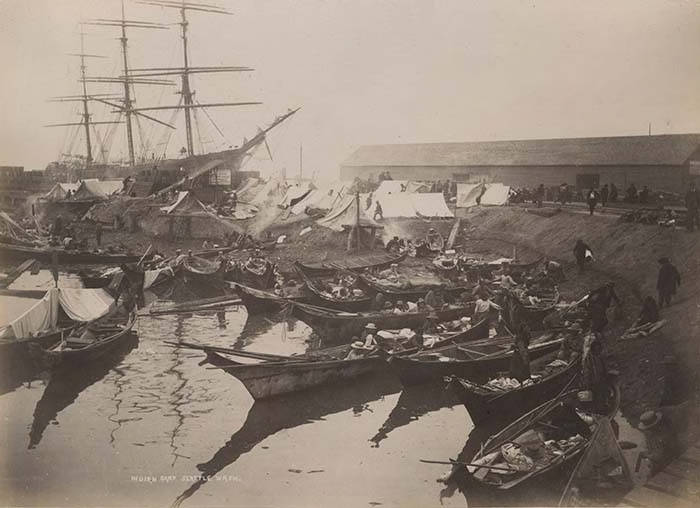
- Native American camp on Ballast Island, c. 1890
- Location: Central Waterfront, Seattle, Washington, US
- Coordinates: 47°36′02″N 122°20′10″W
- Area: 2.91 acres (1.18 ha)
- Built: c. 1880
- Demolished: 1898
- NRHP reference No.: 100006067
- Added to NRHP: January 27, 2021

Ballast Island was a small artificial island located on the Seattle Waterfront during the late 1800s. Frequent illegal dumping of ballast led to the designation of a specific region of the Seattle harbor where dumping was permitted. Emerging above the surface around 1880, it grew rapidly following additional dock developments in 1881 which largely encircled the island. It became an encampment site and refuge for Native American migrant workers from across the North Pacific coast, many of whom were employed seasonally as hop pickers. They were later joined by refugees of the city's indigenous Duwamish, following the destruction of a West Seattle village by white vigilantes. It additionally became a beacon for tourists, interested in seeing the native camps.

Although encampments were more tolerated on the island than in other areas in the city, the native workers were increasingly viewed as squatters by local press. The Seattle Police Department repeatedly attempted to evict the occupants of the island during the 1890s, although were only able to clear the island for limited periods. Dock, road, and warehouse expansion ended native residence on the island in 1898. The island was eventually subsumed by fill during rail expansion in the 1900s, with much of the former island now lying several meters beneath various modern developments, including Alaskan Way. The boring of the SR 99 tunnel raised concerns that the site of the island would be disturbed, although state archaeological testing later confirmed that the island was not impacted by the project. It was listed on the National Register of Historic Places in 2021.

== Formation ==
During much of the 19th century, merchant ships arriving at Seattle docked along the coast of Elliott Bay, dumping their stabilizing ballast, often rocks or bricks, along the bay before loading cargo. Initially prohibited, the necessity of unloading ballast led to the designation of an offshore location south of Yesler Wharf as a dumping site. Some sources describe the decision to locate the ballast dump adjacent to the Yesler Wharf as an attempt to protect the wharf from shipworms. Beginning with Henry Yesler's sawmill in 1854, waterfront companies also began dumping waste material into the water, using the piled debris for land reclamation.

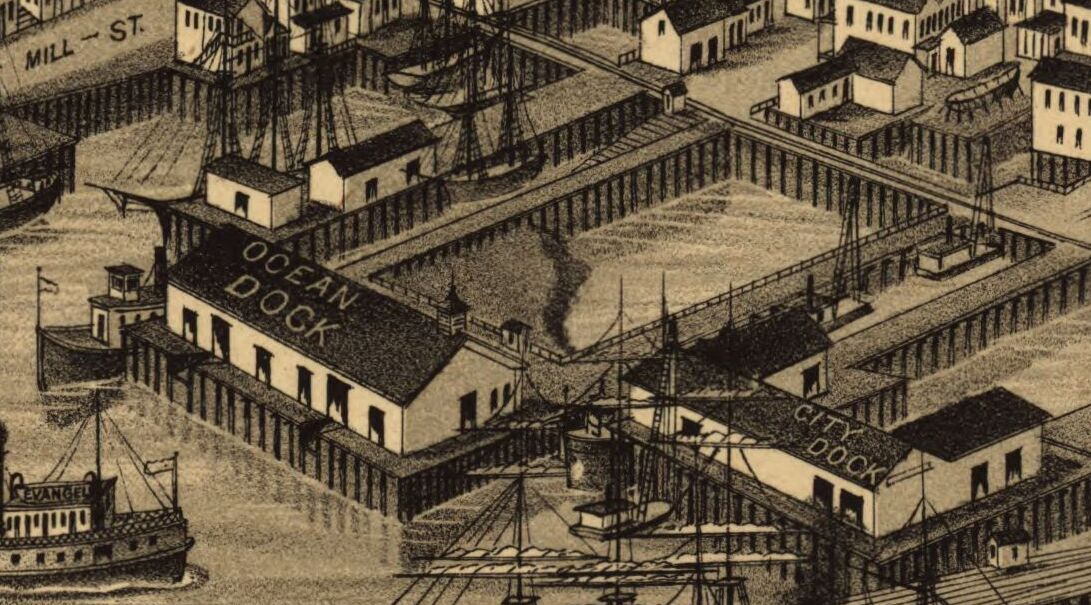
Ballast Island as depicted in an 1884 map of Seattle, shown enclosed by the OIC's Ocean Dock and City Dock

The pile of ballast began to emerge above the surface c. 1880, forming an artificial islet dubbed Ballast Island. The Oregon Improvement Company's (OIC) construction of two large docks near the site greatly accelerated this process, with dockworkers discarding hundreds of tons of ballast into the water below. The expanding island of ballast was largely enclosed by the OIC's Ocean and City Docks, and became accessible only by canoe, with visitors paddling between the dock's supports.

The ballast material comprising the island included various forms of transported rocks such as sandstone cobbles, bricks, slag, schist, and granite. Mainly in the form of stones, particulates within the island ranged in size from sand to large boulders. Looser material such as sand, dirt, and sawdust was heaped atop the island. The surface reached several feet above the waterline. Telegraph Hill, San Francisco became a perennial source of ballast for Seattle-bound ships, due to the frequency of trade between Seattle and San Francisco during the period. In a 1936 history of Seattle, J. Willis Sayre described the sources of the ballast as including Valparaíso, Sydney, Boston, and Liverpool. This description, while impossible to verify, became frequently quoted in later histories of the city.

== Native encampment ==
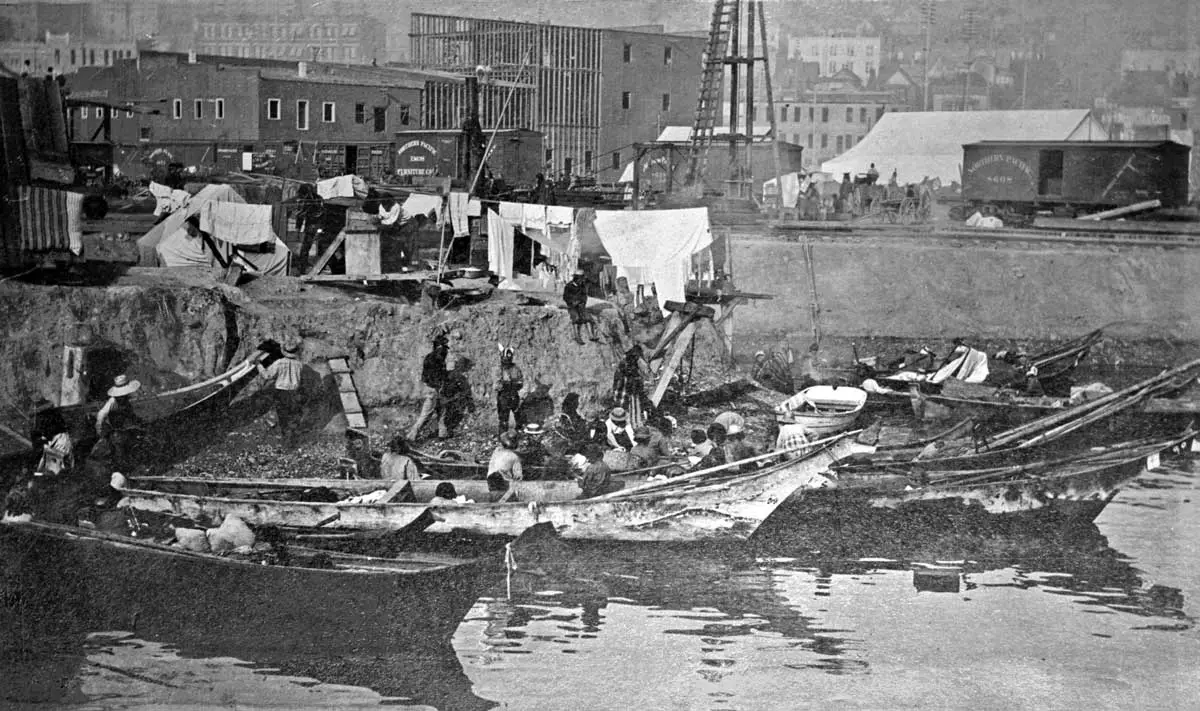
Native canoes at Ballast Island, c. 1890

By the mid-1800s, significant numbers of Native American migrant workers had begun regular travel to the southern Puget Sound. They frequently camped in settlements along the Seattle waterfront during the 1860s and 70s. Worker camps emerged on Ballast Island soon after the island's creation, with residents sleeping in tents or canoes. While they were initially largely employed by sawmills, hop farming gained increasing primacy throughout the 1880s and 90s. Workers would typically stay on the island for several days to share news and trade goods, before traveling by rail to inland hop farms during the summer harvests. Itinerant native tradesmen would also visit the island to sell seafood and various handmade wares. Although likely initially limited to regional Coast Salish peoples, they were later joined at the site by seasonal migrants from British Columbia and Alaska. Before the mid-19th century, these northern nations had regularly conducted slave raids in the Puget Sound, but instead adopted migrant labor to fund potlatch ceremonies.

Descriptions of the island were primarily limited to local newspapers, with the island first mentioned offhand in a November 1882 issue of the Post-Intelligencer. Native settlement on the island was initially treated as a novelty or romanticized, frequently attracting tourists and journalists to the island to see the Native residents, seen in popular thought as the last of a vanishing race of people.

The 1889 Great Seattle Fire did not spread to Ballast Island, but destroyed the adjacent Oregon Improvement Company docks, later rebuilt at a larger scale. By 1890, native settlement on Ballast Island began to take a more permanent character. After repeated pressure by the Seattle Chief of Police to remove the native residents, the OIC ordered their eviction in late January 1890, giving less than a week to leave the island. The Seattle Police evicted attempted native camps on the island over the following months, and sheds were erected by rail workers. However, eviction enforcement quickly ceased, and by the fall of 1890 returning hop pickers re-established habitation on the island, constructing around 40 huts. By the 1890s, local press began to cast the island in a sharply negative light, describing the Native inhabitants as squatters, and the island as a lawless and disease-ridden place. Police briefly cleared and quarantined the island in 1892 due to suspicions of smallpox.

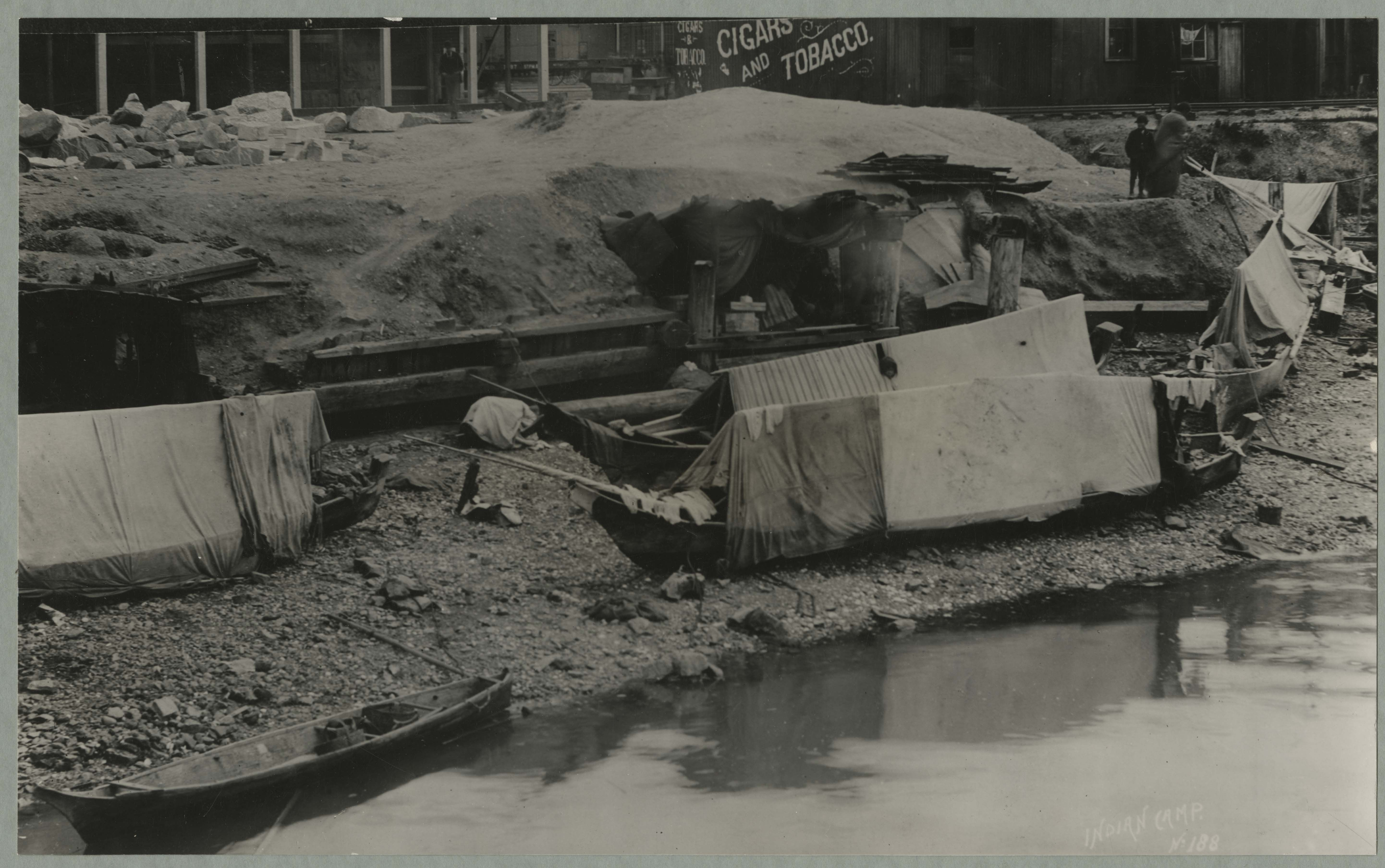
Camp on Ballast Island, c. 1895

Ballast Island attracted Native workers from as far afield as Alaska and British Columbia, as well as from various regions along the Salish Sea. Although many were still employed as migrant farm workers, native residents of Ballast Island increasingly turned to merchant work, selling seafood and crafts to tourists and marketgoers. Despite negative press coverage, tourists continued visits to the island, often violating the privacy of the residents by exploring their houses and workspaces.

On March 7, 1893, settler vigilantes torched and destroyed the West Seattle Duwamish village of t̕uʔəlalʔtxʷ, 'Herring's House', forcing the inhabitants to flee to Ballast Island. Many of the Duwamish refugees on Ballast Island soon moved elsewhere, primarily to local reservations. A smaller number relocated to native communities along the Black and Duwamish River valleys, or to an encampment at West Point, now part of Magnolia.

== Subsumption and archaeology ==
The OIC announced plans to build a warehouse on Ballast Island in 1896. The warehouse was constructed two years later, alongside expansions of Ocean Dock, ending native residence on the island. Portions of the island were covered by an elevated extension of Railroad Avenue, alongside dredging operations to accommodate a slipway between the OIC docks. Much of the remaining portion of the island were covered by the construction of a Columbia and Puget Sound Railroad station in 1905.

The material comprising Ballast Island sits in its original location beneath later developments in the Central Waterfront, now 5–25 feet (1.5–7.5 m) beneath ground. It is now overlaid by additional fill reinforced with sheet pile retaining walls. Atop the fill lies various roads including Alaskan Way, a parking lot, and portions of Pier 48. Only the eastern portion of the island has been subject to archaeological surveys, but has been modified considerably due to its location under and various utility networks. The western portion of the island is thought to be largely intact, and possibly containing archaeological artifacts undisturbed since they were first buried underground.

During the construction of the State Route 99 tunnel, the Bertha tunnel boring machine became stuck in rocks near Ballast Island, triggering significant archaeological interest in the former island, alongside concerns that the tunnel boring may have inadvertently disturbed the remains of the site. The Washington State Department of Transportation and Washington Department of Archaeology and Historic Preservation began archaeological testing in the surrounding area. This testing led to more accurate identification of Ballast Island's location. Testing concluded that the remains of the island were not affected by the boring, although a shell midden was found near the site of the drill.

== Legacy ==
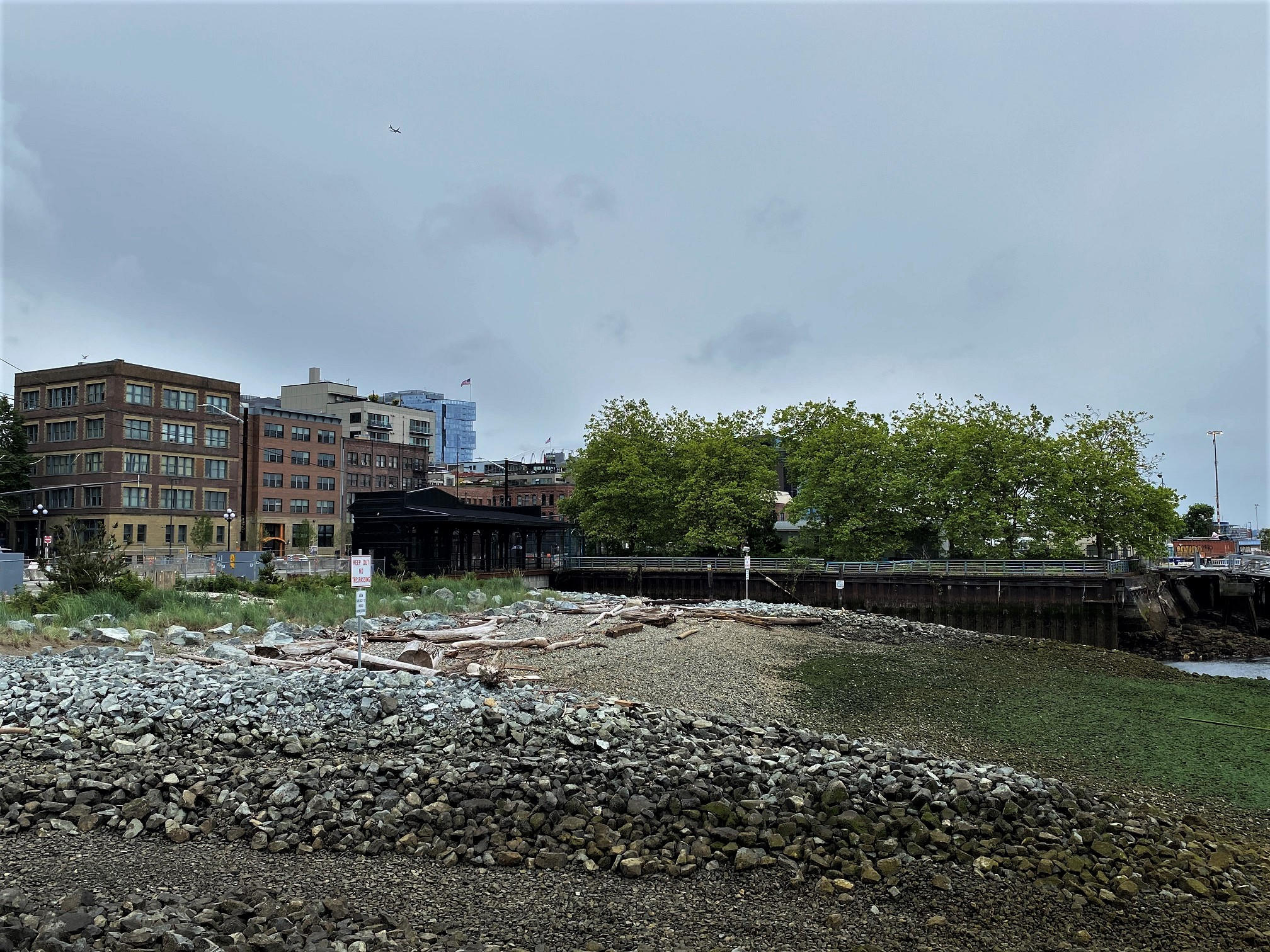
Ballast Island is now inland from the recently created Habitat Beach, looking southeast from Colman Dock

Ballast Island was listed on the National Register of Historic Places on January 27, 2021.

A plaque memorializing the island is located at Washington Street Boat Landing, a pergola located adjacent to the former site of the island. Public art commemorating the Duwamish presence on Ballast Island was installed in November 2023 at the newly-opened Pioneer Square Habitat Beach, part of Waterfront Park. Described by the Office of the Waterfront as a "interpretive viewing experience", the work consists of four stone columns, erected in a partnership between the Washington State Department of Transportation and various local tribal entities.
