= Ballast Island (Lake Erie) =

Private island located in Lake Erie

Coordinates: 41.6778°N 82.7853°W

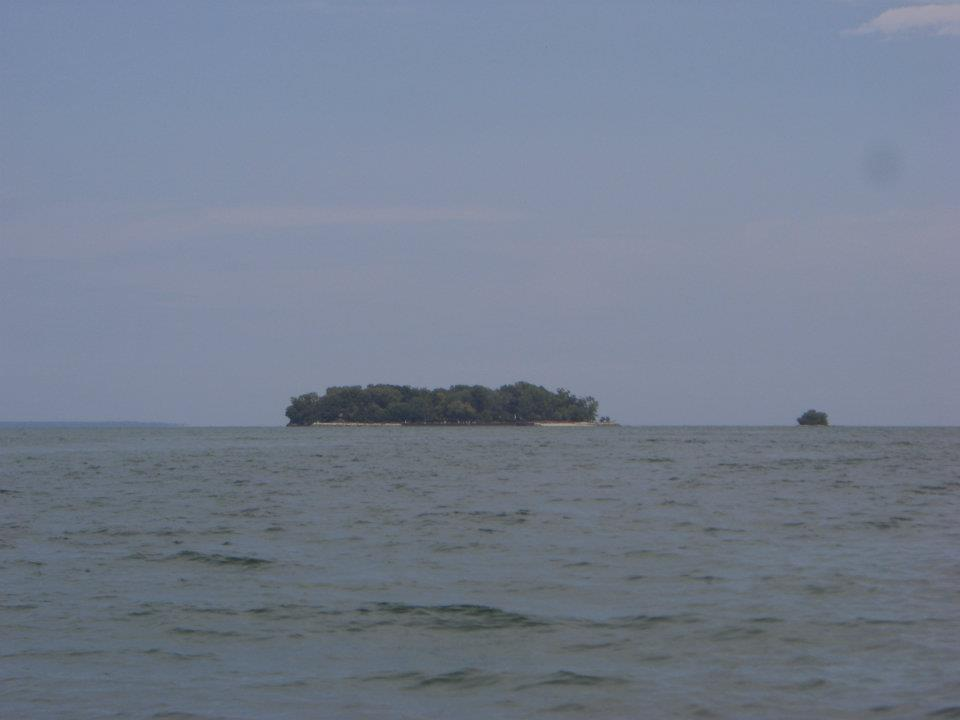
Ballast Island (left) and Lost Ballast Island as viewed from the Sonny-S between Middle Bass Island, Ohio and South Bass Island, Ohio.

Ballast Island is a small, 15-acre (0.049 km²) private island on Lake Erie in the U.S. state of Ohio, about one-quarter mile (0.4 km) northeast of the northeast tip of South Bass Island, Ohio. It is known primarily as a navigation point for boats going to or from Put-in-Bay, Ohio from the east. There are shoals between Ballast and South Bass Islands, but there is a passage between known locally as "the wagon tracks".

== History ==
Ballast Island received its name when commodore Oliver Hazard Perry used rocks from this island, according to legend, to ballast his ships.

Lemuel Brown had acquired the island at one point. The deeds show that Brown acquired the island from Joseph de Rivera St. Jurgo in 1869. George William Gardner purchased Ballast Island from Lemuel Brown in 1874 according to Ottawa County records.

=== Settlement ===
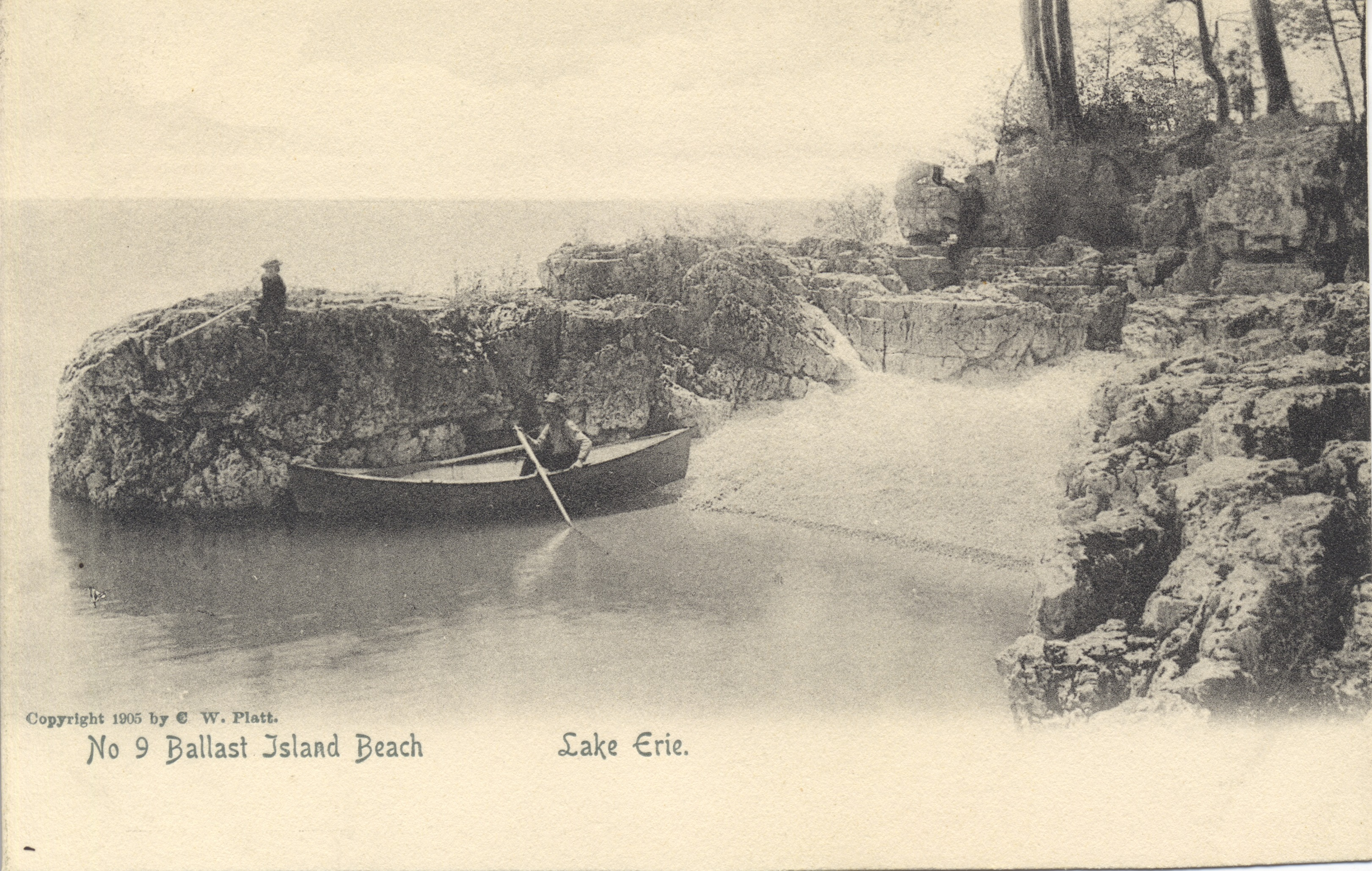
1905 photo of a beach on the island.

After completing his purchase of Ballast, George W. Gardner sold to his friends, including Henry Corning, Will Claflin and Civil War General James Barnett, undivided interests with the right to build a cottage. The island then became a cooperative association of wealthy families. During the late 19th and early 20th centuries, Ballast Island flourished. A large hotel and dining hall were constructed high on the cliffs of the north side of the island. A windmill supplied water and carbide lanterns supplied light. During this time many cottages were built around the east and west shores along with the Gardner Log Cabin. Over the years the Gardner family has lived in this log house, including George W., his son George Henry, Kenneth and Constance Gardner, and currently the daughter of Ken and Constance. During the 1890-early 1900 time span the southeast corner of Ballast facing Buckeye Point on South Bass was adorned by a boat house. This boat house served as the headquarters for the Longworth Canoe club. The canoe club was named after Nicholas Longworth, who was the father-in-law of Theodore Roosevelts's daughter, Alice. Presidents Theodore Roosevelt, William McKinley, James Garfield and Grover Cleveland all have visited Ballast.

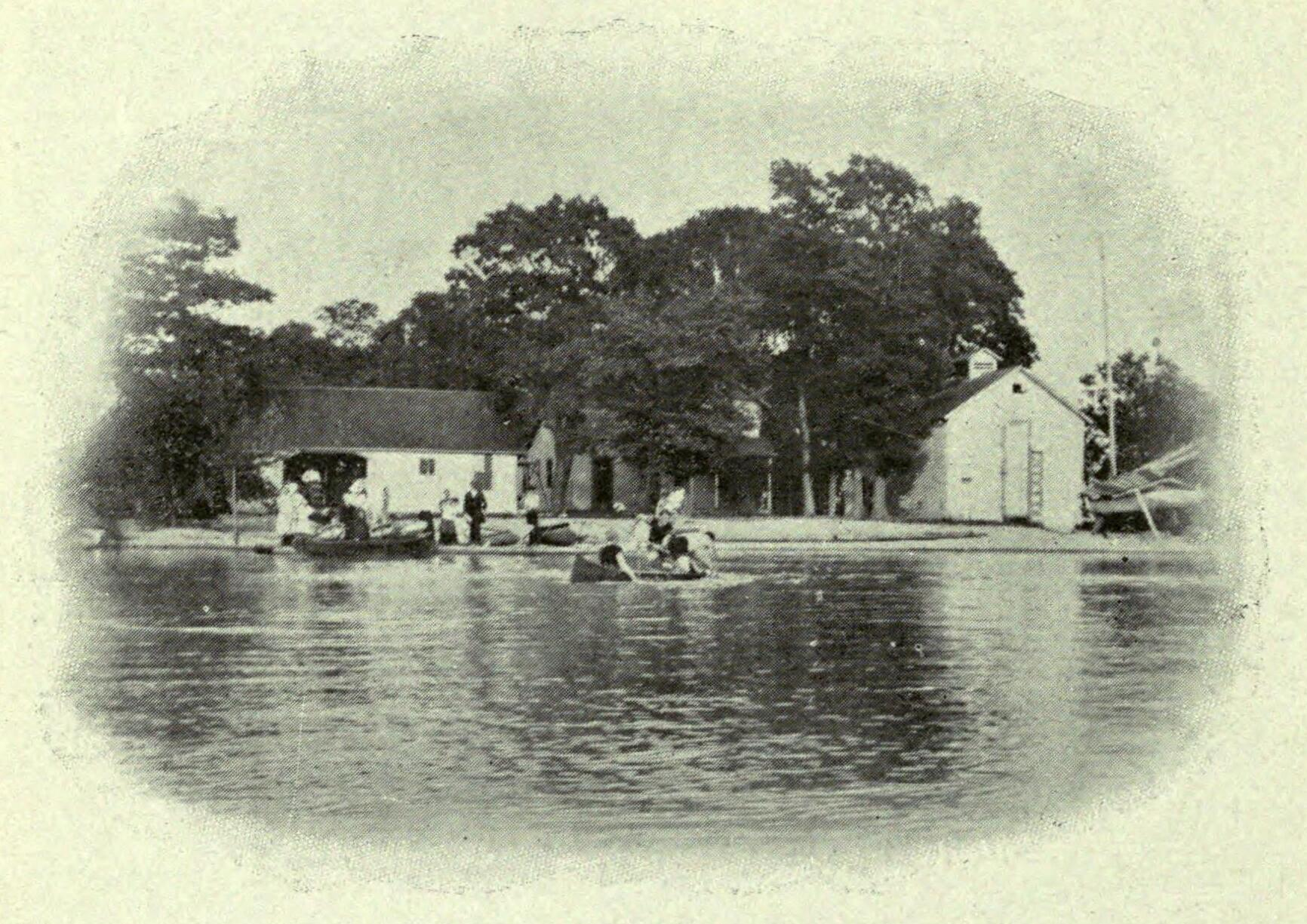
Ballast Island in 1913.

During the depression years, Ballast was not used as often because of the expense. In the 1930s and 1940s the steamers SS Goodtime, SS Put-in-Bay, and SS Chippewa brought friends to the island, and Ballast once again flourished. In the 1950s, several owners died but the partition deed that was in place, held. This was because one of the original signers, Constance "Kiki" Gardner was still living.

=== Private Ownership ===
In 1958 one of Kiki's daughters, Constance Gardner Moore offered to buy Roseanne Gilmore's property. The offer was accepted and the Moore family became part owners of Ballast Island. At the same time the majority of Ballast island was for sale. It was purchased by Cleveland businessman Amerigo (Rick) Nerone in 1966. In his later years, he gave ownership to his five children, all split equally. Ballast now is a private get away for the Nerone family and guests they choose to invite. There are currently nine houses on the island.
