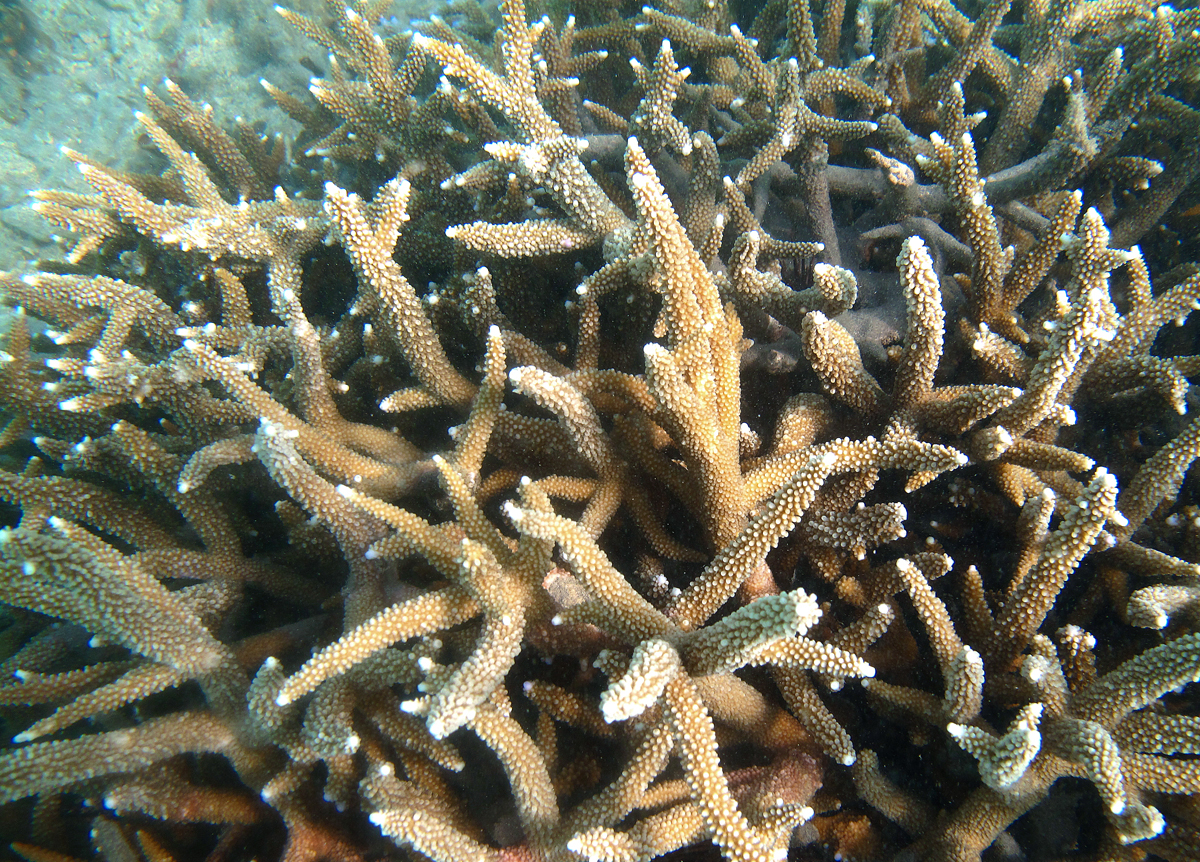

Conservation status
- Endangered (IUCN 3.1)

Scientific classification
- Kingdom: Animalia
- Phylum: Cnidaria
- Subphylum: Anthozoa
- Class: Hexacorallia
- Order: Scleractinia
- Family: Acroporidae
- Genus: Acropora
- Species: A. muricata

Binomial name
- Acropora muricata (Linnaeus, 1758)

Synonyms
- List: Acropora arbuscula (Dana, 1846); Acropora copiosa Nemenzo, 1967; Acropora formosa (Dana, 1846); Acropora gracilis (Dana, 1846); Acropora laevis Crossland, 1952; Acropora varia Nemenzo, 1967; Isopora muricata (Linnaeus, 1758); Madrepora brachiata Dana, 1846; Madrepora formosa Dana, 1846; Madrepora gracilis Dana, 1846; Madrepora muricata (Linnaeus, 1758); Madrepora stellulata Verrill, 1902; Madrepora virgata Dana, 1846; Millepora muricata Linnaeus, 1758

= Acropora muricata =

Species of coral

Acropora muricata, commonly called staghorn coral, is a species of acroporid coral found in the Gulf of Aden, the Red Sea, Indian Ocean, Persian Gulf, Australia, central Indo-Pacific, Japan, Southeast Asia, the East China Sea and the oceanic central and western Pacific Ocean. It is found in tropical shallow reefs, slopes of reefs, and in lagoons, from depths of 5 to 30 m. It was described by Dana in 1846.

== Description ==
It occurs in arborescent colonies forming thickets with diameters of up to 10 metres (33 ft). Its branches vary from being short in shallower water to being less clumped in deeper water. Its axial corallites protrude from the branches and the radial corallites are tube-shaped. It is blue, brown or cream, and the ends of branches are pale. It looks similar to Acropora teres.

== Distribution ==
It is classed as a near threatened species on the IUCN Red List and it is thought that its population is decreasing; the species is listed under Appendix II of CITES. Figures of its population are unknown, but is likely to be threatened by the global decline of coral reefs, the increase of temperature causing coral bleaching, climate change, human activity, the crown-of-thorns starfish (Acanthaster planci) and disease. It occurs in the Gulf of Aden, the Red Sea, the northwest and southwest Indian Ocean, the northern Indian Ocean, the Persian Gulf, Australia, the central Indo-Pacific, Japan, Southeast Asia, the East China Sea and the oceanic central and western Pacific Ocean. It occurs at depths of between 5 and 30 metres (16 and 98 ft).

== Taxonomy ==
It was originally described as Millepora muricata by Linnaeus in 1758 .
