= Gymnothorax ryukyuensis =

Scientific classification
- Domain: Eukaryota
- Kingdom: Animalia
- Phylum: Chordata
- Class: Actinopterygii
- Order: Anguilliformes
- Family: Muraenidae
- Genus: Gymnothorax
- Species: G. ryukyuensis

Binomial name
- Gymnothorax ryukyuensis Hatooka, 2003

Species of fish

Gymnothorax ryukyuensis is a species of fish from the genus Gymnothorax. It is native to the Pacific Ocean in the Ryukyu Islands. This tan colored fish has dark spots and patches around its body, and it has a total vertebrae of 133–134. It is most closely related to G. flavimarginatus.
