= Los Angeles Harbor College =

Community college in Wilmington, California, US

- Motto: Education Changes Everything!
- Type: Public community college
- Established: 1949
- President: Luis Dorado
- Students: 10,083
- Location: 1111 Figueroa Place, Wilmington, California, United States; 33.784°N 118.284°W
- Campus: Urban
- Colors: Blue and Yellow
- Mascot: Sammy the Seahawk
- Website: www.lahc.edu

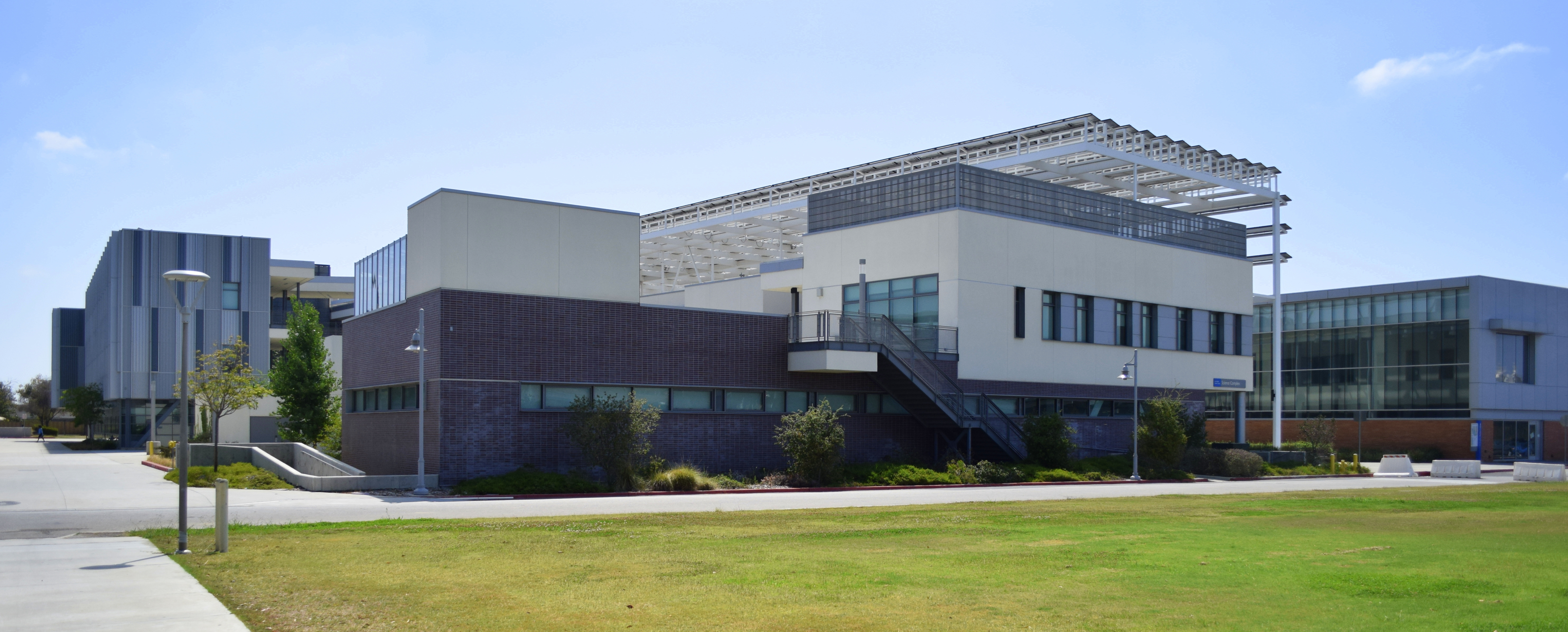
Los Angeles Harbor College

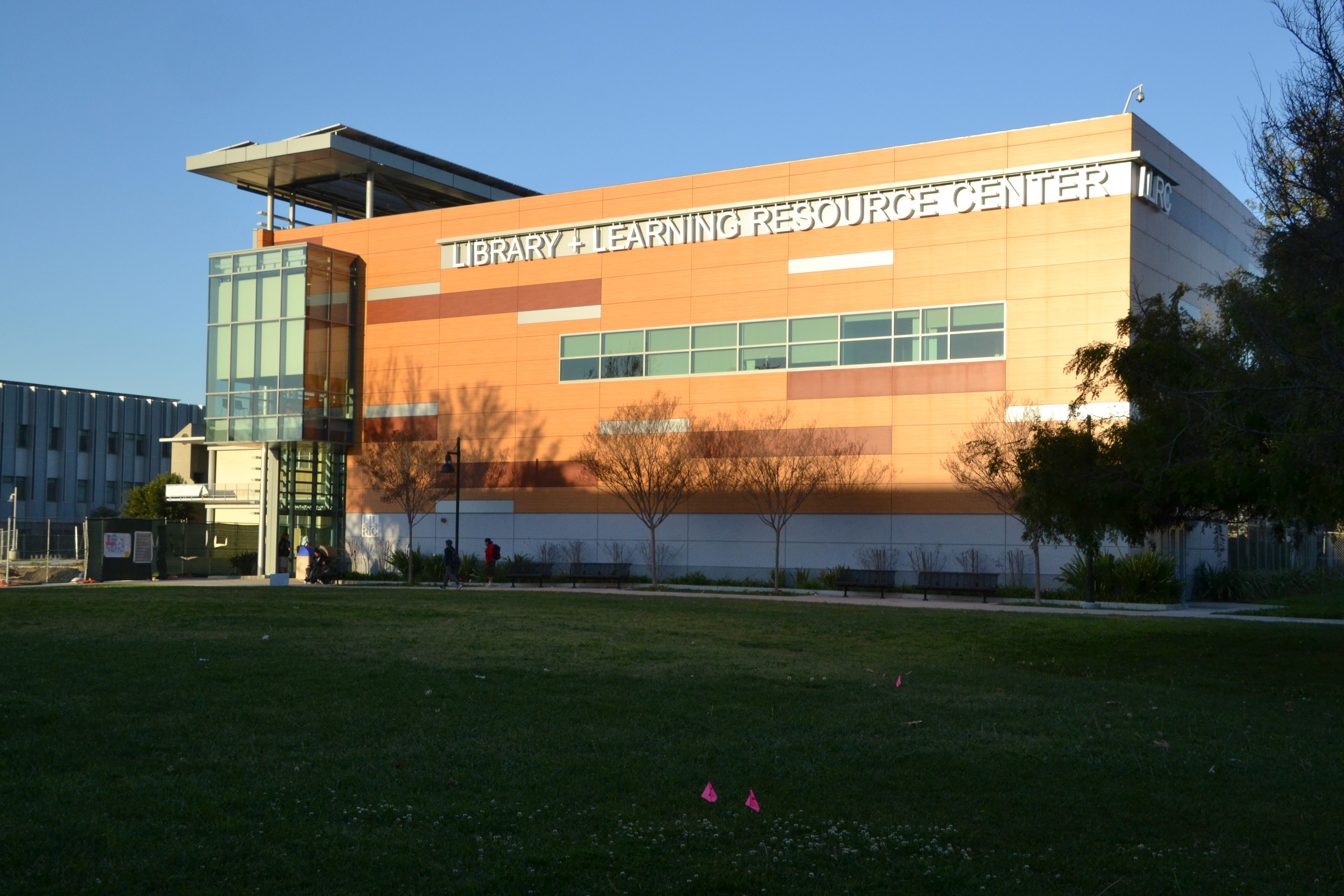
Library and Learning Resource Center

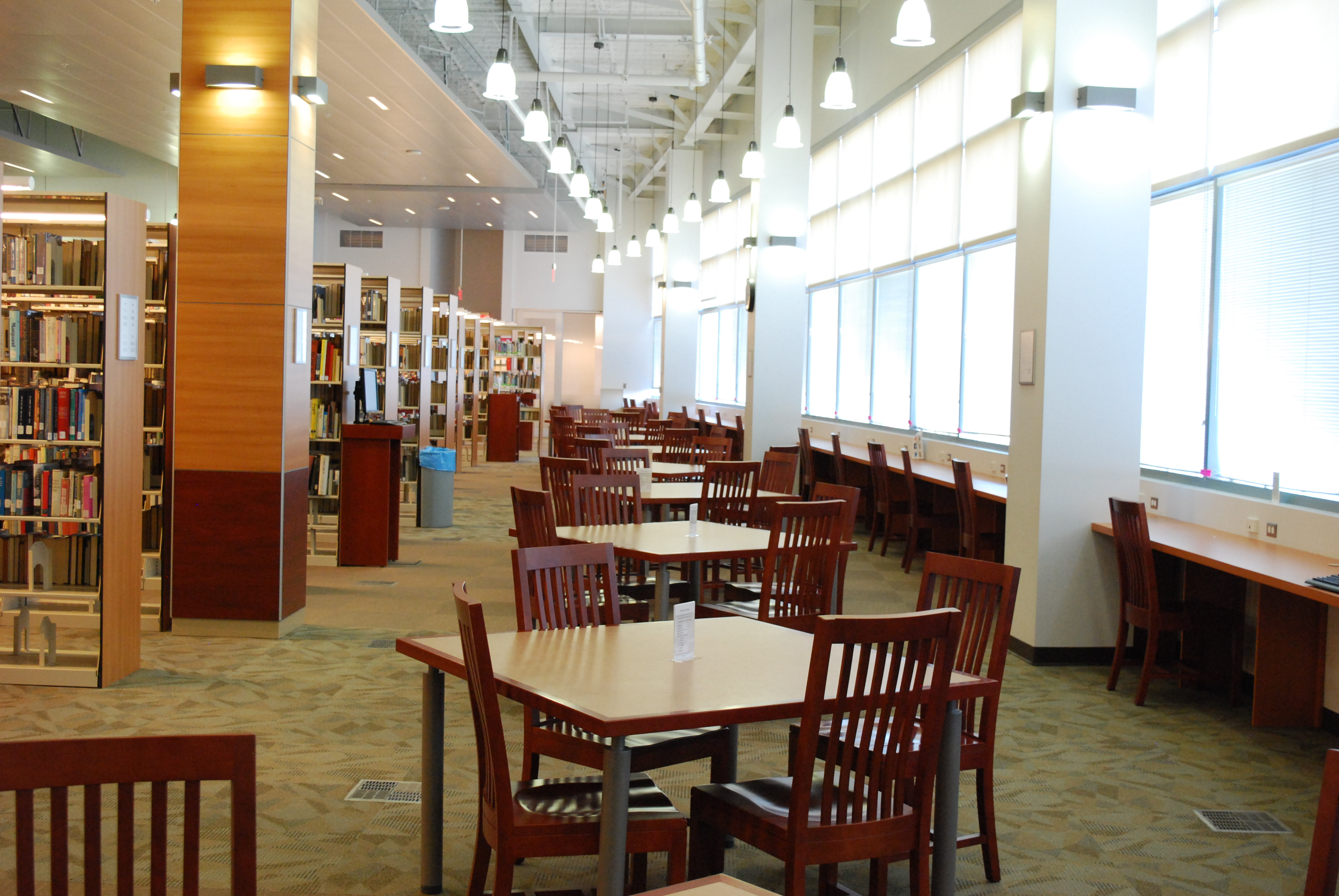
A library

Los Angeles Harbor College (LAHC) is a public community college in Wilmington, California. It is one of two community colleges serving the South Bay region of Los Angeles. LAHC serves mainly students from Harbor City, Carson, San Pedro, Gardena, Lomita, Wilmington and the Palos Verdes Peninsula.

LAHC is located between Wilmington and Harbor City, the heart of the Los Angeles harbor region.

== Student body ==
LAHC accommodates over 8,900 students per semester. As of 2010, 37% of LAHC's population were part-time students, with 65% describing themselves as full-time. Its student population is about 39% male and 61% female.

Student body composition as of 2022
Race and ethnicity	Total
Hispanic	61%
White	11%
Asian	11%
Black	9%
Unknown	3%
Two or more races (Note: Other consists of Multiracial Americans & those who prefer to not say.)	3%
Foreign national	1%
Gender Distribution
Male	39%
Female	61%
Age Distribution
Under 18	11%
18–24	54%
25–64	35%

== Academics ==
Like most community colleges in the state of California, LAHC offers programs for students to eventually transfer to a four-year university as well as occupational training programs in business and office administration, electronics technology, computer technology, and nursing. The college also offers a program for international students.

== Notable alumni ==
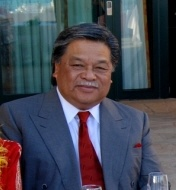
Ben Cayetano

- Gary Alexander, former catcher and outfielder in Major League Baseball
- Bobby Brooks, major-league outfielder
- Enos Cabell, former third baseman and first baseman in Major League Baseball
- Benjamin Cayetano, former governor of Hawaii
- Michael Dudikoff, American actor
- Dock Ellis, former pitcher in Major League Baseball
- David Hackworth, Army officer and author
- Don Horn, NFL quarterback
- Dennis Johnson, NBA player for the Boston Celtics, Seattle SuperSonics and Phoenix Suns
- Kyle Kazan, American businessman
- Chris Matthews, NFL and CFL wide receiver
- Michael Mendoza, American football player
- Juanita Millender-McDonald, former member of the US House of Representatives
- Justin Miller, major-league pitcher
- Haven Moses, NFL wide receiver
- Scott Stantis, editorial cartoonist for the Chicago Tribune and creator of the comic strips The Buckets and Prickly City
- Jon Weber, minor-league outfielder
- Mike Watt, bassist for the Minutemen

== See also ==
- California Community Colleges System
