= 2004 Pulitzer Prize =

Awards for journalism and related fields

The Pulitzer Prizes for 2004 were announced on April 5, 2004.

The Los Angeles Times won five journalism awards, the most that the newspaper has ever won in a single year and second only to The New York Times in 2002 for the most won in a year by any paper.

== Journalism awards ==
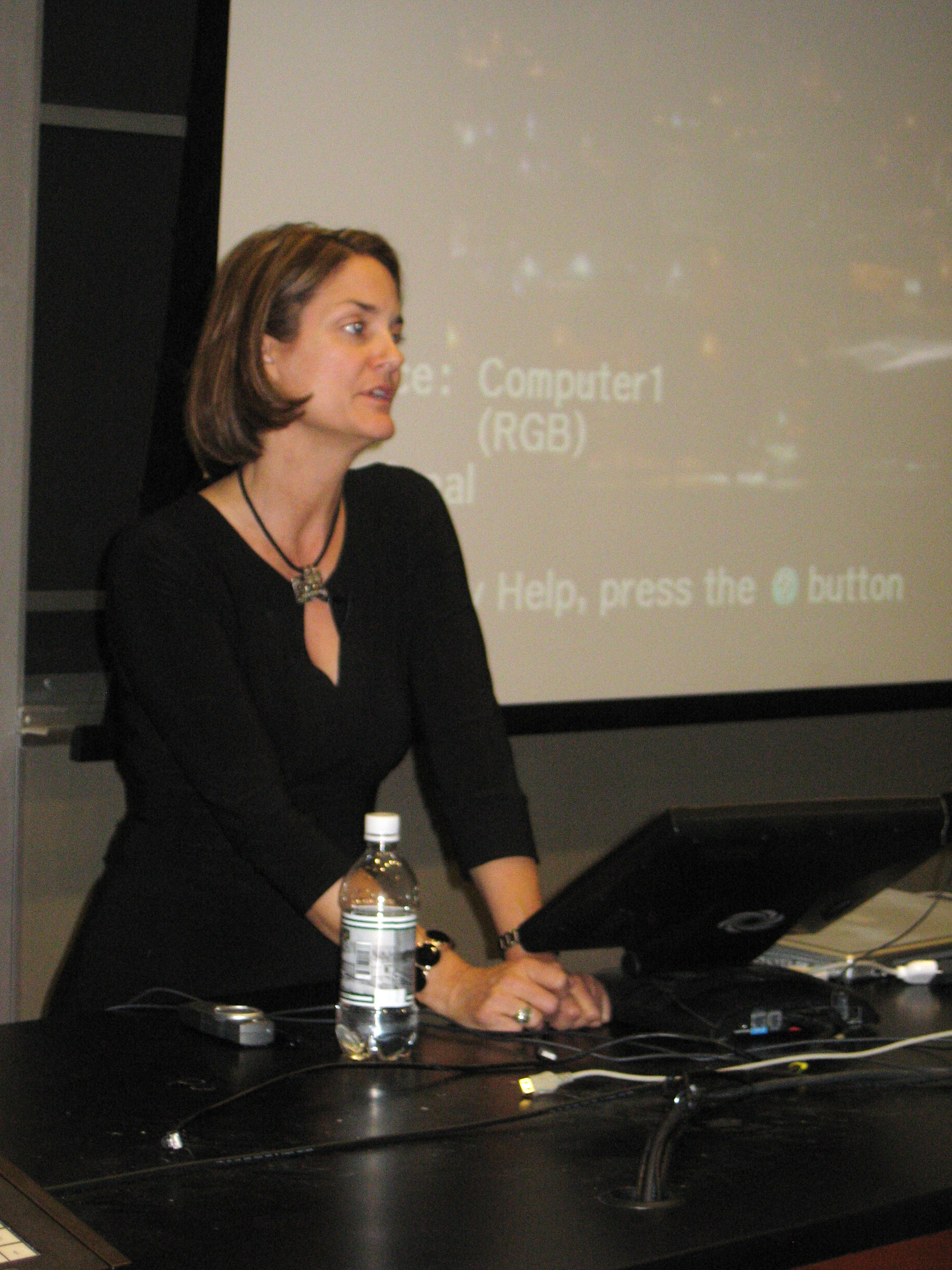
Photojournalist Carolyn Cole, who won for feature photography

- Beat Reporting:
  - Daniel Golden, The Wall Street Journal, for his compelling and meticulously documented stories on admission preferences given to the children of alumni and donors at American universities.
- Breaking News Reporting:
  - Staff of the Los Angeles Times, for its compelling and comprehensive coverage of the massive wildfires that imperiled a populated region of southern California.
- Breaking News Photography:
  - David Leeson and Cheryl Diaz Meyer, The Dallas Morning News, for their eloquent photographs depicting both the violence and poignancy of the war with Iraq.
- Commentary:
  - Leonard Pitts Jr., The Miami Herald, for his fresh, vibrant columns that spoke, with both passion and compassion, to ordinary people on often divisive issues.
- Criticism:
  - Dan Neil, Los Angeles Times, for his one-of-a-kind reviews of automobiles, blending technical expertise with offbeat humor and astute cultural observations.
- Editorial Cartooning:
  - Matt Davies, Journal News, for his piercing cartoons on an array of topics, drawn with a fresh, original style.
- Editorial Writing:
  - William Stall, Los Angeles Times, for his incisive editorials that analyzed California's troubled state government, prescribed remedies and served as a model for addressing complex state issues.
- Explanatory Reporting:
  - Kevin Helliker and Thomas M. Burton, The Wall Street Journal, for their groundbreaking examination of aneurysms, an often overlooked medical condition that kills thousands of Americans each year.
- Feature Photography:
  - Carolyn Cole, Los Angeles Times, for her cohesive, behind-the-scenes look at the effects of civil war in Liberia, with special attention to innocent citizens caught in the conflict.
- Feature Writing:
  - not awarded
- International Reporting:
  - Anthony Shadid, The Washington Post, for his extraordinary ability to capture, at personal peril, the voices and emotions of Iraqis as their country was invaded, their leader toppled and their way of life upended.
- Investigative Reporting:
  - Michael D. Sallah, Mitch Weiss and Joe Mahr of The Blade, for their powerful series on atrocities by Tiger Force, an elite U.S. Army platoon, during the Vietnam War.
- National Reporting:
  - Staff of the Los Angeles Times, for its engrossing examination of the tactics that have made Wal-Mart the largest company in the world with cascading effects across American towns and developing countries.
- Public Service:
  - The New York Times, for the work of David Barstow and Lowell Bergman that relentlessly examined death and injury among American workers and exposed employers who break basic safety rules. (This was moved by the board from the Investigative Reporting category, where it was also entered.)

== Letters awards ==
- Biography or Autobiography:
  - Khrushchev: The Man and His Era by William Taubman (W.W. Norton)
- Fiction:
  - The Known World by Edward P. Jones (Amistad/HarperCollins)
- General Nonfiction:
  - Gulag: A History by Anne Applebaum (Doubleday)
- History:
  - A Nation Under Our Feet by Steven Hahn (The Belknap Press of Harvard University Press)
- Poetry:
  - Walking to Martha's Vineyard by Franz Wright (Alfred A. Knopf)

== Arts awards ==
- Drama: I Am My Own Wife by Doug Wright (Faber and Faber)
- Music: Tempest Fantasy by Paul Moravec (Subito Music)
