= Dennis Stout =

US soldier who reported Vietnam war crimes

- Citizenship: United States of America (birthplace)
- Military Career
- Branch: United States Army
- Rank: Staff Sergeant E6
- Unit: 1st Battalion / 327th Infantry, 101st Airborne Division
- Conflicts: Vietnam War

Staff Sergeant Dennis Stout was among the first U.S. soldiers to report atrocities committed by American troops during the Vietnam War.

He arrived in Vietnam in September 1966 to join the 1st Battalion, 327th Infantry Regiment of the 101st Airborne Division, which had deployed to Quảng Ngãi province in the Central Highlands. After being wounded three times, he became the battalion's press officer. During the spring of 1967, he witnessed systematic atrocities committed by soldiers in both Tiger Force, a long-range reconnaissance unit, and the broader 101st Airborne Division in the Central Highlands. While still serving, Stout reported the crimes to his superiors but was told to ignore them.

Days after his 1969 discharge, he contacted reporters at several Arizona newspapers and repeated his account, drawing a visit from agents of the Army's Criminal Investigation Division (CID), to whom he again turned over evidence. On June 8, 1969, he spoke at an anti-war rally in Phoenix, publicly disclosing what he had witnessed for the first time; two days before the speech, CID agents visited him again and threatened him.

The Army opened an internal inquiry, later called the "Stout Allegation," that ran four and a half years and substantiated 20 war crimes involving 18 soldiers, but resulted in no charges. The case remained largely unknown until 2003, when Toledo Blade reporters Michael D. Sallah and Mitch Weiss published Buried Secrets, Brutal Truths, a Pulitzer Prize-winning series on the Tiger Force atrocities.

== Background ==
Reports of war crimes by U.S. troops surfaced well before the Mỹ Lai massacre of March 1968. The earliest and best known came from Master Sergeant Donald W. Duncan, a decorated Army Special Forces soldier who appeared on the cover of the February 1966 issue of Ramparts announcing "I quit!" Duncan described numerous atrocities, including interrogation torture and the use of Vietnamese proxies to summarily execute prisoners. That June, three soldiers who became known as the Fort Hood Three publicly refused deployment to Vietnam, the first such refusal. One of them, Private Dennis Mora, defended the Vietnamese people's right to self-defense and refused to take part in what he called the extermination of a whole people. In early 1967, Army doctor Captain Howard Levy refused to train Green Beret medics headed to Vietnam, arguing the Army was using them to win over villages it was simultaneously destroying. Dennis Stout's 1967 attempts to report the crimes he witnessed belong to this same early wave of dissent; he appears to have been the second U.S. soldier, after Duncan, to personally witness and then report systematic atrocities by American troops in Vietnam.

== Vietnam ==
Stout enlisted in the Army straight out of high school and served initially as an infantryman with the 101st Airborne. After receiving orders for Vietnam, he taught himself roughly two hundred words of Vietnamese, saying later that he did not want to be shooting people he could not talk to and that he had always regarded the Vietnamese as human, even though his unit's vocabulary for them never allowed for it.

=== War crimes ===
On his first combat operation, Stout was paired with an experienced soldier and told to follow his lead. In a small village, the soldier threw a grenade into a shelter and had Stout throw a second one in; when children could be heard screaming after the blasts, the soldier threw a third grenade, silencing them. The hut was later found to contain the bodies of mothers, small children, and elderly people.

On another patrol, his unit rounded up around forty civilians in a field; a lieutenant then ordered them shot. During a sweep of a large valley, the unit was ordered to kill everything in it. Stout later described the operation:

We killed every animal, every person, burned all the houses, chopped down the fruit trees, and put a box of poison down the wells. And so we came in sweeping through the valley killing absolutely everyone, no matter what age.

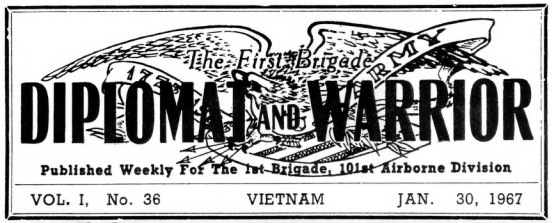
Diplomat and Warrior Masthead Jan 30, 1967

Within a year Stout had been wounded three times, twice grazed by bullets and once buried alive in June 1967 when a mortar round struck a nearby ammunition dump. While recovering from concussion and temporary deafness, his superiors learned he had wanted to be a writer before enlisting and made him the battalion's public information officer, writing and photographing for the 101st Airborne's official newspaper, the Diplomat and Warrior. Ordered to file "feel good" stories on the positive side of the war, he grew bored producing near-identical copy, and was glad when he was finally assigned to cover Tiger Force.

=== Tiger Force ===
On his first mission with the unit, Stout watched the patrol shoot two unarmed men who appeared to be civilians and were shouting for the soldiers not to fire. When other soldiers questioned the shooting, the team leader told them it was a free-fire zone and that they should not question it. A free-fire zone is a combat area in which any moving target is considered legitimate, a designation now considered to violate the laws of war. Officers in the field applied the term literally, telling their men there were no friendlies and to shoot anything that moved.

On another patrol, a soldier tied an elderly man to a tree and began skinning him alive, reviving him with water and slaps when he passed out from the pain, then shooting him when he stopped responding.

Stout also witnessed the gang rape and murder of a captured Vietnamese teenager, carried out by most of the platoon over two days; he, the medic, and one other soldier did not participate. When he reported the incident to his battalion sergeant major, he was told to forget it. He then brought the Army chaplain to raise it again, but the sergeant major dismissed the chaplain and warned Stout that if he raised the matter again, he would not return from his next operation.

Despite his role as public information officer, Stout was not permitted to write about any of the atrocities he witnessed.

=== Accusations confirmed ===
Stout's allegations remained hidden by the Army for decades until the 2003 Toledo Blade investigation documented and confirmed them. The Blade found that between 1971 and 1975 the Army's Criminal Investigation Command had investigated Tiger Force for alleged war crimes committed between May and November 1967. Sworn statements from Tiger Force veterans, both those who allegedly took part and those who did not, described a pattern of war crimes during the Song Ve Valley and Wheeler campaigns: the routine torture and execution of prisoners, the deliberate killing of unarmed villagers regardless of age, the severing and collecting of victims' ears, the wearing of necklaces made from them, the taking of scalps, the planting of weapons on murdered villagers to disguise them as combatants, the drugging, rape, and execution of a young mother, and the killing and beheading of an infant after its mother had already been killed.

Even so, historian Nick Turse has argued that Tiger Force represents only the visible edge of a much larger, still largely undocumented history of atrocities across the war.

== Going public ==
After his February 1969 discharge, Stout became, in his own account, the first combat veteran to join the antiwar movement at Arizona State University, determined to stop the war and willing to go public. He had kept the identification cards of several murdered Vietnamese and recorded the names and unit numbers of those responsible. Having already failed to get the Army to act through internal channels, he turned to the press instead. He called reporters at several Arizona papers and described the dehumanization of Vietnamese civilians, the torture and killing of prisoners, and the mutilation of the dead, including an account of a medic who killed an elderly couple by injecting them with a mixture of swamp water, rubbing alcohol, and merthiolate. He placed the blame on Army policy rather than individual soldiers and described his unsuccessful earlier efforts to have the killings investigated.

He was unaware at the time that the Army had opened its own internal inquiry, the "Stout Allegation," which after four and a half years substantiated his claims but resulted in no charges and was kept from public view.

Stout has said he was harassed by the FBI and questioned by the CIA in the aftermath: his employer was pressured to fire him, his G.I. Bill benefits were disrupted for months, his bank manager was pressured into bouncing his checks, his mail and calls were monitored, his old classmates were questioned, and an unknown woman phoned his wife to falsely claim he was having an affair. He eventually tried to leave the country, only to discover when he applied for a passport that he had been placed on a list of foreign agents; he was unable to obtain one for eight years.

Stout continues to speak publicly about what he witnessed, and has said that if his reports had been acted on in 1967, the Mỹ Lai massacre might never have happened.

== See also ==
- Court-martial of Howard Levy
- Fort Hood Three
- My Lai massacre
- Soldiers in Revolt: GI Resistance During the Vietnam War
