= Greg Cravens =

American cartoonist

- Born: Greg Cravens; July 2, 1965 (age 60); Jackson, Tennessee, United States
- Occupation: Cartoonist
- Known for: The Buckets comic strip (2000–present); Hubris! comics strip (2010-present)
- Parent(s): Cecil and Bonnie

Greg Cravens (born July 2, 1965 in Jackson, Tennessee) is an American cartoonist.

His parents are Cecil and Bonnie Cravens. Cecil was the owner of Cecil's Bandstand and invented the Straplock, which holds guitar straps to the guitar. His mother Bonnie worked at various hospital billing departments and handicraft stores, while maintaining the family home. Greg Cravens has one brother, Jeff, who contributes quite a bit to the Hubris! website.

As a child and youth, Greg Cravens attended Lincoln Elementary School, Parkway Junior High, and Jackson Central-Merry High School, all in Jackson, Tennessee.

== Career ==
His first comic strip, Zork & Eem, ran in the Jackson weekly Jackson Banner for three weeks until the newspaper folded. At sixteen and seventeen, Cravens drew caricatures at the Nashville themepark Opryland USA. Cravens then went to Memphis State University to earn a BFA degree in graphic design and worked in advertising.

He has drawn many activity books and coloring books for the likes of Shoney's restaurants, Perkins restaurants, FedEx, Piggly Wiggly, Hampton Inns, Homewood Suites, Embassy Suites, Memphis Grizzlies, IPNI, Baptist Hospitals, Morgan Keegan etc. He is the illustrator of the Lewis The Duck series of books available at Homewood Suites hotels.

=== The Buckets ===
In 2000, Cravens was contacted by his friend/mentor Scott Stantis, an editorial cartoonist at The Chicago Tribune about being an art assistant on his syndicated feature The Buckets, a comic strip about family life featuring a married couple, their two sons, a dog and their mortgage.

Cravens accepted and was hired just after the tenth anniversary of the strip, becoming art assistant, and six months later as credited art assistant and eventually sole writer and artist of the strip, with founder Stantis leaving The Buckets completely to focus on politically oriented Prickly City. Cravens also joined the National Cartoonists Society.

=== Hubris! ===
Another comic strip, Hubris!, was originally passed on by the syndicates, but it was later aided into existence by United Media syndicate editor Amy Lago, and turned into a webcomic in late 2010. It features the exploits of a small outdoors business owner, his family, friends and customers. It uses various sports equipment as part of the jokes. From unicycles, to offroad skateboards, and a kayak with wheels, to 'paddle home' from work. In late 2011, Cravens asked his then core readers/commentators to send in photos of themselves. During 2012, and 2013, Cravens did a series of strips about an outdoor fest, which included "Team US" — the people who sent in their photos.

=== Books ===
Greg Cravens has published three books:

- Splat - a free 'rhyme' ebook about a family cat.
- The Buckets Exhausted Parents Guide To Why Your Life Is Normal (ISBN 9781935933199, published September 2012)
- Hubris - I Meant To Do That (ISBN 9781935933182, published July 2012)

== Awards ==
- Cravens was awarded the National Cartoonists Society Tim Rosenthal award in 2006
- His newspaper illustrations for the Memphis Flyer were nominated for an NCS Reuben Division Award in 2007
