= Michael Deiter =

American football player (born 1996)

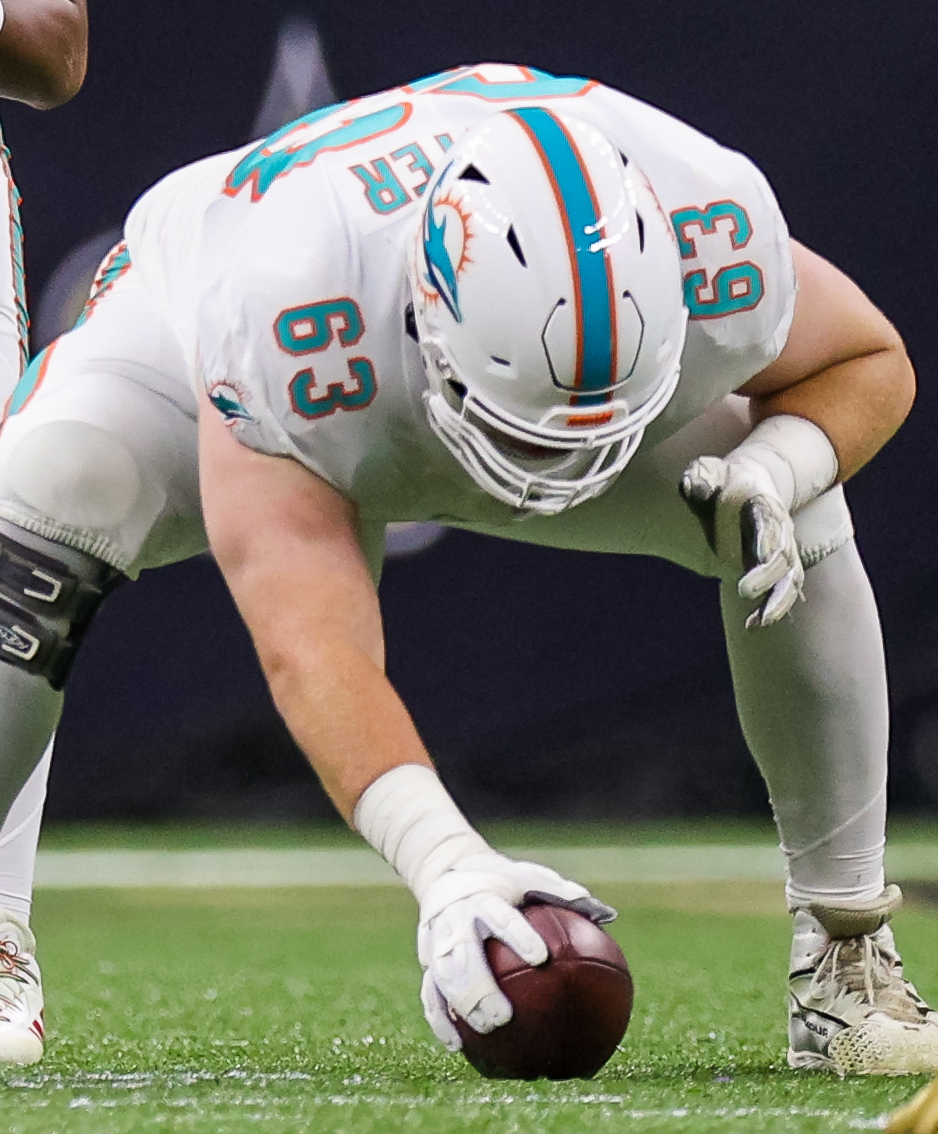
- Deiter with the Miami Dolphins in 2021

No. 67 – Denver Broncos
- Position: Center
- Roster status: Injured reserve

Personal information
- Born: September 3, 1996 (age 30); Curtice, Ohio, U.S.
- Listed height: 6 ft 6 in (1.98 m)
- Listed weight: 310 lb (141 kg)

Career information
- High school: Genoa Area (Genoa, Ohio)
- College: Wisconsin (2014–2018)
- NFL draft: 2019: 3rd round, 78th overall pick

Career history
- Miami Dolphins (2019–2022); Houston Texans (2023); Washington Commanders (2024–2025); Denver Broncos (2025–present)

Awards and highlights
- Second-team All-American (2018); Big Ten Offensive Lineman of the Year (2018); 2× First-team All-Big Ten (2017, 2018)

Career NFL statistics as of 2025
- Games played: 92
- Games started: 35
- Stats at Pro Football Reference

Michael Deiter (DEE-ter; born September 3, 1996) is an American professional football center for the Denver Broncos of the National Football League (NFL). He played college football for the Wisconsin Badgers and was selected by the Miami Dolphins in the third round of the 2019 NFL draft. Deiter has also played for the Houston Texans and Washington Commanders.

== Early life ==
Deiter attended Genoa Area High School in Genoa, Ohio. While there, he played high school football. In his junior season, he was selected Northern Buckeye Conference all-conference as both offensive lineman and defensive lineman in 2012. During his senior season, he was named Northern Buckeye Conference lineman of the year, first-team All-Ohio on offensive line, also earning Associated Press District IV Lineman of the Year and Great Lakes Region Lineman of the Year honors while leading Genoa (OH) to 10–1 record.

== College career ==
Deiter redshirted his freshman season at Wisconsin. As a Redshirt Freshman in 2015, he earned his first letter, starting all 13 games, including seven starts at left guard and six starts at center, including the season's final five games. Following the regular season, he was named All-Big Ten Conference honorable mention (media) and Big Ten All-Freshman (ESPN). During his Redshirt Sophomore season in 2016, he earned his second letter, starting all 14 games, including 10 starts at center and four starts at left guard, helping Wisconsin to a Big Ten Conference West Division Championship and a #9 final season ranking. Following the regular season, he was named a consensus All-Big Ten honorable mention.

Prior to the 2017 season, Deiter was named to the 2017 Outland Trophy and Rimington Trophy watch lists. Athlon Sports named him 2nd-team All-Big Ten.

On September 28, 2017, SB Nation named Deiter a frontrunner for the annual "Piesman" Trophy, an award awarded to a collegiate Lineman doing "decidedly un-lineman things" for his 4 yard rushing touchdown against Illinois.

Deiter considered forgoing his senior year and declaring for the 2018 NFL draft, but decided to return to Wisconsin to play at the guard position after playing tackle during his junior year. Returning to Wisconsin, Deiter was named an offensive captain for the team along with Alex Hornibrook. Prior to the season, Deiter was named an AP second-team preseason All American.

== Professional career ==
Pre-draft measurables
| Height | Weight | Arm length | Hand span | Wingspan | 40-yard dash | 10-yard split | 20-yard split | 20-yard shuttle | Three-cone drill | Vertical jump | Broad jump | Bench press |
|---|---|---|---|---|---|---|---|---|---|---|---|---|
| 6 ft 5 1/8 in (1.96 m) | 309 lb (140 kg) | 33 1/8 in (0.84 m) | 10 3/4 in (0.27 m) | 6 ft 6 5/8 in (2.00 m) | 5.23 s | 1.81 s | 3.04 s | 4.81 s | 7.88 s | 28.0 in (0.71 m) | 8 ft 9 in (2.67 m) | 21 reps |
All values from NFL Combine

=== Miami Dolphins ===
Deiter was drafted by the Miami Dolphins in the third round, 78th overall, in the 2019 NFL draft. As a rookie, he appeared in all 16 regular season games and started 15.

Deiter entered the 2021 season as the Dolphins starting center. He was placed on injured reserve on October 2, 2021. He was activated on December 4.

=== Houston Texans ===
On March 21, 2023, Deiter signed a one-year contract with the Houston Texans. He was released on August 29, and re-signed to the practice squad. He was promoted to the active roster on September 16.

=== Washington Commanders ===
On March 25, 2024, Deiter signed with the Washington Commanders. He started two games at center to fill in for an injured player. Deiter re-signed with the Commanders on March 13, 2025. He was waived on August 26, and signed with their practice squad the following day.

=== Denver Broncos ===
On January 7, 2026, Deiter signed with the Denver Broncos' practice squad. On January 20, he was released by the Broncos. Nine days later, Deiter signed a reserve/futures contract with them.

After suffering a hamstring injury during training camp, Deiter was placed on season-ending injured reserve on August 13, 2026.
