= Chris Bassitt =

American baseball player (born 1989)

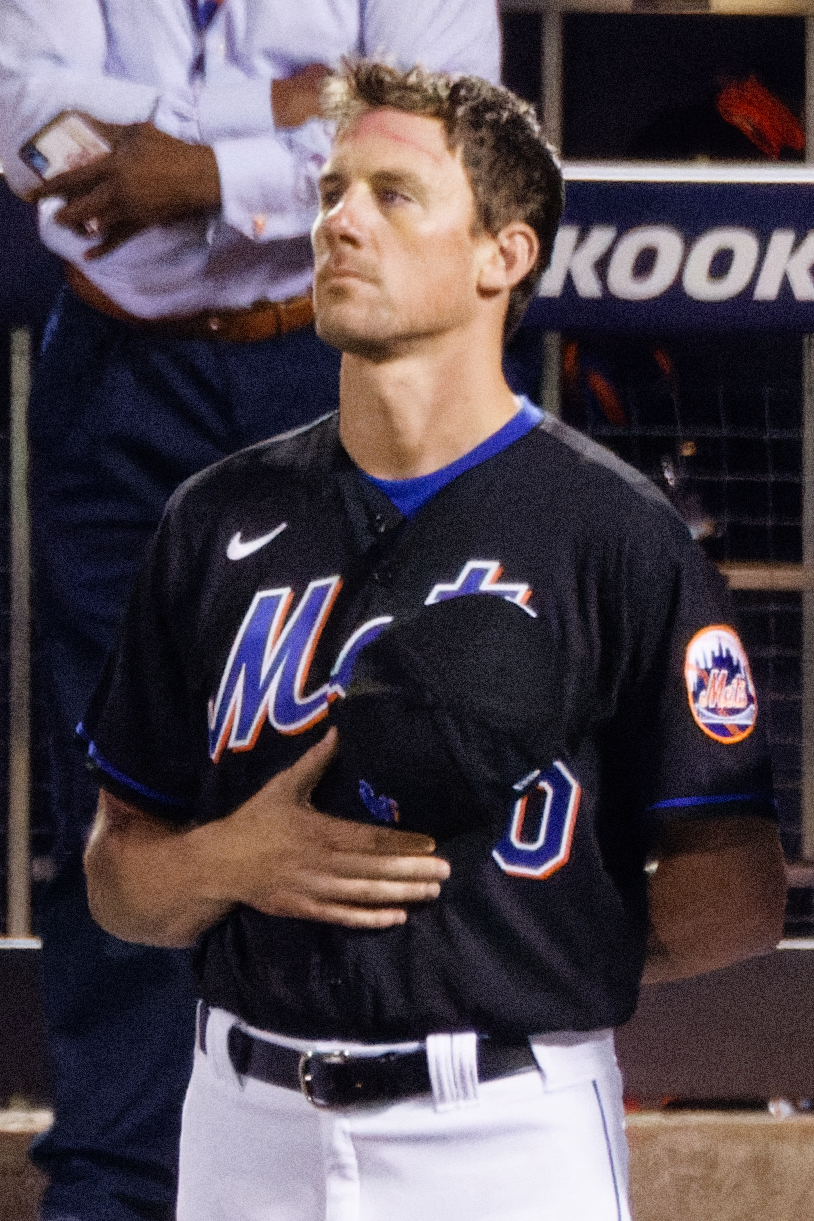
- Bassitt with the Mets in 2022

Free agent
- Pitcher
- Born: February 22, 1989 (age 37); Toledo, Ohio, U.S.
- Bats: Right Throws: Right

MLB debut
- August 30, 2014, for the Chicago White Sox

MLB statistics (through 2026 season)
- Win–loss record: 92–70
- Earned run average: 3.71
- Strikeouts: 1,265
- Stats at Baseball Reference

Teams
- Chicago White Sox (2014); Oakland Athletics (2015–2016, 2018–2021); New York Mets (2022); Toronto Blue Jays (2023–2025); Baltimore Orioles (2026)

Career highlights and awards
- All-Star (2021); AL wins leader (2023)

Christopher Michael Bassitt (born February 22, 1989) is an American professional baseball pitcher who is a free agent. He has previously played in Major League Baseball (MLB) for the Chicago White Sox, Oakland Athletics, New York Mets, Toronto Blue Jays, and Baltimore Orioles. He made his MLB debut with the White Sox in 2014. Prior to playing professionally, he starred for his basketball and baseball teams at Genoa Area High School and the University of Akron.

== Amateur career ==
Bassitt attended Genoa Area High School in Genoa, Ohio, where he played for his school's baseball and basketball teams. In his senior year, Bassitt was named to the All-Suburban Lakes League first team in both sports. He had a 1.56 earned run average (ERA) with 65 strikeouts in 56 innings pitched for the baseball team in 2007, his senior year.

Bassitt was recruited out of high school to play basketball collegiately. He chose to enroll at the University of Akron, where he played college baseball for the Akron Zips baseball team, competing in the Mid-American Conference (MAC). Bassitt took a redshirt in his first year at Akron. In 2009, as a redshirt freshman, Bassitt served as the Zips' closer. He pitched to a 1–2 win–loss record, a 3.52 ERA, and seven saves. In his sophomore year, he pitched in only one game, as he focused on academics. In 2011, his junior year, Bassitt pitched to a 1.42 ERA and limited opposing batters to a .183 batting average against. He was named to the All-MAC second team.

== Professional career ==
=== Chicago White Sox ===
==== Minor leagues ====
The Chicago White Sox selected Bassitt in the 16th round of the 2011 Major League Baseball draft, with the 501st overall selection. Bassitt signed with the White Sox, and was assigned to the Bristol White Sox of the Rookie-level Appalachian League to begin his professional career. In 2013, he began the season with the Winston-Salem Dash of the High–A Carolina League, where he was named an all-star. He was promoted to the Birmingham Barons of the Double–A Southern League, and recorded two wins in the Southern League playoffs. After working as a relief pitcher for most of his career, the White Sox used Bassitt as a starting pitcher in 2013. He had pitched to an 11–4 win–loss record, a 3.08 ERA, and 138 strikeouts in 26 games started with Birmingham. After the season, the White Sox assigned him to the Arizona Fall League (AFL), where he pitched in relief for the Glendale Desert Dogs. In the AFL, he had a 0.90 ERA in ten innings pitched.

Bassitt broke his right hand prior to the 2014 season. He made three rehabilitative appearances with the Arizona White Sox of the Rookie-level Arizona League, before returning to Birmingham on July 29. He had a 3–1 record and a 1.56 ERA with 36 strikeouts in 34 2/3 innings for Birmingham.

==== Major leagues ====
On August 30, 2014, Bassitt made his major league debut in a start against the Detroit Tigers. He had a 3.94 ERA in six appearances with the White Sox. After the regular season, the White Sox assigned Bassitt to Glendale of the AFL, where he had a 0.69 ERA in 13 innings, striking out 22 batters while walking only three.

=== Oakland Athletics ===
After the 2014 season, the White Sox traded Bassitt, Josh Phegley, Marcus Semien, and Rangel Ravelo to the Oakland Athletics in exchange for Jeff Samardzija and Michael Ynoa. Bassitt began the 2015 season with the Nashville Sounds of the Triple–A Pacific Coast League, and was promoted to the major leagues on April 23. In 18 games (13 starts), Bassitt finished 1–8 with a 3.56 ERA.

Bassitt's 2016 season became short-lived after 5 starts with a 0–2 record and a 6.11 ERA. On May 5, 2016, it was announced that Bassitt would undergo Tommy John surgery, putting him aside for the rest of 2016. He missed more than half of the 2017 season while recovering from surgery. He was recalled on June 9, 2018, to the A's rotation, his first start in 2 years. He was sent down and back up to the Majors in the following 2 weeks. On March 26, 2019, Bassitt was placed on the injured list with a leg injury. Bassitt finished the season with a record of 10–5 in 28 games (25 starts). He struck out 141 batters in 144 innings.

In the pandemic-shortened 2020 season, Bassitt posted a 5–2 record with a 2.29 ERA in 11 starts. He was named the American League Pitcher of the Month for September that year, as during that month he went 3–0 in four starts while allowing only one run in 26 2/3 innings.

On May 27, 2021, Bassitt threw his first career complete game against the Los Angeles Angels. He gave up just 2 hits while striking out 9 batters in a 5–0 win. On August 17, 2021, Bassitt was struck in the face by a line drive and exited on a motorized stretcher. He returned to the mound later in the season on September 23, 2021.

=== New York Mets ===
On March 12, 2022, the Athletics traded Bassitt to the New York Mets in exchange for J. T. Ginn and Adam Oller. Bassitt and the Mets avoided arbitration by agreeing to a contract worth $8.65 million for the 2022 season with a $19 million option or a $150,000 buyout for the 2023 season. On November 8, 2022, Bassitt opted out of his contract and elected free agency, receiving a $150,000 buyout.

=== Toronto Blue Jays ===
On December 16, 2022, Bassitt signed a three-year, $63 million contract with the Toronto Blue Jays. On May 12, 2023, Bassitt threw a complete-game shutout against the Atlanta Braves, his first with the Blue Jays; Bassitt only allowed two hits in the contest. Later that year Bassitt was nominated for the All-MLB Team. Bassitt made 33 total starts for Toronto during the regular season, compiling a 16-8 record and 3.60 ERA with 186 strikeouts over 200 innings of work.

Bassitt started 31 contests for the Blue Jays in the 2024 campaign, registering a 10-14 record and 4.16 ERA with 168 strikeouts across 171 innings pitched. He made 32 appearances (including 31 starts) for Toronto in 2025, posting an 11-9 record and 3.96 ERA with 166 strikeouts across 170 1/3 innings pitched.

=== Baltimore Orioles ===
On February 13, 2026, Bassitt signed a one-year, $18.5 million contract with the Baltimore Orioles. On June 8, Bassitt was placed on the injured list due to low back discomfort. On June 28, it was reported that Bassitt had undergone a minor surgery to remove a bone spur from his back. He was transferred to the 60–day injured list on July 17. Bassitt was activated from the injured list on August 14.

== Scouting report ==
Bassitt throws eight pitches, a four-seam and sinker that range between 92–96 miles per hour (148–154 km/h), a cut fastball at 84–91 miles per hour (135–146 km/h), a slider at 85–89 miles per hour (137–143 km/h), a changeup at 82–85 miles per hour (132–137 km/h), a splitter at 81–84 miles per hour (130–135 km/h), a sweeper at 72–74 miles per hour (116–119 km/h), and a curveball at 69–75 miles per hour (111–121 km/h). Bassitt throws with great deception, as most of his pitches have either a lot of rise or a lot of break.
