= Globe High School =

- Home of the Tigers

Location
- 501 S. High Street; Globe, Arizona 85501; United States; 33°23′34″N 110°46′53″W

Information
- Type: Public high school
- School district: Globe Unified School District
- CEEB code: 030150
- Principal: Jeremiah Johnson
- Teaching staff: 22.00 (FTE)
- Grades: 9-12
- Enrollment: 508 (2023–2024)
- Student to teacher ratio: 23.09
- Colors: Orange and black
- Mascot: Tigers
- Website: ghs.globeschools.org

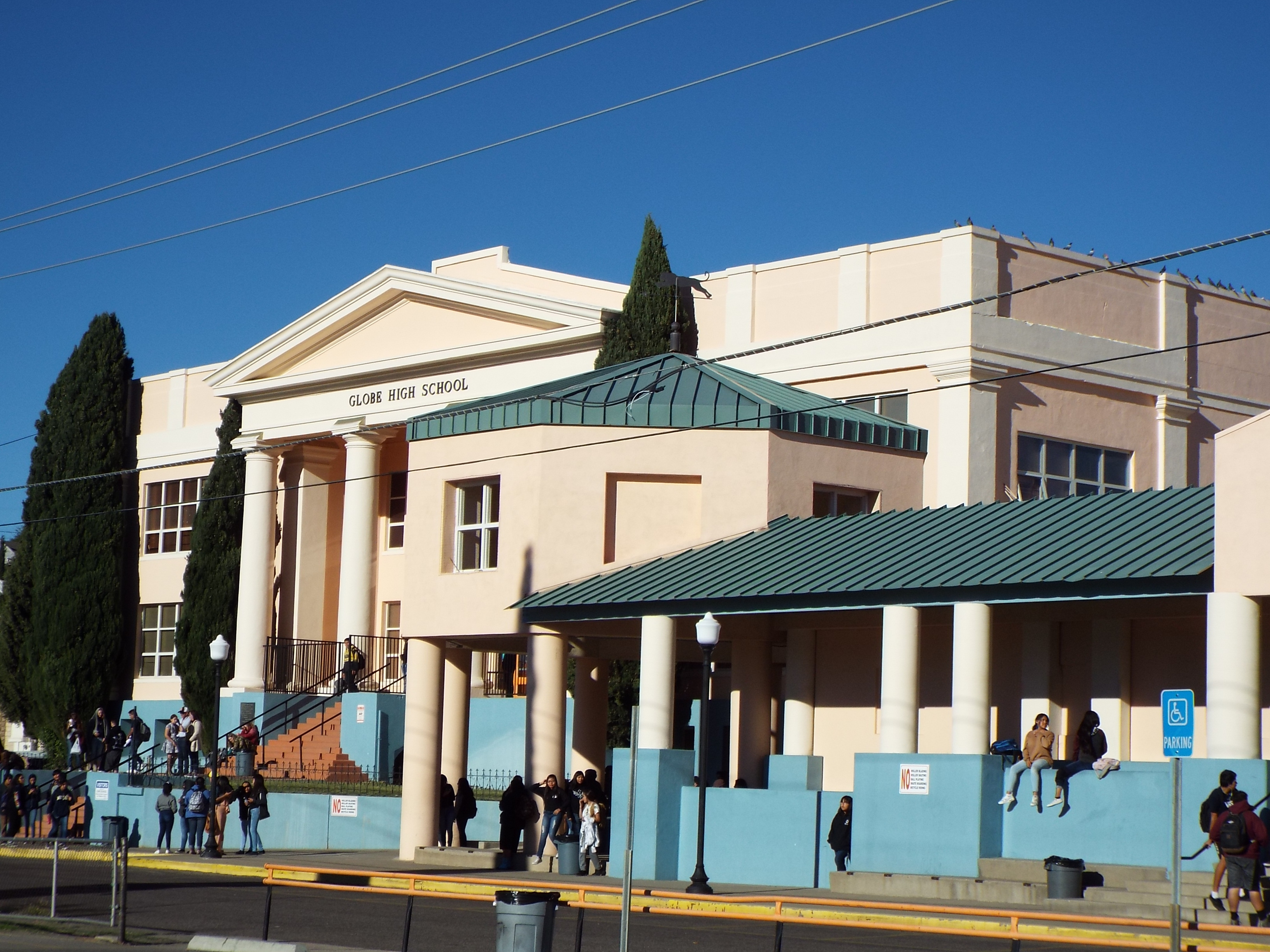
Globe High School

Globe High School is a high school in Globe, Arizona. It is the only high school in the Globe Unified School District, which also operates High Desert Middle School and Copper Rim Elementary School.

== History ==
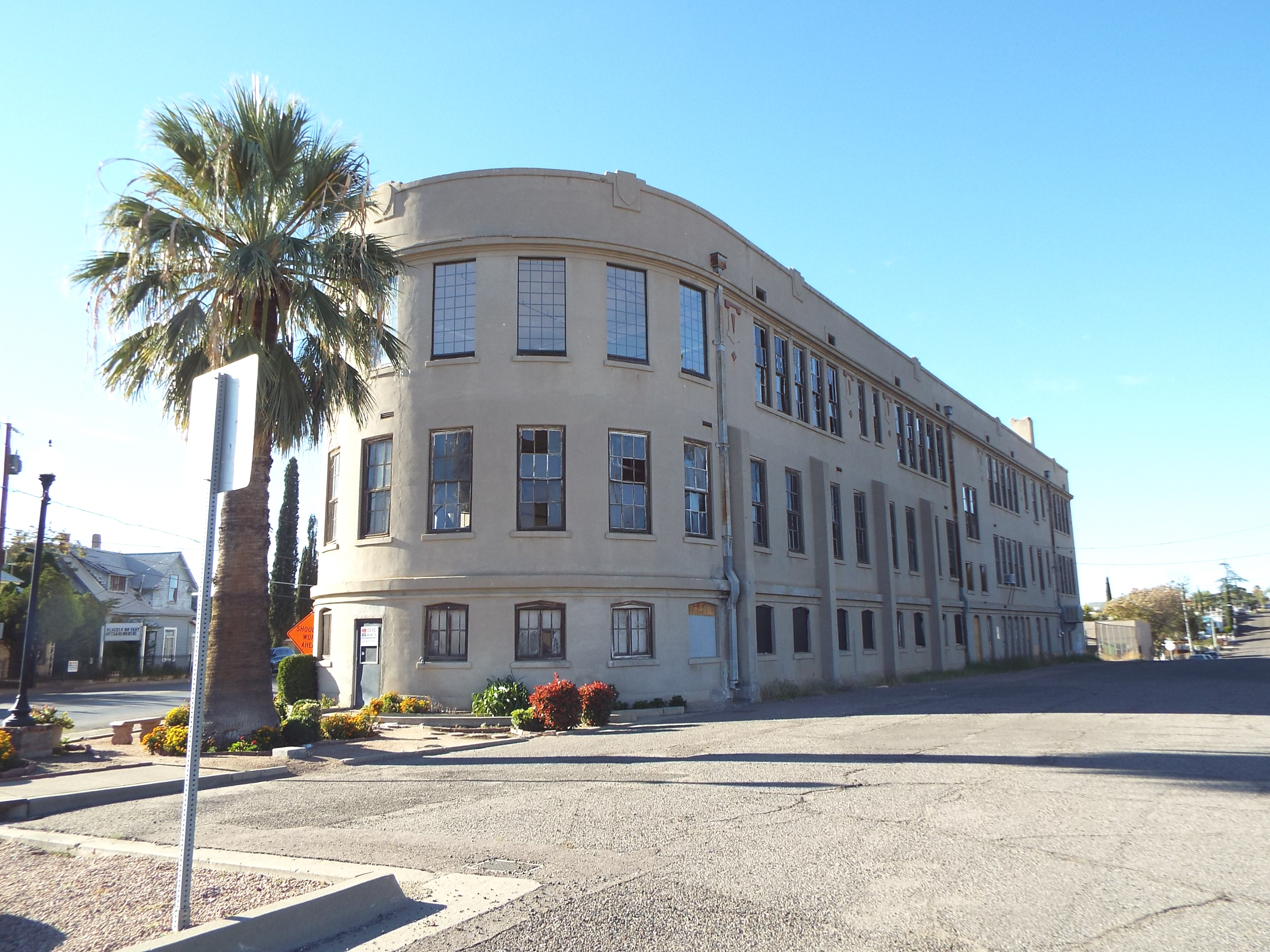
Hill Street School

High school classes were originally held at the Central School. Overcrowding forced the construction of a new facility, and the first Globe High School building was constructed in 1913 and completed the next year. The building had two stories and a basement, and it held 250 students in grades 7 through 12. In 1920, a third story was added on top for the junior high school. Other facilities in the building have included a cafeteria, garage, and locker rooms in the basement, plus caretaker housing in the current nurse's office on the main floor.

The first Globe-Miami football game was played in 1924, starting a major rivalry that later spawned the creation of the "G" and "M" hills in each town in 1934, in an attempt to curb vandalism at the schools, and the Copper Kettle trophy, cast in 1947. The game was played on Thanksgiving until 1965, when Arizona's early football schedule forced it to be moved.

Globe High School first expanded to another building in 1949, when former tennis courts made way for a gymnasium and cafeteria. The school received additional space to grow when a separate junior high school was built in 1956 and a science, music and shop wing was added on in 1964.

The building received a major renovation in 1994 to add carpeted floors, electrical outlets, and central air, as well as to remove of the original leaded glass windows. Today, it is one of the oldest buildings in the state continuously used for education.

== Notable alumni ==
- Rose Mofford, governor of Arizona
- Sam Ybarra, soldier accused of involvement in war crimes during the Vietnam War

== See also ==
- Globe, Arizona
- List of historic properties in Globe, Arizona
