= Genoa Area High School =

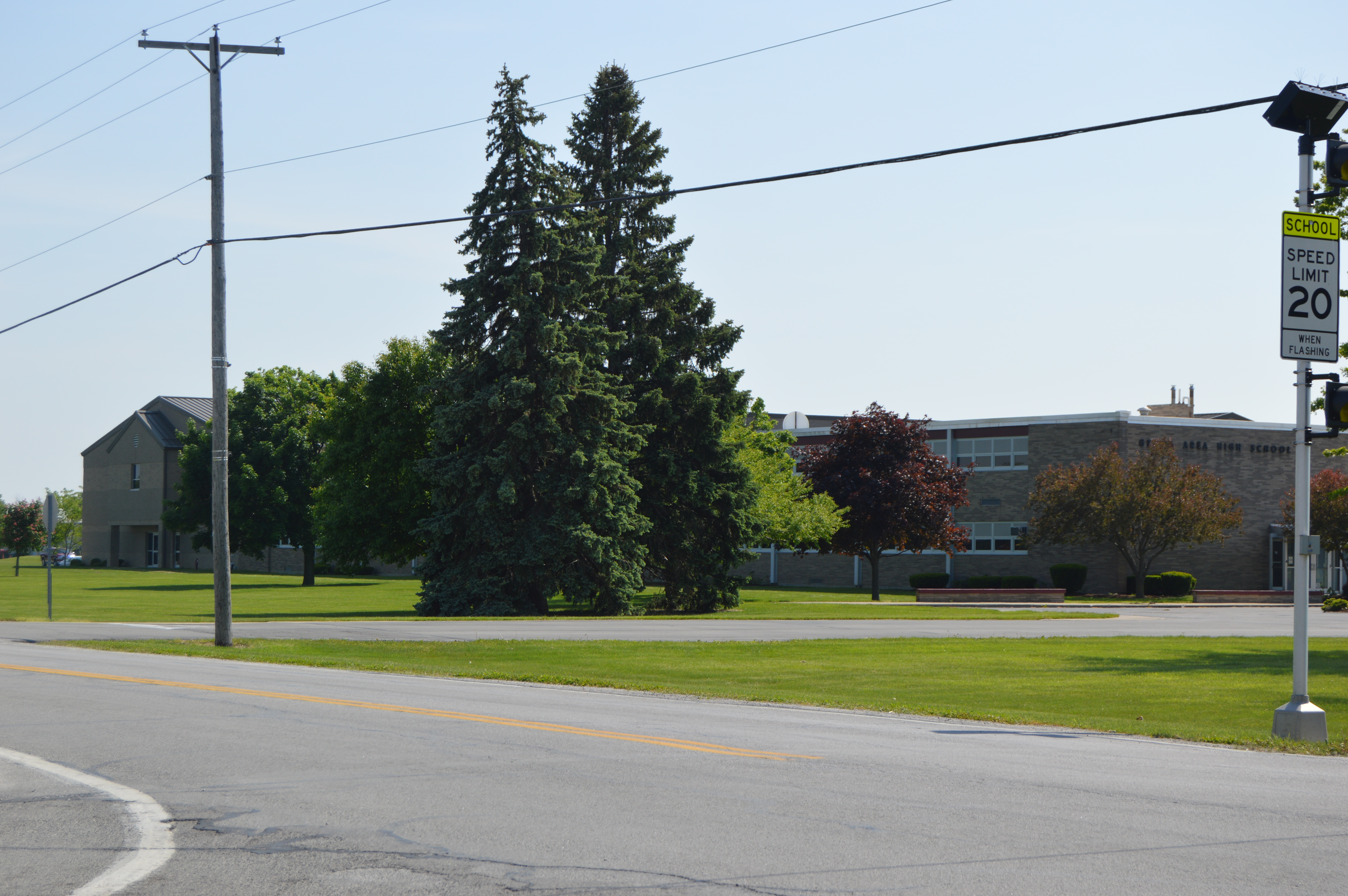

Location
- 2980 North Genoa-Clay Center Road; Genoa, Ohio 43430; United States
- 41°33′20″N 83°21′44″W

Information
- Type: Public
- School district: Genoa Area Local School District
- Superintendent: Cody McPherson
- Principal: Brian Cannon
- Teaching staff: 22.00 (FTE)
- Grades: 9–12
- Enrollment: 409 (2023–2024)
- Student to teacher ratio: 18.59
- Colors: Maroon and Gray
- Athletics conference: Northern Buckeye Conference
- Mascot: Comet
- Website: www.genoaschools.com/o/ghs

Genoa Area High School is a public high school near Genoa, Ohio, United States. It is the only high school in the Genoa Area Local School District. Other towns in the district are Curtice, Clay Center, Martin, and Williston.

The nickname for the athletic teams is the Comets. Genoa became a charter member of the Northern Buckeye Conference in 2011. It was a charter member of the Suburban Lakes League in 1972, the Northern Lakes League in 1956 and the Sandusky Bay Conference in 1948.

There is one K-5 elementary school in the Genoa Area School District, Genoa Area Local Elementary School. This school was opened in the 2011–2012 school year replacing former elementary schools Brunner Elementary and Allen Central Elementary. Allen was closed and razed following the 2010–2011 school year while Brunner was closed and sold off. There is one middle school, named after former football coach, principal, and board president, John C. Roberts . All three schools, Genoa Area Local Elementary School, John C. Roberts Middle School (opened in the 2002 school year), and Genoa Area High School (opened in 1963) which had an auditorium built that opened in 1969, are conveniently located within close proximity of each other on one educational campus.

== Ohio High School Athletic Association State Championships ==
- Boys Wrestling – 2018, 2019
- Boys Wrestling-Dual Meet - 2018, 2019

== Notable alumni ==
- Chris Bassitt
- Michael Deiter
- Joe Mahr
- Bill Nolte
- Jackie Wolcott
