= Tiger Force =

- The patch of Tiger Force
- Active: November 1965 – November 1969 (Vietnam)
- Country: United States
- Branch: United States Army
- Type: Special operations forces
- Size: 45
- Part of: XVIII Airborne Corps
- Garrison/HQ: Fort Campbell (1st Battalion, 327th Infantry Regiment, 1st Brigade)
- Engagements: Vietnam War
- Decorations: United States Presidential Unit Citation

Commanders
- Notable commanders: David Hackworth

Tiger Force was a long-range reconnaissance patrol unit of the United States Army's 101st Airborne Division which served in the Vietnam War. Organizationally part of the 327th Infantry Regiment's 1st Battalion (Airborne) in the 101st Airborne Division's 1st Brigade (Separate), the unit was founded by Major David Hackworth and primarily active from November 1965 to November 1967. It gained notoriety after investigations during the course of the war and decades afterwards revealed the unit had committed extensive war crimes against hundreds of Vietnamese civilians. Hackworth, who left Vietnam before the unit began committing war crimes, claimed he was unaware of Tiger Force's atrocities and refused to speculate on why they occurred.

== Composition ==
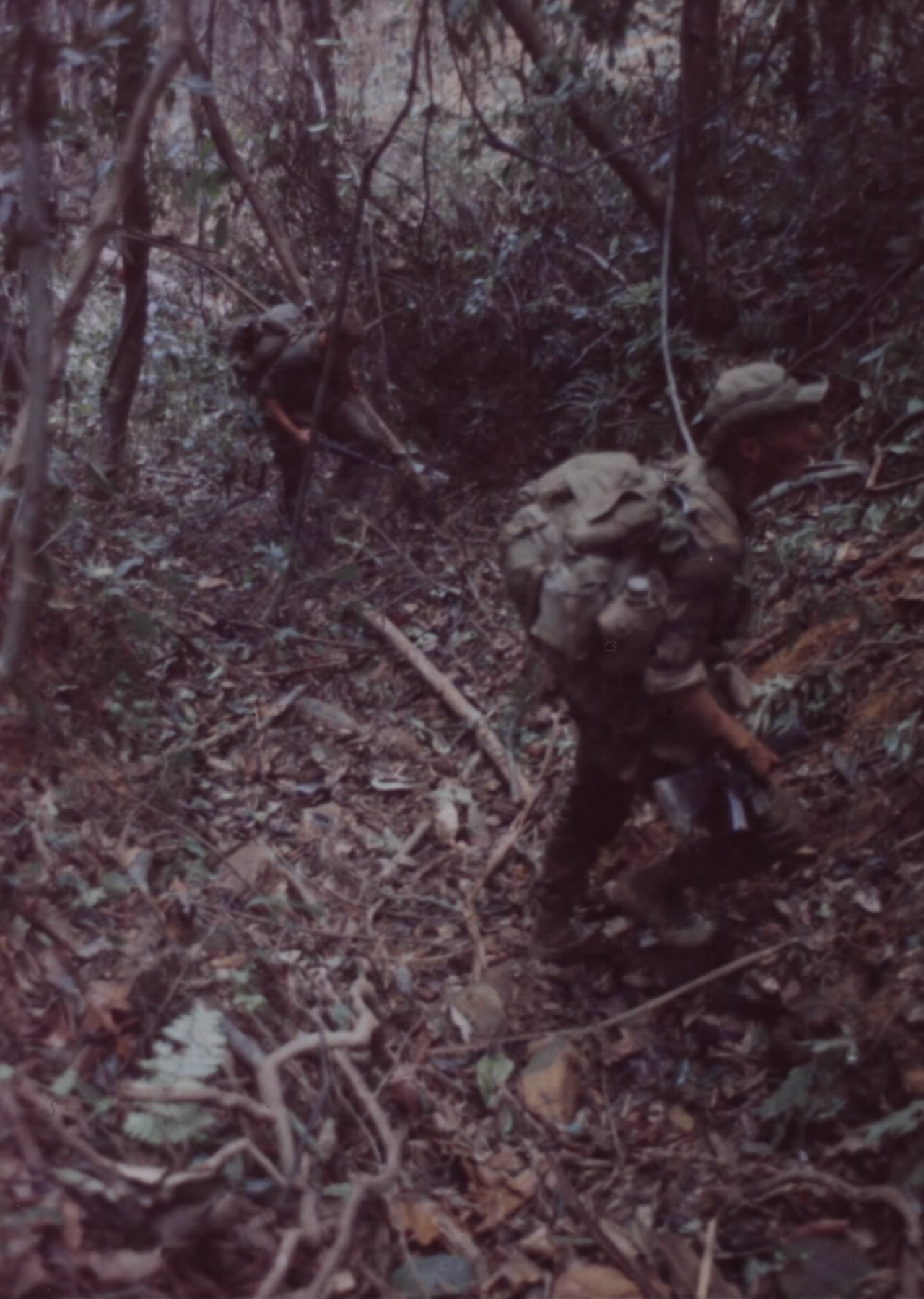
Members of Tiger Force move along an infiltration trail, 1968

The platoon-sized unit, approximately 45 paratroopers, was organized by Major David Hackworth in November 1965 to "outguerrilla the guerrillas". Tiger Force (Recon) 1-327th was a highly decorated small unit in Vietnam, and paid for its reputation with heavy casualties. In October 1968, Tiger Force's parent battalion was awarded the Presidential Unit Citation by President Lyndon B. Johnson, which included a mention of Tiger Force's service at Đắk Tô in June 1966.

== Investigations of war crimes ==
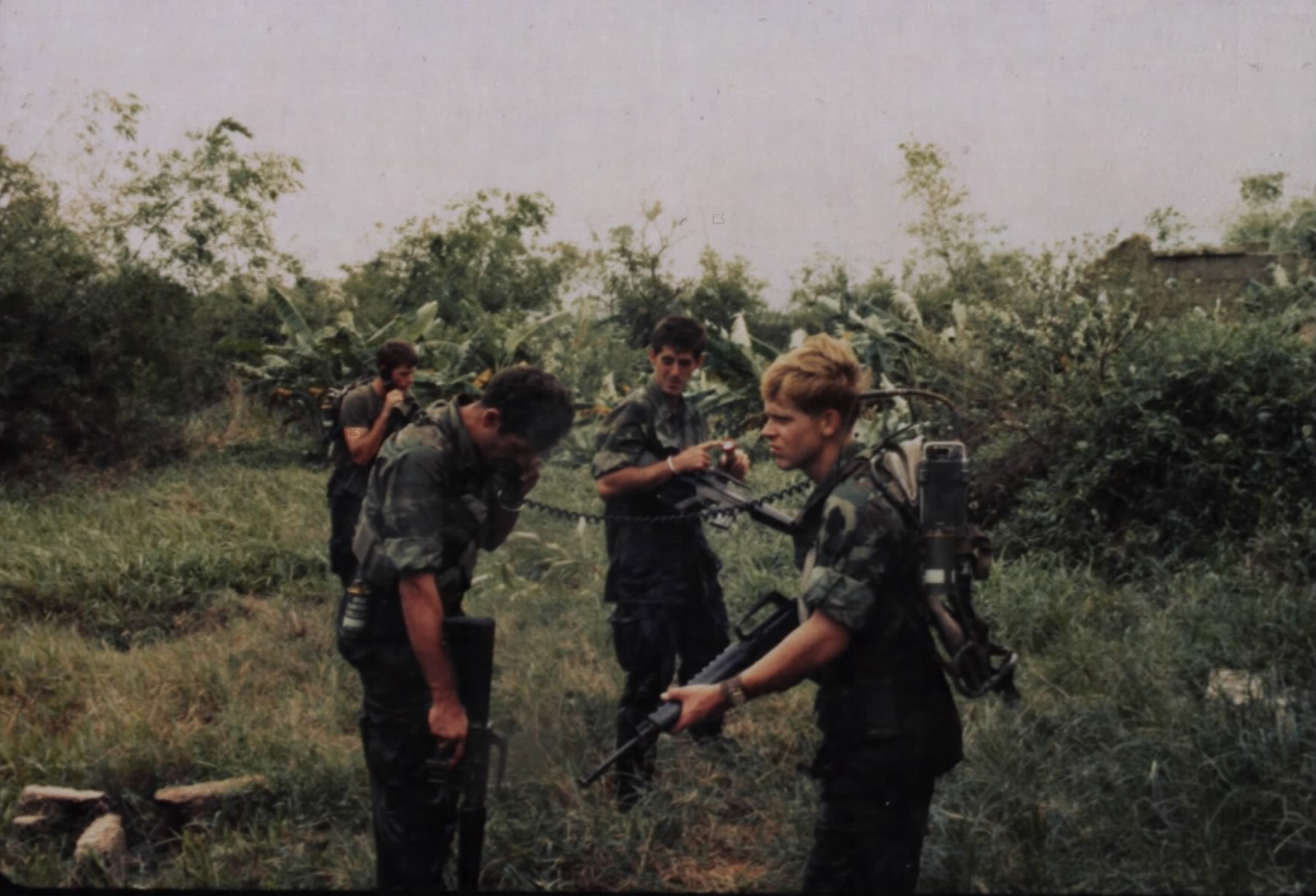
Recon. Platoon leader, 1st Battalion, 327th Infantry, uses an AN/PRC-25 radio to check with his command helicopter for new directions, 1969

On October 19, 2003, Michael D. Sallah, a reporter for The Toledo Blade newspaper, obtained unreleased, confidential records of U.S. Army commander Henry Tufts. One file in these records referred to a previously unpublished war crimes investigation known as the Coy Allegation. To investigate this further, Sallah gained access to a large collection of documents produced by the investigation held at the National Archives in College Park, Maryland.

Sallah found that between 1971 and 1975, the Army's Criminal Investigation Command had investigated the Tiger Force unit for alleged war crimes committed between May and November 1967. The documents included sworn statements from many Tiger Force veterans, which detailed war crimes allegedly committed by Tiger Force members during the Song Ve Valley and Operation Wheeler military campaigns. The statements, from both individuals who allegedly participated in the war crimes and those that did not, described war crimes such as the following:

- the routine torture and execution of prisoners
- the routine practice of intentionally killing unarmed Vietnamese villagers including men, women, children, and elderly people
- the routine practice of cutting off and collecting the ears of victims
- the practice of wearing necklaces composed of human ears
- the practice of cutting off and collecting the scalps of victims
- incidents where soldiers planted weapons on murdered Vietnamese villagers
- an incident where a young mother was drugged, raped, and then executed
- an incident where a soldier killed a baby and cut off the baby's head after the baby's mother was killed

The investigators concluded that many of the war crimes took place. This included the murder of former ARVN personnel, the murder of two blind brothers, and the routine murder of women, children, and disabled or elderly civilians. Despite these conclusions, the Army decided not to pursue any prosecutions.

High bodycounts were recognized and encouraged by military officials. Colonel Gerald Morse ordered troops of the 327th Infantry Regiment, of which Tiger Force was part of, to rack up a body count of 327 during Operation Wheeler in order to match the battalion's infantry designation, 327th. Those killed were all listed as enemy combatants. Tiger Force's Sam Ybarra was congratulated in the Stars and Stripes military newspaper for the 1,000th kill of Operation Wheeler.

After studying the documents, Sallah and fellow reporter, Mitch Weiss, located and interviewed dozens of veterans who served in Tiger Force during the period in question as well as the United States Army Criminal Investigation Division (CID) investigators who later carried out the Army's inquiry. The reporters also traveled to Vietnam and tracked down numerous residents of Song Ve Valley who identified themselves as witnesses. Sallah and Weiss reported that the war crimes were corroborated by both veterans and Song Ve Valley residents. The reporters also managed to track down dozens of additional investigative records not included in the National Archives.

The reporters published their findings in a series of articles in The Toledo Blade in October 2003. The New York Times subsequently performed their own investigation, contacting a few Tiger Force veterans and corroborating The Toledo Blade's findings.

Since The Blade's story, the United States Army has opened a review of the former Tiger Force investigation, but has not yet provided much additional information. On May 11, 2004, Lt. Col. Pamela Hart informed The Blade reporters that she had been too busy responding to prisoner abuse by U.S. soldiers in Iraq to check on the status of the Tiger Force case. The Blade has not reported on any more recent updates from the U.S. Army.

Reporters Michael D. Sallah, Mitch Weiss, and Joe Mahr received a number of awards for their series:

- In 2003, the reporters won the Investigative Reporters and Editors (IRE) Medal.
- In 2003, the reporters won the Sigma Delta Chi Award for investigative reporting, for publications with a circulation of 100,000 or greater.
- In 2004, the reporters won the Taylor Family Award for Fairness in Newspapers.
- In 2004, the reporters won the Pulitzer Prize for Investigative Reporting.

In 2006, Sallah, now an investigative reporter with The Washington Post, and Weiss, an investigative reporter with the Associated Press, co-authored a book chronicling their findings: Tiger Force: A True Story of Men and War (2006).

== Notable former members, 1965–1969 ==
- Col. David Hackworth, unit founder
- Lt. Dennis Foley
- Lt. James Hawkins (implicated in leading nearly all controversial events) Hawkins was a battlefield-commissioned second lieutenant. Hawkins attributes the lack of charges to the timing of the investigation after My Lai and Bumgarner the potential for additional bad "publicity."
- Lt. James A. Gardner (awarded the Medal of Honor, posthumously) killed in action, before any of the controversial events
- Lt. William F. Kernan
- Lt. Donald Wood (whistleblower)
- Lt. Skip Franks (whistleblower)
- Staff Sgt. Dennis Stout (whistleblower)
- Ssg. John G. Gertsch (awarded the Medal of Honor, posthumously) killed in action
- Sgt. Gerald Bruner (whistleblower)
- Spc. William Carpenter (whistleblower)
- Spc. Kenneth Leon Green, killed in action
- Pvt. Rion Causey (whistleblower)
- Pvt. Kenneth Kerney (whistleblower)
- Pvt. Sam Ybarra

== In popular culture ==
- In the 2014 book Edge of Eternity by Ken Follett, character Jasper Murray is enlisted in the military and assigned to Tiger Force in Vietnam. He witnesses and is forced to participate in several war crimes, such as rape and murder of a Vietnamese family and using Vietnamese peasants as "mine dogs" to detect mines and traps laid by Viet Cong.

== See also ==
Vietnam War

- Phoenix Program
- Operation Speedy Express
- Former United States special operations units
- Vietnam War Crimes Working Group Files

Broader, related topics

- Headhunting
- Human trophy collecting
- Medical torture
- Mimizuka
- War crimes committed by the United States
