= The Buckets =

Comic strip

- Author(s): Scott Stantis; Greg Cravens
- Current status/schedule: Running
- Launch date: April 22, 1990
- Syndicate(s): Tribune Media Services (1990–1994); United Features Syndicate (1994-2011); Universal Uclick/Andrews McMeel Syndication (2011-present)
- Genre(s): Humor, Family

The Buckets is a comic strip originally created by Scott Stantis. It has been syndicated since 1990, currently by Andrews McMeel Syndication. The comic centers on a suburban family of five; two parents, two boys, Toby, a moody adolescent and Eddie, a young boy, and their paternal grandfather. The Stantis family pet, Dogzilla, was the only character to keep his own name when Scott first created the strip based on his own family. The real world Dogzilla died in 2006 at the age of 17. Greg Cravens had sole responsibility of the strip at Dogzilla's death, and says Dogzilla will live on in the comic strip. His own dog is named Gi'Tli, which is Cherokee for 'Dog'.

Stantis left The Buckets completely to focus on politically oriented Prickly City and The Buckets is currently being handled by Greg Cravens. Cravens was hired just after the tenth anniversary of the strip. He went from being the art assistant to credited art assistant to partner and eventually sole writer and artist of the strip.

The two sons in the strip, Toby and Eddie, began as younger characters. Eddie was a toddler and Toby was a first grader or kindergartener. As the strip progressed, the children aged, but not at the same rate. For writing and humor purposes, Toby landed at age 15, and Eddie at age 6.

== Main characters ==
- Francis Denver "Bronco" Bucket - Larry's father, and grandfather to Toby and Eddie. He's your typical crotchety old man - rough to his adult kids, and friends, but usually soft and gentle to his grandsons. He lives in the house with his son, daughter-in-law, and grandsons.
- Larry Bucket - The father of the house. He is a typical dim-witted, loving, hardworking husband. Larry was born between 1945 and 1968.
- Sarah Bucket (née Smyrna) - The mother of the house. She used to be a high school nurse. She and Larry had Toby when Sarah was roughly 30 years old.
- Toby Bucket - The oldest child. He was in 1st grade when the comic began. Sometime in the early 2000s he was aged up, and has stayed at around 15 years old, and in grade nine for over 2 decades.
- Eddie Bucket - The rambunctious 6 year old and youngest child. He's got wit and adorableness going for him. When the strip started, he was still in diapers, but was brought up to age 6 for comedic purposes.

== Recurring characters ==
Toby has a girlfriend and several named and unnamed friends who've shown up. Eddie and Grandpa have their play- and complain-friends respectively. Larry has several coworkers at his office job and associates at sports.

And there is Dogzilla, the pet, that most closely resembles and is referred to being a dog.
