= Joe Mahr =

American investigative journalist

Joe Mahr is an American investigative journalist, who won the 2004 Pulitzer Prize for Investigative Reporting.

== Life ==
He was born in Genoa, Ohio and attended Genoa Area High School and the Honors Tutorial College at Ohio University, where he obtained his undergraduate degree in journalism.

In 2004, Mahr was awarded the 2004 Pulitzer Prize for Investigative Reporting along with Mitch Weiss and Michael D. Sallah, for a series on the atrocities committed by Tiger Force, a U.S. Army platoon during the Vietnam War. The trio also received The Medal by Investigative Reporters & Editors; a first-place Sigma Delta Chi Award for investigative reporting; a first-place Nieman Award presented by the Nieman Foundation for Journalism at Harvard University, and a first-place award for investigative reporting by Associated Press Society of Ohio.

His Chicago Tribune article about police corruption in Harvey, Illinois, co-authored by Joseph Ryan and Matthew Walberg, was a finalist for the Pulitzer Prize.

His investigative work for the Toledo Blade also included an investigation into allegations that the police in Toledo refused to arrest or investigate abusive priests In addition to his Pulitzer Prize–winning work, Mahr has also written a series of stories looking at abuse and neglect in the mental health system for the St. Louis Post-Dispatch.

He currently writes for the Chicago Tribune where he was a finalist for the 2015 Pulitzer Prize for Local Reporting for his coverage of government corruption in the Chicago suburb of Harvey, IL.
