= Bill Nolte =

- Born: June 4, 1953 (age 72); Toledo, Ohio, United States
- Education: Bowling Green State University Cincinnati College-Conservatory of Music
- Occupations: actor, singer, watercolorist, teacher
- Years active: 1985–present
- Website: www.billnolte.com

Bill Nolte (born June 4 in Toledo, Ohio) is a singer and Broadway actor. He was raised in Genoa, Ohio and attended Genoa Area High School, graduating in 1971. He graduated from the Cincinnati College-Conservatory of Music in 1976, with a degree in Opera and Musical Theater and a minor in Musical Theater.

== Theatre credits ==
Bill made his Broadway debut in 1985, Old Deuteronomy in the Andrew Lloyd Webber musical Cats. Subsequently, he's appeared on Broadway in Me and My Girl, Joseph and the Amazing Technicolor Dreamcoat (1993–1994), 1776 (1997–1998), King David as Golliath, Jane Eyre, and Amour, as well as the original album for Jekyll & Hyde alongside Anthony Warlow.

Beginning in 2005, he performed the role of Franz Liebkind and served as understudy Max Bialystock in the Broadway musical adaptation of The Producers after playing the role for 2 years on tour.

Nolte played Tabarro and understudied the role of Georges in the 2010–11 Broadway revival of La Cage aux Folles.

Mansour in The Road to Qatar – 2011, at the York Theatre

Benjamin Prick in The Little Pricks – 2012, with The Gold Dust Orphans in Boston, MA

Fuzz in HARMONY, KANSAS – 2012, at the Diversionary Theatre in San Diego, CA. WORLD PREMIERE.

Tony in THE MOST HAPPY FELLA – 2012, Lyric Stage in Irving, TX.

Starring as Tony in Goodspeed Opera House's (CT.) new production of The Most Happy Fella – 2013

He has performed his solo cabaret acts: IS NOTHING SACRED, BILLSVILLE, TOGETHER AT LAST, ALL OF ME and ON BROADWAY in venues like BIRDLAND, TRIAD, SEABOURNE SPIRIT CRUISES, LAS VEGAS PERFORMING ARTS SOCIETY and recently at IRIDIUM in NY at the VON FREEMAN AFTERPARTY with Shirley Jordan.

In 2018, he joined the Broadway cast of Waitress as Old Joe and reprised the role on the national tour.

== Awards ==
- 2012 SCENIE AWARD for Best Ensemble Performance in HARMONY, KANSAS at the DIVERSIONARY THEATRE.
- 2000 Gypsy Robe for playing Richard Mason in JANE EYRE (2000–2001)
- 1993 Gypsy Robe for playing Issachar in JOSEPH AND THE AMAZING TECHNICOLOR DREAMCOAT (1993–1994)
- 1987 "DISTINGUISHED ALUMNUS" Award from The Cincinnati College-Conservatory of Music
- 1982 TOMMY AWARD given by the American Council of Prints to his design for Concord Fabrics in NYC
