= Soldiers for the Truth Foundation =

American advocacy organization

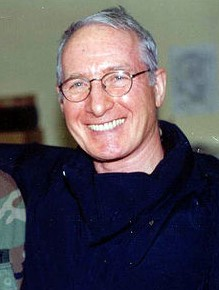
Col. David H. Hackworth

The Soldiers for the Truth Foundation is a 501(c)(3) public charity organization in the United States dedicated to military reform. Its stated mission is to inform the public, Congress, and the media on issues related to the training, readiness, equipment and leadership of US armed forces. The Foundation is registered as a non-profit organization under section 501(c)(3) of the Internal Revenue Code. Notable issues in which the foundation has been involved include campaigning for better body armor for troops serving in Iraq and contributing to coverage of the abuse of prisoners at Abu Ghraib.

Soldiers for the Truth claims a membership of 20,000 and publishes an online magazine called Defense Watch criticising the country's military leadership using information provided by active servicemen and women.

== History and organization ==
Soldiers for the Truth grew out of the regular opinion pieces written by David H. Hackworth from the early 1990s on, originally titled "Defending America". Though donations are solicited from readers, Col. Hackworth also used the profits from his own book sales to help fund the organization. Weekly email newsletters were composed by a group of like-minded veterans, their friends and spouses, including R.W. Zimmermann, Bill Rogers, Ray Starmann, Kate Aspy, Barry "Woody" Groton, Ed "Edgar" Schneider, and Kyle Elliot. Later contributors included author and civilian security analyst Paul Purcell, and Lt. Col. Karen Kwiatkowski, a whistleblower who criticised the Pentagon's Office of Special Plans as "Orwellian". Other authors included former Editor in Chief Ed Offley, Paul Connors, Matt Dodd and Roger Perry.

As of 2007, the foundation's board included Hackworth's widow Eilhys England, Maj. John Falcon, US Army Retired and Lt. Col. Gary Stahlhut, US Army Reserve Retired.

== Activities ==
In October 2001, as the American military prepared for its campaign in Afghanistan, Col. Hackworth assessed the readiness level of most of the troops as follows: "I would be reluctant to jump into a battle zone with any conventional American unit. I would hate to take them into battle - they ain't ready, they are not 'good to go'." He was also critical of the 'elite' troops who were expected to lead the assault. Hackworth has repeatedly stated the American military is weakened by a combination of senior officers who are primarily concerned about their own careers above the welfare and training of their troops, and a culture of misdirected and wasteful expenditure.

In May 2004, The New York Times reported Mr William Lawson, the uncle of an Army reservist serving as a prison guard in Iraq, contacted SFTT by email on 23 March to express his frustration the guards would become scapegoats for the abuse of prisoners at Abu Ghraib, when Lawson himself believed the abuses were "evidence of a complete breakdown in training and authority in the Iraqi prison system". Lawson wrote in his email: "We have contacted the Red Cross, Congress both parties, Bill O'Reilly and many others. Nobody wants to touch this." The staff at SFTT put Lawson in touch with researchers working for 60 Minutes II, which broadcast a documentary on the subject within five weeks.

In May 2007, incoming SFTT president John Falcon stated the Pentagon-approved "Interceptor" body armor, issued to US Marines serving in Iraq, did not provide adequate protection against armor-piercing bullets. Falcon said that according to a secret Pentagon report, 80% of marines killed due to torso wounds between 2003 and 2005 would have survived if they had been wearing adequate body armor. SFTT continues to campaign for soldiers to be issued with an allegedly tougher, more protective body armor called "Dragon Skin". Marines interviewed on the subject appreciated the group's campaign, saying, "Any time you get better equipment to the Marines, soldiers and sailors, it would make us that more dominant so it would be a good thing."

As of 2007, SFTT was preparing legal action to compel the Pentagon to acknowledge and assist Vietnam veterans who were exposed to the defoliant Agent Blue during the Vietnam War. The cause of Col. Hackworth's death was "a form of cancer now appearing with increasing frequency among Vietnam veterans exposed to the defoliants called Agents Orange and Blue".

The current President of the Board, Frederick Tanne, was instrumental in involving the law firm of Kirkland & Ellis LLP in filing the final motion with the Federal Court in Washington, DC in the Freedom of Information Act ("FOIA") on behalf of the SFTT's editor for forensic records held by the Department of Defense ("DOD").
