= David Hackworth =

American soldier and journalist (1930–2005)

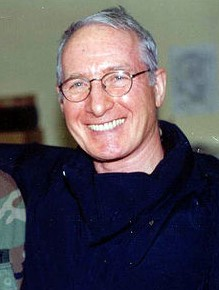
- Hackworth in Zagreb, Croatia in December 1995
- Born: David Haskell Hackworth; November 11, 1930; Ocean Park, California, U.S. (now Santa Monica, California, U.S.)
- Died: May 4, 2005 (aged 74); Tijuana, Mexico
- Burial place: Arlington National Cemetery
- Military career
- Allegiance: United States
- Branch: United States Merchant Marine; United States Army
- Service years: 1945 (U.S. Merchant Marine); 1946–1954, 1956–1971 (U.S. Army)
- Rank: Colonel
- Nicknames: "Hack", "Mr Infantry"
- Units: 88th Infantry Division; 25th Infantry Division; 40th Infantry Division; 101st Airborne Division; 9th Infantry Division
- Commands: Tiger Force; 4th Battalion, 39th Infantry Regiment
- Conflicts: World War II; Korean War; Vietnam War
- Awards: Distinguished Service Cross (2); Silver Star (10); Legion of Merit (4); Distinguished Flying Cross; Bronze Star Medal (8) with "V"; Purple Heart (8); Air Medal (34) with "V"; Army Commendation Medal (4) with "V"
- Other work: Author, journalist and restaurateur

Colonel David Haskell Hackworth (November 11, 1930 – May 4, 2005) was a United States Army officer and journalist, who was highly decorated in both the Korean War and Vietnam War. Hackworth is known for his role in the formation and command of Tiger Force, a military unit from the 101st Airborne Division that used guerrilla warfare tactics against Viet Cong in South Vietnam.

He was the youngest US colonel in Vietnam at the time of his promotion. He was described by General Creighton Abrams, who commanded all US military operations from 1968 to 1972 in Vietnam, as "the best battalion commander I ever saw in the United States Army."

== Early life ==
Hackworth was born in Ocean Park, California, now part of Santa Monica, on November 11, 1930, the son of Leroy E. Hackworth and Lorette (Kensly) Hackworth. His parents both died before he was a year old, so he and his brother and sister were raised by Ida Stedman, their paternal grandmother.

The family had to rely on government aid during the Great Depression, and his grandmother, who had been married to a Colorado gold miner, brought them up on tales of her Old West experiences and her Revolutionary War ancestors. While attending school in Santa Monica, Hackworth and a friend earned money by shining the shoes of soldiers stationed at bases in the area.

== Military career ==
World War II

Imbued with a sense of adventure, at age 14, Hackworth lied about his age and paid a transient to pose as his father so he could claim to be old enough to join the United States Merchant Marine with parental consent. In 1945 he served aboard a Merchant Marine ship in the South Pacific Ocean during the final months of World War II. After he returned home to California he decided to join the United States Army.

In 1946, he used his Merchant Marine documents to enlist for three years. After completing his initial training, he was assigned to post-war occupation duty as a rifleman in the 351st Infantry Regiment, 88th Infantry Division. Based in Trieste, his unit was part of Trieste United States Troops. While serving in Trieste, Hackworth earned his General Educational Development high-school equivalency diploma.

=== Korea ===
Hackworth fought with the 25th Reconnaissance Company and the 27th Infantry (Wolfhound) Regiment of the 25th Infantry Division during the Korean War. In 1951, he earned a battlefield commission as a second lieutenant and was awarded three Silver Stars for heroism and three Purple Hearts. After a successful raid on Hill 1062 and battlefield promotion to first lieutenant, the commander of the 27th Infantry Regiment offered Hackworth command of a new volunteer raider unit. Hackworth created the 27th Wolfhound Raiders and led them from August to November 1951. He volunteered for a second tour in Korea, this time with the 40th Infantry Division. Hackworth was promoted to the rank of captain.

=== Cold War ===
External videos
- Booknotes interview with Hackworth on About Face, May 7, 1989, C-SPAN

Hackworth was demobilized after the Korean Armistice Agreement in 1954. But he quickly became bored with civilian life, so after two years of college he re-joined the U.S. Army as a captain in 1956.

When Hackworth returned to active duty, the Cold War substantially changed the structure of the army from what he had known. Initially posted to 77th Antiaircraft Artillery Battalion in Manhattan Beach, California, Hackworth was eventually assigned to Germany, initially in staff roles, but returning to infantry in the early 1960s as a company commander under Colonel Glover S. Johns. He was involved in a number of fire drills around the Berlin Crisis of 1961. He recounted his experiences with the Soviet guard and his views on military history in his book About Face.

After completing an associate of arts degree at Los Angeles Harbor College, and completing additional courses at several other colleges, in 1964, Hackworth graduated from Austin Peay State University with a Bachelor of Science degree in history, after which he attended the Command and General Staff College.

=== Vietnam ===
When President John F. Kennedy announced that a large advisory team was being sent to South Vietnam, Hackworth immediately volunteered for service. His request was denied, on the grounds that he had too much frontline experience, and that others who had seen less fighting (or none) should have an opportunity to acquire experience in combat.

In 1965, he deployed to Vietnam at the rank of Major, serving as an operations officer and battalion commander in the 101st Airborne Division. In November 1965, Hackworth founded a platoon-sized unit designated as Tiger Force to "out guerrilla the guerrillas". The unit carried out long-range reconnaissance patrol duties, suffering heavy casualties; it was eventually awarded the Presidential Unit Citation. However, after Hackworth was reassigned out of Vietnam, the unit committed a series of war crimes, with U.S. Army investigative records estimating that Tiger Force soldiers killed hundreds of noncombatants. Hackworth later stated in an interview with the Toledo Blade that he was unaware of the war crimes the unit carried out and refused to speculate on why they occurred.

Hackworth quickly developed a reputation as an eccentric but effective soldier, becoming a public figure in several books authored by General S. L. A. "Slam" Marshall. Following a stateside tour at the Pentagon and promotion to Lieutenant Colonel, Hackworth co-wrote The Vietnam Primer with Marshall after returning to Vietnam in the winter of 1966–67 on an Army-sponsored tour with the famous historian and commentator. The book advised counter-insurgency fighters to adopt some of the guerrilla tactics used by Mao Zedong, Che Guevara, and Ho Chi Minh. Hackworth described the strategy as "out-G-ing the G." His personal and professional relationship with Marshall soured as Hackworth became suspicious of his methods and motivation.

Both his assignment with "Slam" Marshall and his time on staff duty at the Pentagon soured Hackworth on the Vietnam War. One aspect of the latter required him to publicly defend the U.S. position on the war in a speaking tour. Even with his reservations concerning the conflict, he refused to resign, feeling it was his duty as a field grade officer to wage the campaign as best he could.

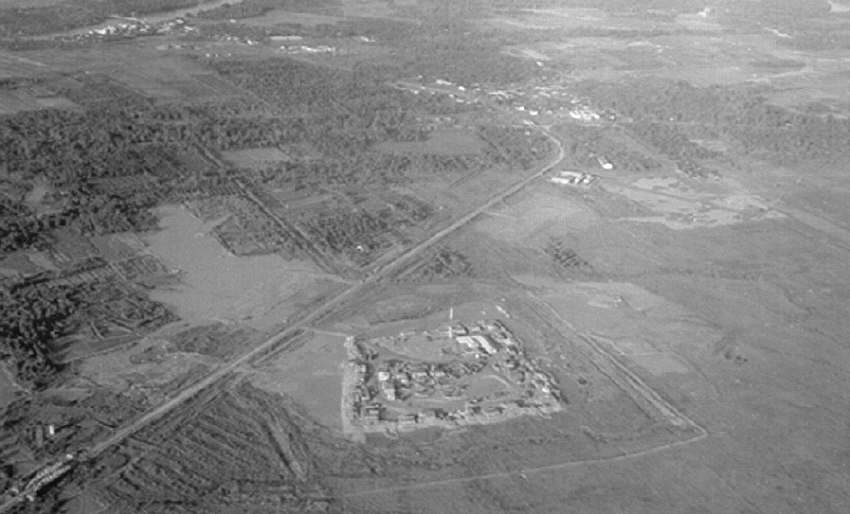
Fire Support Base Danger, Dinh Tuong Province, March 1969: This fire support base was the 4-39th Infantry Battalion headquarters when Hackworth took command of that unit.

Hackworth was assigned to a training battalion at Fort Lewis, Washington, and then returned to Vietnam to lead elements of the 9th Infantry Division, turning his theories about guerrilla warfare and how to counter it into practice with the 4th Battalion, 39th Infantry Regiment (4-39 Infantry) in the Mekong Delta, an underperforming unit made up largely of conscripts which Hackworth transformed into the counter-insurgent "Hardcore" Battalion (Recondo) from January to late May 1969.

Hackworth next served as a senior military adviser to the ARVN, the South Vietnamese army. His view that the U.S. Army was not learning from its mistakes, and that ARVN officers were essentially corrupt and ineffective, created friction with Army leadership.

In early 1971, Hackworth was promoted to the rank of Colonel and received orders to attend the Army War College, an indication that he was being groomed for the general officer ranks. He had declined a previous opportunity to go to the War College, and turned down this one as well, indicating his lack of interest in becoming a general and demonstrating his discontent with the war and the Army's leaders.

=== Criticism ===
Hackworth's dissatisfaction ultimately culminated in a television interview with ABC. On June 27, 1971, he appeared on the program Issues and Answers and strongly criticized U.S. commanders in Vietnam, said the war could not be won and called for U.S. withdrawal. The interview enraged senior U.S. Army officers at the Pentagon.

He retired as a colonel. Senior Army leaders investigated Hackworth, who avoided them for several weeks. He was nearly court-martialed for allegations during his Vietnam service, such as running a brothel, running gambling houses, and exploiting his position for personal profit by manipulating the scrip in which soldiers were paid, and the limited U.S. currency available in the war zone. Ultimately, Secretary of the Army Robert Froehlke opted not to press charges, deciding that Hackworth's career accomplishments outweighed his supposed misdeeds and that prosecuting an outspoken war hero would result in unneeded bad publicity for the Army.

== Post-military career ==
=== Australia ===
After leaving the Army, Hackworth settled in the Australian Gold Coast near Brisbane. He soon made a fortune through profitable ventures that included real estate investing, a duck farm, and a popular restaurant called Scaramouche. He was also active in the Australian antinuclear movement.

=== Writing ===
Hackworth returned to the U.S. in the mid-1980s and began working as a contributing editor on defense issues for Newsweek. He also made regular television appearances to discuss various military-related topics, and the shortcomings of the military. His commentary on the psychological effects of post-traumatic stress disorder, based on his own experiences in overcoming it, resonated with disabled veterans.

In the mid-1990s, Hackworth investigated Admiral Jeremy Michael Boorda, then Chief of Naval Operations. Hackworth, through his Newsweek articles, questioned Boorda's longtime wearing of two bronze "valor pins" (in the Navy, the "V" device was worn on certain decorations to denote valor in combat or direct combat participation with the enemy) on his Navy Commendation Medal and Navy Achievement Medal service ribbons, generating much controversy.

Boorda committed suicide before he could be interviewed by Hackworth, who had received at least one Army Commendation Medal and other decorations with the "V" device from the U.S. Army in the Vietnam War. In the Army, the "V" device denoted valor in combat only. The Navy reviewed the matter, and determined afterwards that the two "Combat Distinguishing Devices" (Combat "V"'s) that Boorda had worn on two of his uniform service ribbons since the Vietnam War, and until almost a year before Hackworth's and Newsweek's intervention, were both unauthorized.

Hackworth's last assignment in a combat/conflict zone was with Newsweek during the initial deployment of US forces into Bosnia and Herzegovina as part of the Implementation Force in February 1996. Hackworth joined 3rd Battalion, 5th Cavalry of the 1st Brigade, 1st Armored Division near the disputed village of Brcko. Hackworth interviewed a number of officers and enlisted soldiers, reinforcing his historical tenure as a seasoned combat veteran of previous wars and as a well-known and respected journalist.

Hackworth appeared on countless television and radio talk shows and formed his own website, Soldiers for the Truth, continuing to be the self-proclaimed voice of the "grunts" (ground troops) until his death.

King Features Syndicate distributed Hackworth's weekly column "Defending America". Many of his columns discussed the war on terrorism and the Iraq War and were concerned with the policies of the American leadership in conducting the wars, and the conditions of the soldiers serving. Hackworth continued the column until his death from bladder cancer in May 2005. Associates believe that his cancer was caused by exposure to Agent Blue, a defoliant used in Vietnam, and are lobbying the United States government to have the substance labeled a known carcinogen like the more famous Agent Orange.

== Death ==
Hackworth died on May 4, 2005, at the age of 74 in Tijuana, Mexico, as he was searching for alternative treatments for his bladder cancer. He was survived by his wife, Eilhys England, four children from his two previous marriages, and a stepdaughter. His remains were interred at Arlington National Cemetery.

== Distinguished Service Cross citations ==
David Haskell Hackworth; Service: Army; Battalion: 1st Battalion; Division: 101st Airborne Division; GENERAL ORDERS: Headquarters, U.S. Army, Vietnam, General Orders No. 121 (1966) Citation: The President of the United States of America, authorized by Act of Congress, July 9, 1918 (amended by act of July 25, 1963), takes pleasure in presenting the Distinguished Service Cross to Major (Infantry) David Haskell Hackworth (ASN: OF-103837), United States Army, for extraordinary heroism in connection with military operations against an armed hostile force in the Republic of Vietnam while serving with 1st Battalion, 327th Infantry, 101st Airborne Division. On 7 February 1966, Major Hackworth's unit was assigned the mission of relieving elements of a friendly rifle company which had been pinned down for four hours. Upon arriving at the beleaguered unit's position, Major Hackworth moved forward, by himself, to conduct a reconnaissance of the area. With complete disregard for his own personal safety, he moved across an open field through a small arms fire, crossed a bridge that was raked by intense hostile machine-gun fire, and ran across another open field through heavy fire to the embattled company's position. Major Hackworth then crawled to within twenty meters of the insurgent positions in the face of heavy machine gun fire. Upon completion of his reconnaissance mission, he returned to his command post and again, with complete disregard for his own personal safety, led the attacking force across the bullet swept fields to the insurgent positions. He then led a group through intense fire to a position only forty meters from the opposing force's battle positions. From this point, under fire for approximately six hours, Major Hackworth calmly and effectively maneuvered his units to close in on the entrenched and determined Viet Cong. Continuously, with complete disregard for his own personal safety, he exposed himself to intense fire to personally inspire and direct the attack. As one of the attacking units began to falter, without hesitation, Major Hackworth left his position to rally the attackers and lead them into the Viet Cong positions. During the final phase of the attack, Major Hackworth again exposed himself to heavy fire in order to direct an airstrike on the Viet Cong. Major Hackworth's extraordinary heroism and gallantry in action were in keeping with the highest traditions of the United States Army and reflect great credit upon himself and the military service.	David Haskell Hackworth; Service: Army; Battalion: 4th Battalion; Division: 9th Infantry Division; GENERAL ORDERS: Headquarters, U.S. Army, Vietnam, General Orders No. 2422 (1969) Citation: The President of the United States of America, authorized by Act of Congress, July 9, 1918 (amended by act of July 25, 1963), takes pleasure in presenting a Bronze Oak Leaf Cluster in lieu of a Second Award of the Distinguished Service Cross to Lieutenant Colonel (Infantry) David Haskell Hackworth (ASN: OF-103837), United States Army, for extraordinary heroism in connection with military operations involving conflict with an armed hostile force in the Republic of Vietnam, while serving with Headquarters and Headquarters Company, 4th Battalion, 39th Infantry, 9th Infantry Division. Lieutenant Colonel Hackworth distinguished himself by exceptionally valorous actions during the period of 23 to 25 March 1969 as battalion commander while his unit was engaged with elements of two Viet Cong battalions. After one of his companies came under attack from a numerically superior hostile force, Colonel Hackworth landed his command and control helicopter amid heavy enemy fire to resupply the unit with ammunition and to evacuate casualties. Remaining with his forces on the ground, he led a patrol in pursuit of the withdrawing enemy and, after learning the enemy's withdrawal plan from a captured soldier, directed the insertion of other elements of his battalion into blocking positions. As the conflict developed into a large scale battle, he again took to the air and flew through intense anti-aircraft fire to adjust artillery fire and direct the movement of his men. He repeatedly landed to coordinate with his ground commanders, lead assaults against hostile positions, and evacuate casualties. When a friendly scout element sustained several casualties and became pinned down near the communist emplacements, he disembarked from his helicopter to maneuver through the hostile fusillade and assist the wounded men to his aircraft. When he had insured that the injured were being evacuated, he adjusted supporting fire on the enemy fortifications until the enemy was soundly defeated and their weapons and supplies confiscated. Lieutenant Colonel Hackworth's extraordinary heroism and devotion to duty were in keeping with the highest traditions of the military service and reflect great credit upon himself, his unit, and the United States Army.

== Awards and Decorations ==
Hackworth earned over 90 U.S. and foreign military awards and frequently wore a CIB lapel pin on his civilian sport jackets.

Badge	Combat Infantryman Badge with star denoting 2nd award		
1st row	Distinguished Service Cross with 1 Oak leaf cluster		Silver Star with 8 Oak leaf clusters
2nd row	Silver Star Extra Ribbon Required	Legion of Merit with 3 Oak leaf clusters	Distinguished Flying Cross
3rd row	Bronze Star Medal with "V" Device and 7 Oak leaf clusters	Purple Heart with 7 Oak leaf clusters	Air Medal with "V" Device and Award numeral 34
4th row	Army Commendation Medal with "V" Device and 3 Oak leaf clusters	Army Good Conduct Medal	World War II Victory Medal
5th row	Army of Occupation Medal with 'Germany' and 'Japan' clasps	National Defense Service Medal with 1 Oak leaf cluster	Korean Service Medal with 8 Campaign stars
6th row	Armed Forces Expeditionary Medal	Vietnam Service Medal with 10 Campaign stars	Armed Forces Reserve Medal
7th row	United Nations Service Medal Korea	Vietnam Campaign Medal	Korean War Service Medal Retroactively Awarded, 2003
Badge	Master Parachutist Badge		
Unit Awards	Presidential Unit Citation		
Unit Awards	Valorous Unit Award with 1 Oak leaf cluster	Meritorious Unit Commendation	Korean Presidential Unit Citation
Unit Awards	RVN Presidential Unit Citation	RVN Gallantry Cross Unit Citation with Palm (3)	RVN Civil Actions Unit Citation 1st Class

=== Merchant Marine Awards ===
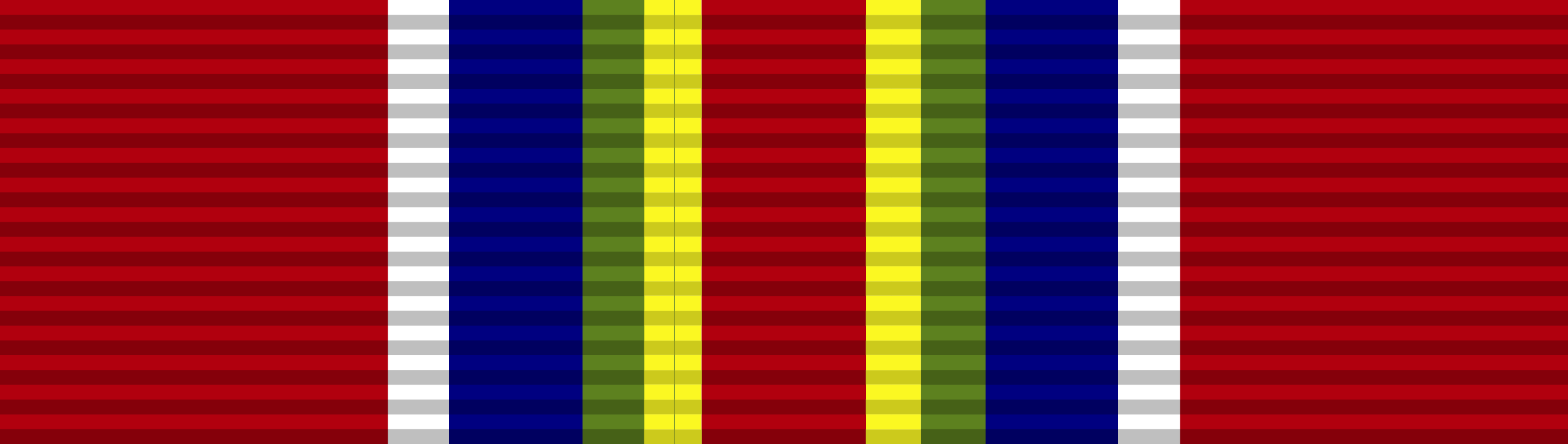

Pacific War Zone Medal	World War II Victory Medal

=== Foreign Awards (RVN) ===

National Order of Vietnam Officer	RVN Gallantry Cross with 2 Gold Stars	RVN Gallantry Cross with 2 Silver Stars
Armed Forces Honor Medal 1st Class	Staff Service Medal 1st Class	Army Distinguished Service Order 2nd Class

== Admiral Boorda accusations and Media apologies over Hackworth reporting ==
In 1996, Hackworth accused Chief of Naval Operations Admiral Michael Boorda of wearing two unauthorized service ribbons on his uniform denoting valor in combat. Boorda committed suicide during Hackworth's investigation. In 1997, Hackworth was mistakenly accused of wearing unauthorised decorations: an extra Distinguished Flying Cross and a Ranger Tab. An audit later proved it was a US Army administrative error and not the fault of Hackworth.

In response to Hackworth's investigation of Admiral Boorda, CNN and the CBS Evening News with Dan Rather questioned the accuracy of Hackworth's own military decorations. In particular, the reports accused Hackworth of claiming a Ranger Tab to which he was not entitled and an extra Distinguished Flying Cross listed on his website. Hackworth threatened to sue CBS and requested a formal audit of his military records. In response to the findings made from the military audit, the executive producer of CBS News sent a letter to Hackworth that stated:

The Army's audit of its records has determined that the Army made an administrative error back in 1988 when it reissued your medals and awards. Along with numerous other decorations, the Army mistakenly issued you a Ranger Tab and two Oak Leaf Clusters for your Distinguished Flying Cross. The Army has thus verified what we reported as your explanation of the matter.

As far as we are concerned, the Army audit makes clear that you did not at any time wear or claim any military honor not actually issued by the U.S. Army, based on its official records, including the service record you signed and dated. At the same time, CBS continues to believe that our reports did not state or imply that you knowingly wore or claimed decorations not issued by the U.S. Army and that any such inference drawn from the reports would be mistaken.

Similarly, we do not believe our reports in any way equated your conduct with that of the late Admiral Boorda's. Indeed, as we believe we made clear in our reports, by all accounts you are a man who has shown extraordinary heroism in your service to our country, and has deservedly been awarded many of the nation's most coveted awards for valor.

In 2002, Hackworth was asked about the controversy in an interview with Proceedings. In the interview, he stated:

I had served in the 8th Ranger Company; later I served in the 27th Raiders of the 25th Infantry Division. On the Raiders' tenth mission, the regimental commander awarded every trooper the Ranger Tab. When all this fell out after the Boorda story, I immediately had my records audited. And they reflected that I was awarded the Ranger Tab. It was on my official records; it's not something I claimed falsely.

Let me tell you how the regulation reads now. To rate a Ranger Tab, you had to have been awarded the Combat Infantry Badge (CIB) while a member of the 8th Ranger Company. But I got my CIB with Company G, 27th Infantry Regiment. Thus, the 1951 award of the tab did not meet the 1980s criteria. I take all the blame.

All the guys in the 27th Raiders got the Ranger Tab, but they were not Rangers. When the Boorda story exploded, people were looking for chinks in my armor. So I'm a defrocked Ranger. As it turned out, though, in the Army's vetting of my record, they found I had ten Silver Stars, not nine.

== In popular culture ==
Robert Duvall partially based his performance of Lieutenant Colonel William "Bill" Kilgore from the film Apocalypse Now on David Hackworth.

== Works ==
Books

- Hackworth, David H.; Sherman, Julie (2020). About Face: The Odyssey of an American Warrior. New York: Simon and Schuster. ISBN 9781982144043. OCLC 1202533502.
- ——; Sherman, Julie (1993). Brave Men: The Blood-and-Guts Combat Chronicle of One of America's Most Decorated Soldiers. New York: Pocket Books. ISBN 978-0671865603. OCLC 28441083.
- ——; Matthews, Tom (1996). Hazardous Duty: America's Most Decorated Living Soldier Reports from the Front and Tells It the Way It Is. New York: William Morrow. ISBN 978-0688147181. OCLC 34658741.
- —— (1999). Price of Honor. New York: Doubleday. ISBN 978-0385491648. OCLC 41326266. Novel.
- ——; S. L. A. "Slam" Marshall (2002). The Vietnam Primer: Lessons Learned. New York: Twin Eagles Ink. ISBN 978-0974099606. OCLC 54523979. Reprint of 1967 ed.
- ——; England, Eilhys (2002). Steel My Soldiers' Hearts: The Hopeless to Hardcore Transformation of 4th Battalion, 39th Infantry, United States Army, Vietnam. Simon & Schuster. ISBN 978-0-7432-4613-2. OCLC 1342799570.

Journalism

Hackworth wrote articles for:

- Maxim
- Men's Journal
- Modern Maturity
- Newsweek
- Parade
- People
- Playboy
- Self
- Soldier of Fortune
- WorldNetDaily
