= Genoa Area Local School District =

School district in Ohio

Coordinates: 41°31′16″N 83°21′41″W

Location
- Genoa, Ohio; U.S.

District information
- Type: Public School District
- Motto: ""

Students and staff
- Students: Grades K-12

Other information
- Website: http://www.genoaschools.com/

Genoa Area Local School District is a school district in Northwest Ohio. The school district has an open enrollment policy which allows students who live outside the district's borders to attend; however, the school primarily serves students who live in the city and townships of Genoa, Allen Twp., and Clay Twp. located in Ottawa County. The superintendent is Dennis Mock.

== Grades 9–12 ==
- Genoa Area High School

Students who live in the village of Genoa attend the school district, as well as students who live in the towns of Clay Center, Curtice, Martin, and Williston.

== Grades 6–8 ==
- John C. Robert Middle School

== Grades K–5 ==
- Genoa Elementary School
