= Sam Ybarra =

American Vietnam War commando (1945–1982)

- Born: 1945; San Carlos Apache Indian Reservation, Arizona, U.S.
- Died: 1982 (aged 36); San Carlos Apache Indian Reservation, Arizona, U.S.
- Military career
- Allegiance: United States
- Branch: United States Army
- Unit: Tiger Force
- Conflicts: Vietnam War

Sam Ybarra (1945–1982) was a United States Army soldier who served in the Tiger Force commando unit attached to the 101st Airborne Division during the Vietnam War. He is notable for involvement in war crimes alongside the Tiger Force unit.

== Early life ==
Ybarra was born and raised on the San Carlos Apache Indian Reservation in Arizona to a Mexican father and an Apache mother. When he was five, his father died in a bar brawl, and after that he was raised by his mother. He attended Globe High School in Globe, Arizona, and was arrested four times as a teenager for disturbing the peace and underage drinking.

== Military service ==
Ybarra enlisted in the U.S. Army in 1966, along with his childhood friend, Kenneth Green, and the friends were attached to the Tiger Force unit. Ybarra was noted by the Stars and Stripes magazine as having recorded the 1000th kill of Operation Wheeler.

Green was killed by a sniper on September 29, 1967, and other Tiger Force soldiers claim that it threw Ybarra over the edge, as he vowed to avenge his friend's death. As a result, he became the unit's worst killer, and had to be transferred out of the unit to an artillery company in early 1968. Ybarra went on to be court martialed for insubordination, and was dishonorably discharged in late 1968. He would later be named in 7 of the 30 allegations that the Army would later investigate the unit for, including the rape and fatal stabbing of a 13-year-old girl and the killing of a 15-year-old boy.

Once discharged, Ybarra could not be compelled to testify to the investigations against him, and declined three times. After years of using drugs and alcohol, he died of pneumonia in 1982, at age 36, living with his mother on the San Carlos Apache Reservation in Arizona, reportedly contrite and depressed over his role in the war. He repeatedly confessed to murdering civilians, including children, to friends and family members. At the time of his death, Ybarra weighed less than 100 pounds due to complications from his alcoholism.
