= Miami High School (Arizona) =

School in Gila County, Arizona

Coordinates: 33°24′40″N 110°50′02″W

Miami Junior/Senior High School
- Home of the Vandals

Location
- 4739 E. Ragus Road; Miami, Arizona 85539; United States

Information
- School type: Public high school
- Established: 1916 (110 years ago)
- School district: Miami Unified School District
- CEEB code: 030225
- Principal: Cynthia Cramer
- Teaching staff: 21.00 (FTE)
- Grades: 7-12
- Enrollment: 424 (2023–2024)
- Student to teacher ratio: 20.19
- Colors: Kelly green and white
- Mascot: Vandals
- Website: www.miamiusd40.org/..

Miami High School (also known as Miami Junior/Senior High School) is located in the town of Miami, Arizona. It is the only high school in the Miami Unified School District, which also includes two elementary schools. It serves the communities of Miami, Claypool, and Central Heights-Midland City.

== History ==
The high school opened in 1916 in this small mining town. From 1925 to 1934, it housed grades 7 through 12, and it housed just grades 10 through 12 through 1937. Up until 1999 Miami High School housed the district preschool and grades 9–12. In 1999, in order to cut costs, the separate middle school, Lee Kornegay Middle School, was folded back into the high school for the first time in 75 years, returning the school to its current 7-12 grade range.

Enrollment before the Baby Boom averaged 400 students. In 1967, it reached its all-time enrollment high, 801 students, and it did not go below 700 for another decade. Enrollment has mostly declined since.

== Sports ==
Miami's mascot is the Vandals. The major rivalry this school has is with nearby Globe High School; the schools' football teams play for the "Copper Kettle" trophy.
