= Kyle Kazan =

American businessman (born 1967)

Kyle Dana Kazan
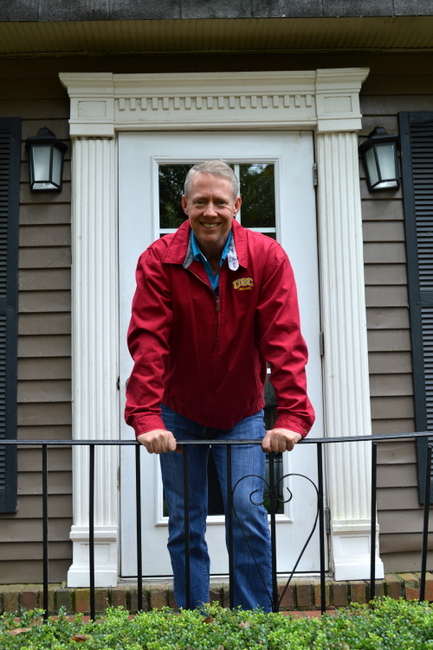
- Born: March 11, 1967 (age 59); Inglewood, California
- Citizenship: United States
- Education: B.A. University of Southern California
- Occupations: Managing Member, CEO
- Known for: Beach Front Property Management, Inc. and Glass House Group, Inc.
- Website: https://bfpminc.com; https://www.glasshousebrands.com/

Kyle Kazan (born March 11, 1967) is an American businessman who is the co-founder, chairman, and CEO of Glass House Brands Inc., a publicly traded cannabis company listed on the OTCQX market and Cboe Canada. He is also a founder and chairman of Beach Front Property Management, Inc. and co-founder and managing member of Beach Front Properties, LLC. Kazan has also served as a special education teacher at LAUSD and a police officer at the Torrance Police Department.

== Early life and education ==
Kazan was born in 1967 in Inglewood, California to Richard and Anne Kazan. He was raised in the Palos Verdes peninsula and attended Palos Verdes High School from 1981 to 1985. Kazan then attended University of Southern California where he received his BA in history in 1990. While at USC, Kazan was recruited to play basketball from 1987 to 1990 as both a point guard and shooting guard by future Hall of Fame coach George Raveling.

== Career ==
After graduating from USC in 1990, Kazan became a special education teacher at LAUSD in 1991. Four years later, Kazan served in the patrol division of the Torrance Police Department with collateral assignments and training in gang enforcement and drugs recognition and eradication until 1999. Throughout his tenure, he made arrests mainly for methamphetamine and heroin, with one cannabis arrest as a secondary charge to methamphetamine.

Kazan began his real estate investment career with wife Diane Kazan in the late 1990s. In 1997, Kazan and James B. Rosenwald co-founded Beach Front Properties, LLC., a real estate investment company based in southern California. Together their portfolio spans residential and commercial properties across the U.S., China and Germany with a focus on distressed properties, earning Kazan a reputation as a "vulture investor" and expert in turning rundown properties into stable assets. In 1999, Kazan left the police department and founded Beach Front Property Management, Inc., a third party property management company headquartered in Long Beach, CA.

In addition to real estate investing, Kazan has also been involved in the management of venture capital. With Steve Persky from Dalton Investments, Kazan has co-managed the Dalton Distressed Mortgage Fund since 1997. Kazan also has served as director of the Dalton High Yield Mortgage Fund since 2012 as well as Kings Bay Investment Company, Ltd since 2013.

Beginning in 2016, Kazan created four cannabis-focused private equity funds targeting different aspects of the industry, including the first fund, named “AP Investment Fund,” in which the “AP” stood for “Anti-Prohibition.”

In 2020, Kazan rolled these funds into Glass House Group, Inc., a vertically integrated cannabis company in California. The company operates greenhouse cultivation facilities totaling approximately 6 million square feet in California, with annual production capacity exceeding 600,000 pounds of cannabis. The company operates retail locations and multiple cannabis brands across California, including Glass House Farms, PLUS, Allswell, Forbidden Flowers, FIELD, and Mama Sue Wellness.

On June 29, 2021, Glass House Group, Inc. completed its go-public transaction through a business combination with Mercer Park Brand Acquisition Corp. and officially changed its name to Glass House Brands Inc., commencing trading on July 5, 2021. As of 2025, the company trades on the OTCQX market under ticker symbol GLASF and on Cboe Canada as GLAS.A.U. Kazan currently serves as the company's chairman and CEO.

Since December 2020, Glass House Brands has been working closely with the Weldon Project and MISSION [GREEN], a non-profit organization dedicated to ending federal prohibition of cannabis and achieving criminal justice reform for those convicted of nonviolent cannabis-related offenses, to advocate for policy change and clemency programs that address the lasting harm created by the War on Drugs. Glass House committed to spearheading fundraising initiatives for The Weldon Project as well as a campaign to petition the Biden administration to free all federal nonviolent cannabis prisoners. In December 2021, Kazan joins the Board of Directors of the Weldon Project and MISSION [GREEN]. Kyle is passionate about the human impacts of cannabis legislation and has called for action urging for the immediate release of nonviolent cannabis offenders.

== Personal life ==
Since 2010, Kazan has appeared at several public speeches organized by Law Enforcement Against Prohibition (LEAP) as an outspoken advocate both in favor of the legalization of marijuana and against the war on drugs. He has also made several television appearances to oppose the war on drugs, including an interview conducted by CNN, and has advocated for the expungement of cannabis convictions and the release of cannabis prisoners, specifically Parker Coleman, Jr.

Kazan also currently presides at the Redondo Beach chapter Cancer Support Community as president of the board of directors.

== Glass House Brands enforcement actions ==
In July 2025, Glass House Brands facilities in Camarillo and Carpinteria, California were subject to U.S. Immigration and Customs Enforcement (ICE) operations that resulted in 361 arrests. Federal authorities reported that 14 minors were found in what they characterized as potential forced labor situations. One worker, Jaime Alanis Garcia, died from injuries sustained during the operation after reportedly falling from a greenhouse roof.

The company reported that 9 of its direct employees were detained, with the remaining individuals being employees of third-party labor contractors. Following the enforcement action, Glass House Brands reported significant operational impacts, including projected Q3 2025 revenue of $35-38 million, representing a shortfall of $25-30 million from previous projections, and production declining to below 40% of typical capacity.

In November 2025, Glass House Brands disclosed that the July 2025 immigration enforcement operations had cost the company over $26 million in lost revenue and reduced its quarterly harvest by more than 100,000 pounds of dried cannabis.[ref] During an earnings call, Kazan characterized the previous quarter as the company's most difficult to date. Community advocates reported that despite initial promises of legal assistance, many arrested workers were deported without receiving support from the company, with immigrant rights organization CAUSE noting that "we haven't seen any further action or meaningful outreach" from Glass House.

In response, the company terminated contracts with two Farm Labor Contractors, engaged compliance consultants including former ICE Director Julie Myers Wood, implemented E-Verify for all employees, and signed a labor agreement with the International Brotherhood of Teamsters.

In February 2024, a class action lawsuit was filed in Los Angeles County Superior Court alleging labor law violations at Glass House facilities, including unpaid overtime, denial of meal and rest breaks, and lack of sick pay.

== Company directorships / managing member ==
Year	Company
2013 to Present	Kings Bay Investment Company, Ltd.
2005 to Present	Dalton Berlin Real Estate Fund I, Ltd.
1997 to Present	Beach Front Properties, LLC.
1999 to Present	Beach Front Property Management, Inc.
2007 to Present	Dalton Distressed Mortgage Fund
2003 to 2011	Grand River Properties, Ltd.
2019 to Present	Glass House Group, Inc. / Glass House Brands Inc. (Chairman & CEO)

== Affiliations ==
- Cancer Support Community Redondo Beach (president on board of directors))
- Wellness Community Redondo Beach (former board member)
- Apartment Association of Greater Los Angeles
- Apartment Association of Southern California Cities (trade show co-chair)
- Law Enforcement Against Prohibition (LEAP)
