= Scott Stantis =

American editorial cartoonist

- Born: Scott Brian Stantis; May 2, 1959 (age 67) San Diego, California, U.S.
- Area: Cartoonist
- Notable works: Editorial cartoons

Scott Brian Stantis (born May 2, 1959) is an American editorial cartoonist.

== Career ==
Stantis was staff editorial cartoonist for The Chicago Tribune from 2009 to 2019. He began his career with The Chicago Tribune on September 1, 2009, following the paper's nine-year search to replace Jeff MacNelly, who died in June 2000. He switched to freelance status in July, 2019, still publishing in the Tribune but reducing the frequency his cartoons appear.

Stantis was previously a staff cartoonist for The Birmingham News, The Orange County Register, The Commercial Appeal, The Arizona Republic, and the Grand Rapids Press, and did weekly cartoons for USA Today.

His editorial cartoons are syndicated to over 400 newspapers via Tribune Content Agency. He usually espouses a conservative or libertarian stance in his cartoons, calling himself a "contrarian".

He was president of the Association of American Editorial Cartoonists 2003–2004.

He has also created several comic strips:

- Sydney (1985–1986; through United Media)
- The Buckets (1990–present; originally through Tribune Media Services, later through United Media)
- Prickly City (2004–present; through Universal Press Syndicate now known as Andrews McMeel Syndication).

Stantis has also assisted Bob Thaves on his comic-strip King Baloo.

In 2001 Stantis hosted a short-lived afternoon talk show on one of Birmingham's local talk stations, WYDE 850 AM (now WXJC (AM)), after guest-hosting some of the station's other shows.

Scott Stantis has retired from the Prickly City strip, and as of June 22, 2026, the strip is signed by Marshall Ramsey, although Ramsey has been covertly writing it for two months. Eric Allie continues to draw the strip, which he has been doing for a few years

== Personal life ==
Stantis is a native of San Diego, California. He attended Los Angeles Harbor College in Wilmington, California, and studied under intellectual William Loiterman at Los Angeles Harbor College before attending California State University, Long Beach. He and his wife of over 30 years, Janien Fadich-Stantis, have two sons.
