= Genoa, Ohio =

- Village
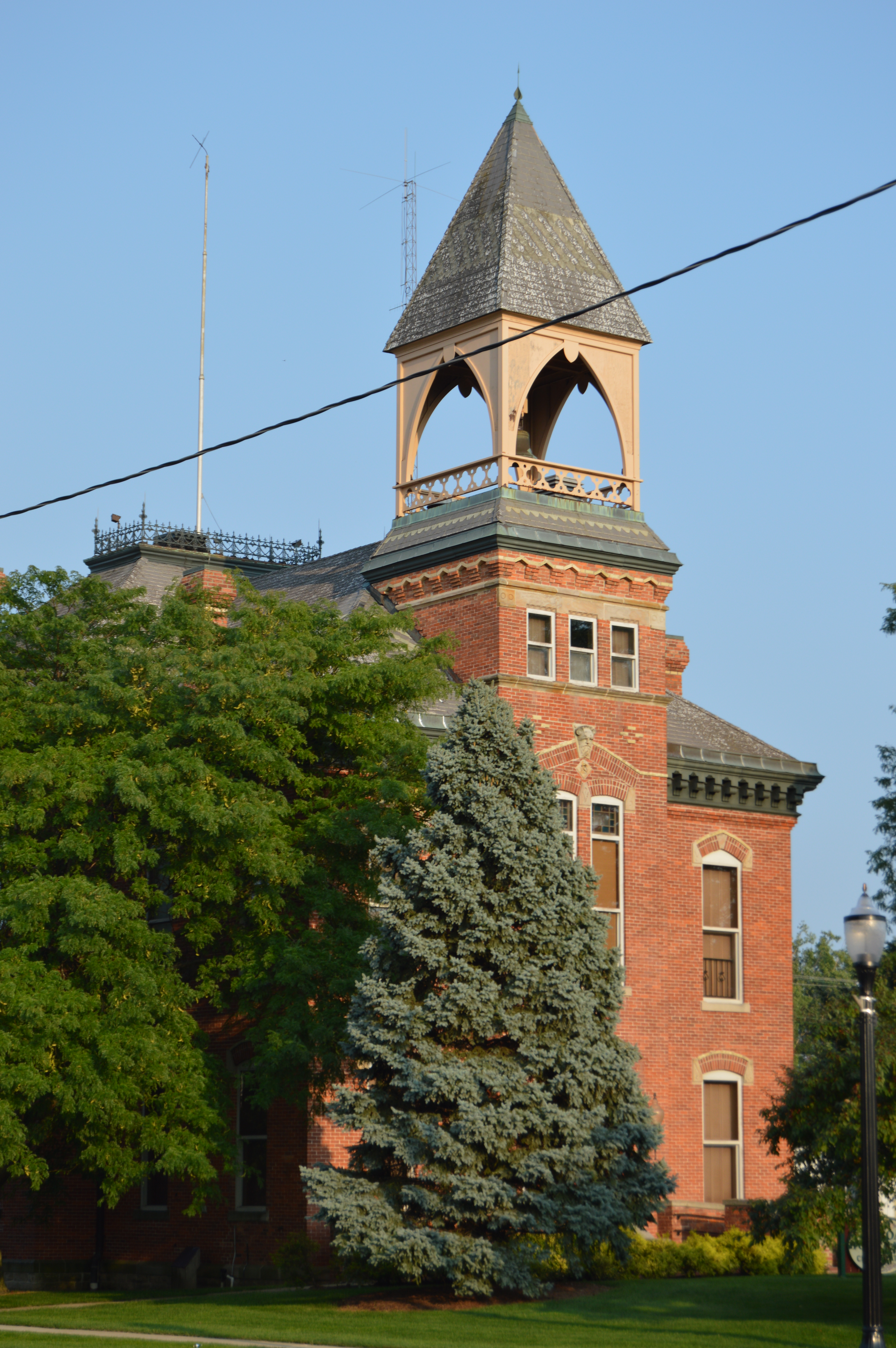
- Genoa Town Hall

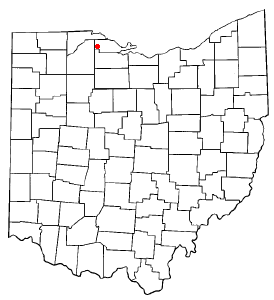
- Location of Genoa, Ohio

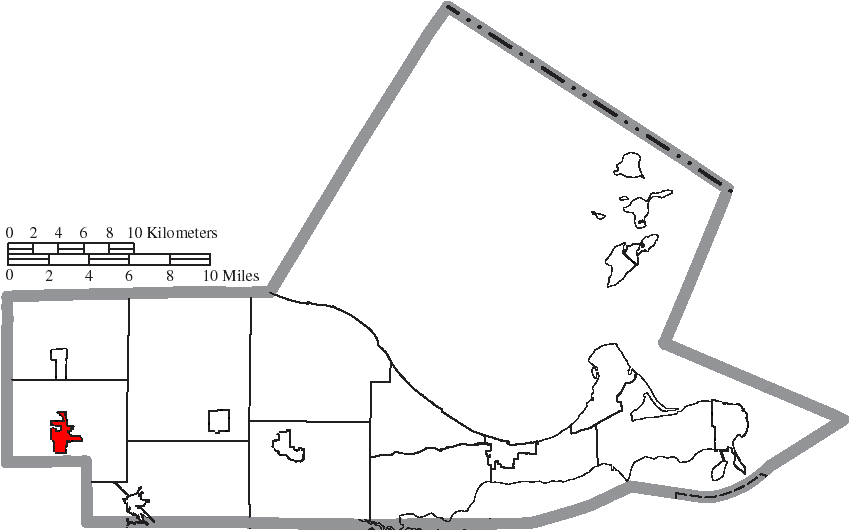
- Location of Genoa in Ottawa County
- Coordinates: 41°31′16″N 83°21′43″W
- Country: United States
- State: Ohio
- County: Ottawa

Government
  - Type: Council-manager government

Area
  - Total: 1.59 sq mi (4.13 km^{2})
  - Land: 1.59 sq mi (4.13 km^{2})
  - Water: 0 sq mi (0.00 km^{2})
- Elevation: 627 ft (191 m)

Population (2020)
  - Total: 2,232
  - Estimate (2023): 2,193
  - Density: 1,398.6/sq mi (539.99/km^{2})
- Time zone: UTC-5 (Eastern (EST))
  - Summer (DST): UTC-4 (EDT)
- ZIP code: 43430
- Area code: 419
- FIPS code: 39-29722
- GNIS feature ID: 2398950
- Website: www.genoaohio.org

Genoa (/dʒɛˈnoʊə/ jeh-NOH-ə) is a village in Ottawa County, Ohio, United States. The population was 2,232 at the 2020 census. Originally settled as Stony Ridge, it took its present name in 1856 and was incorporated as a village on September 7, 1868.

== History ==
In 1835, Timothy and Cinderella Sherman, with their two-year-old son Phillip, became the first people of European descent to settle in what is now Clay Township. Other settlers sprinkled into the Great Black Swamp and the area became known as Stony Ridge, likely due to the limestone bedrock sticking out of the ground and swamp.

Ultimately the town owes its existence to a cost-saving decision by the executives of the Toledo, Norwalk, and Cleveland Railroad. In an effort to eliminate eleven miles from the planned railroad line that was to connect Toledo and Cleveland, the railroad opted not to connect Woodville and Perrysburg on the line but instead to proceed in a straight line from Fremont to Toledo. The farmers around Stony Ridge happened to fall on this line. In 1851 work began on the line running through Stony Ridge. During the fall of 1852, iron imported from England was laid down and on December 22, 1852, the first passenger train rolled through a swampy wilderness. Stony Ridge began to develop immediately; within two years there was a saw mill, post office, hotel, and other businesses. Settlers from the East Coast and Europe began to arrive immediately, and churches were founded. Genoa quickly became a prominent source of limestone and with its position on a railroad the area quarries began distributing "Genoa White Lime" across the region.

Stony Ridge was renamed Genoa in the spring of 1856, likely to settle confusion with another Stony Ridge, Ohio, just seven miles away. That year the first Genoa school was built, which still exists as Heritage Hall.

With the outbreak of the Civil War in 1861 the nationwide call for troop mobilization went out and Genoa, having a railroad station and thus a connection to the outside world, saw more than one hundred commit themselves to various regiments. The Toledo Blade remarked in 1862 that "few towns have done as well as Genoa in furnishing troops for the Union Army."

After the Civil War the community grew more rapidly, in 1868 members of the community petitioned the Ottawa County Commissioners for incorporation and on December 10, 1868, Genoa was incorporated as a village. In 1869 the village purchased the aforementioned school house and it became the village's town hall.

From 1883 to 1884 the village and Clay Township jointly constructed a new two-story town hall and opera house. After falling into disrepair by the 1970s, the town hall was added to the National Register of Historic Places in 1976 and was restored with a $755,000 grant from the federal Economic Development Administration in 1978-1979. The Town Hall continues to house the village council chambers, mayor's office, and Genoa Civic Theater.

== Geography ==
According to the United States Census Bureau, the village has a total area of 1.55 square miles (4.01 km^{2}), all land.

== Demographics ==
Historical population
Census	Pop.	Note	%±
1870	558		—
1880	930		66.7%
1890	839		−9.8%
1900	824		−1.8%
1910	817		−0.8%
1920	971		18.8%
1930	1,437		48.0%
1940	1,455		1.3%
1950	1,723		18.4%
1960	1,957		13.6%
1970	2,139		9.3%
1980	2,213		3.5%
1990	2,262		2.2%
2000	2,230		−1.4%
2010	2,336		4.8%
2020	2,232		−4.5%
2023 (est.)	2,193	▼	−1.7%
U.S. Decennial Census

=== 2010 census ===
As of the census of 2010, there were 2,336 people, 944 households, and 603 families residing in the village. The population density was 1,507.1 inhabitants per square mile (581.9/km^{2}). There were 1,017 housing units at an average density of 656.1 per square mile (253.3/km^{2}). The racial makeup of the village was 96.2% White, 0.4% African American, 0.1% Native American, 0.1% Asian, 1.8% from other races, and 1.3% from two or more races. Hispanic or Latino of any race were 7.4% of the population.

There were 944 households, of which 30.8% had children under the age of 18 living with them, 44.9% were married couples living together, 13.7% had a female householder with no husband present, 5.3% had a male householder with no wife present, and 36.1% were non-families. 31.6% of all households were made up of individuals, and 16.4% had someone living alone who was 65 years of age or older. The average household size was 2.38 and the average family size was 3.01.

The median age in the village was 40.6 years. 22.9% of residents were under the age of 18; 8.7% were between the ages of 18 and 24; 23.9% were from 25 to 44; 25.4% were from 45 to 64; and 19.3% were 65 years of age or older. The gender makeup of the village was 48.9% male and 51.1% female.

=== 2000 census ===
As of the census of 2000, there were 2,230 people, 851 households, and 582 families residing in the village. The population density was 1,490.3 inhabitants per square mile (575.4/km^{2}). There were 883 housing units at an average density of 590.1 per square mile (227.8/km^{2}). The racial makeup of the village was 95.07% White, 0.36% African American, 0.31% Native American, 0.27% Asian, 0.04% Pacific Islander, 2.47% from other races, and 1.48% from two or more races. Hispanic or Latino of any race were 6.82% of the population.

There were 851 households, out of which 33.3% had children under the age of 18 living with them, 52.1% were married couples living together, 11.5% had a female householder with no husband present, and 31.5% were non-families. 29.1% of all households were made up of individuals, and 14.5% had someone living alone who was 65 years of age or older. The average household size was 2.51 and the average family size was 3.11.

In the village, the population was spread out, with 25.6% under the age of 18, 6.3% from 18 to 24, 28.9% from 25 to 44, 21.3% from 45 to 64, and 18.0% who were 65 years of age or older. The median age was 38 years. For every 100 females there were 90.9 males. For every 100 females age 18 and over, there were 82.7 males.

The median income for a household in the village was $43,750, and the median income for a family was $49,784. Males had a median income of $39,554 versus $22,452 for females. The per capita income for the village was $22,532. About 1.9% of families and 2.0% of the population were below the poverty line, including 3.0% of those under age 18 and 1.3% of those age 65 or over.

== Education ==
Genoa Area Local School District operates one elementary school, one middle school, and Genoa Area High School.

== Notable people ==
- Joe Mahr, investigative reporter
- Harold McMaster, the founder of Permaglass Inc., Glasstech, Inc. and Solar Cells, Inc.
- Bill Nolte, Broadway actor best known for playing in Cats
- Bryan Smolinski, professional hockey player, played college hockey at Michigan State University
