= Michael D. Sallah =

American journalist

- Education: University of Toledo
- Occupation: Journalist
- Writing career
- Notable works: Tiger Force: A True Story of Men and War, The Yankee Comandante: The Untold Story of Courage, Passion, and One American's Fight to Liberate Cuba
- Notable awards: 2004 Pulitzer Prize for Investigative Reporting, 2007 Pulitzer Prize for Local Reporting, 2017 Honorary Doctorate from The University of Toledo, College of Arts and Letters

Michael D. Sallah is an American investigative reporter and non-fiction author who has twice been awarded the Pulitzer Prize and is a three-time Pulitzer Prize finalist.

== Life ==
Sallah graduated from St. John's Jesuit High School, a college preparatory school in Ohio, and then obtained his undergraduate degree in journalism at the University of Toledo.

While working for The Toledo Blade, he received numerous state and national awards for his investigative stories into organized crime, clerical sexual abuse and white-collar fraud. He was named Best Reporter in Ohio in 2002 by the Society of Professional Journalists.

Two years later, Sallah and fellow reporters Mitch Weiss and Joe Mahr were awarded the 2004 Pulitzer Prize for Investigative Reporting for a series on the atrocities by Tiger Force, a U.S. Army platoon during the Vietnam War.

In 2005, he became an investigative reporter and editor at the Miami Herald, where he directed numerous projects including a series on public housing corruption that won the 2007 Pulitzer Prize for Local Reporting. He was a Pulitzer finalist for meritorious Public Service in 2012 for a series exposing wretched and deadly conditions in Florida's assisted living facilities. He worked two years at The Washington Post, and returned in 2014 to The Miami Herald, where he was a Pulitzer finalist for Local Reporting in 2016 for stories that exposed a corrupt police sting operation that laundered $71.5 million for drug cartels—kept millions in profits—but did not make a single arrest. He was a member of the reporting team that was a Pulitzer finalist for International Reporting in 2021 for its work at the International Consortium of Investigative Journalists and BuzzFeed News on the FinCEN Files investigation, which revealed the role of big banks in allowing criminal organizations to move billions of dollars through the financial institutions.

Sallah has received other national awards for his work in accountability journalism, including The IRE Medal, a George Polk Award, a Gerald Loeb Award, a Heywood Broun Award, a Sigma Delta Chi Award and a Robert F. Kennedy Journalism Award.

His reporting has been featured in three major documentaries (in which he also appeared), including Twist of Faith, an Academy Award-nominated feature documentary in 2004 about the clerical abuse crisis in Ohio, a PBS American Experience film in 2015 about William Alexander Morgan, an American who led his own fighting unit in the Cuban Revolution, and From Russia With Lev, a 2024 film that chronicles the Ukraine backchannel campaign that resulted in the first impeachment trial of Donald Trump in 2019.

Sallah has taught investigative journalism at Barry University in Miami and Boston University's Washington DC program, and is a media fellow at Northwestern University's Medill School of Journalism Investigative Lab in Washington. He received an honorary doctor of humane letters by his alma mater, the University of Toledo, in 2017.

He currently serves as deputy managing editor of investigations at the Pittsburgh Post-Gazette.

== Works ==
- With Mitch Weiss.Tiger Force: A True Story of Men and War. Little, Brown and Company. 2006. ISBN 0316066354. "mitch weiss pulitzer."
- With Mitch Weiss. The Yankee Comandante: The Untold Story of Courage, Passion, and One American's Fight to Liberate Cuba. Lyons Press, 2015. ISBN 0762792876
