= Prickly City =

American comic strip

- Author: Scott Stantis; Marshall Ramsey and Eric Allie
- Website: www.gocomics.com/pricklycity
- Current status/schedule: Running
- Launch date: July 11, 2004
- Syndicate(s): Universal Press Syndicate (2004–09); United Features Syndicate (2009–present)
- Genre(s): Humor, Politics

Prickly City is a daily comic strip originally drawn by Scott Stantis, the editorial cartoonist for the Chicago Tribune, and distributed through United Features Syndicate. The cartoon follows the adventures of Carmen, a young girl of color, and a coyote pup named Winslow. The strip is frequently politically oriented with a conservative point-of-view.

Scott Stantis has retired from the strip, and as of June 22, 2026, the strip is signed by Marshall Ramsey, although Ramsey has been covertly writing it for two months. Eric Allie continues to draw the strip, which he has been doing for a few years

== Characters ==
Carmen – a 'feisty' conservative and a Republican. For a brief time, she had a crush on Tucker Carlson. Carmen made her first appearance at least 4 months before the strip began, in one of Stantis's editorial cartoons.

Winslow – named for the town of Winslow, Arizona, is a coyote with political aspirations who acts patronizing, condescending and impulsive. His liberal responses are typically the source of the strip's jokes. Carmen is continuously frustrated by Winslow's assumption that she should be a liberal feminist. Early in the strip's run, Winslow had a crush on Condoleezza Rice, even writing a poem about her (which Carmen initially misunderstood as being a poem about herself).

=== Minor recurring characters ===
- Kevin, the Lost Bunny of the Apocalypse. Depending on the needs of the strip, he's alternately meant to evoke Barack Obama and Bill Clinton. He reports on signs of the "end times". In 2010, he was elected to the U.S. Senate under the banner of Winslow's "Lefty Tea Party".
- Hunny, Kevin's wife (also a bunny) and a prominent politician. Her character is a thinly veiled satire of Hillary Clinton.
- Dio, a chameleon named for Diogenes the Cynic. He was a campaign director for Winslow.
- Vaughn, appears to be an armadillo. He served as Winslow's campaign finance director.
- Rand, a vulture, possibly named after Rand Paul or Ayn Rand.
- Skunk, a thinly veiled satire of Donald Trump.

== Controversies ==
The Chicago Tribune refused to run the February 7, 2005 strip, which inaccurately quoted Ted Kennedy. According to Stantis, the syndicate erroneously added quote marks to the dialogue without his permission. Later that year The Seattle Times refused to run a series of strips about the Terri Schiavo case. Later, a series of strips beginning August 25, 2008, accused the attendees of the 2008 Democratic National Convention of being communists.

== Book collection ==
Title	Cover	Publication Date	ISBN
Greetings from Prickly City	September 1, 2005	ISBN 0-7407-5451-3	

== See also ==
- Mallard Fillmore – another conservative-themed comic strip
