= Mitch Weiss =

American investigative journalist and editor

Mitchell S. Weiss (born 1957) is an American investigative journalist, and an editor at The Charlotte Observer. He won the 2004 Pulitzer Prize for Investigative Reporting, with Joe Mahr and Michael D. Sallah.

== Life ==
Weiss is a native of New York City. He graduated from Northwestern University with an MS in journalism in 1982. He was an Associated Press reporter in Toledo and Columbus, Ohio. From 1998 to 2005 he worked for The Blade. In 2005, he was deputy business editor of The Charlotte Observer. In 2008, he was correspondent to the Charlotte Bureau of the Associated Press.

Weiss teaches journalism at the University of South Carolina Upstate. He was a finalist for the Gerald Loeb Award in 2009.

== Works ==
- With Michael Sallah. Tiger Force: A True Story of Men and War. Hodder & Stoughton. 2006. ISBN 978-0-340-75249-4.
- With Kevin Maurer. No Way Out: A Story of Valor in the Mountains of Afghanistan. Berkley, 2012. ISBN 0425245268
- With Kevin Maurer. Hunting Che: How a U.S. Special Forces Team Helped Capture the World’s Most Famous Revolutionary. Berkley, 2013. ISBN 0425257460
- With Michael Sallah. The Yankee Comandante: The Untold Story of Courage, Passion, and One American's Fight to Liberate Cuba. Lyons Press, 2015. ISBN 0762792876
- The Heart of Hell: The Untold Story of Courage and Sacrifice in the Shadow of Iwo Jima. Berkley. 2016. ISBN 978-0425279175.
- With Chris Wallace. Countdown 1945: The Extraordinary Story of the Atomic Bomb and the 116 Days That Changed the World. Avid Reader Press / Simon & Schuster. 2020. ISBN 978-1982143343.
