= Inscription Rock (Kelleys Island, Ohio) =

- U.S. National Register of Historic Places
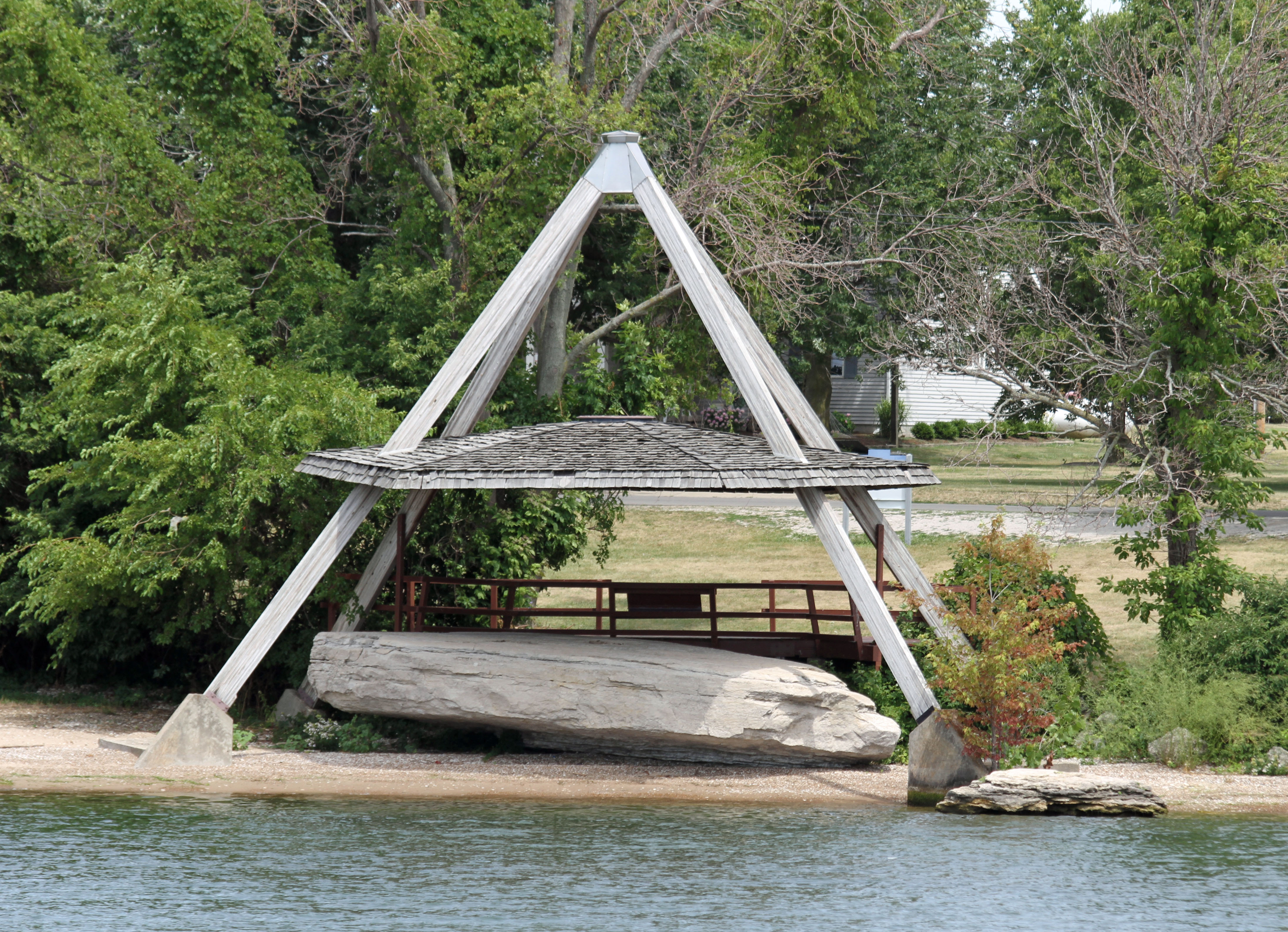
- Inscription Rock
- Interactive map of Inscription Rock
- Location: Kelleys Island, Ohio
- Coordinates: 41°35′34″N 82°42′25″W
- Area: less than one acre
- NRHP reference No.: 73001432
- Added to NRHP: June 18, 1973

Inscription Rock is a large slab of limestone measuring approximately 32 by 21 feet located on the south shore of Kelleys Island in Lake Erie in Erie County, Ohio. It is situated near the intersections of E Lakeshore Drive and Addison Rd under a large shelter structure with a viewing platform and is open to the public. The rock was listed on the National Register of Historic Places in 1973 and was also located near a series of crescent shaped mounds thought to be created by Pre-Columbian peoples. More mounds were documented to be on the island and another rock with inscriptions was located on the north shore of the island. Unlike Inscription Rock, this boulder was granite - likely a glacial erratic - and engraved with two upside-down figures. However now only Inscription Rock remains since island quarry workers dynamited the petroglyph rock on the north shore. The site is owned by the Ohio History Connection.

== Rediscovery ==
Inscription Rock was discovered partially buried in the sand of the lake shore in 1833 and by 1915, it was appearing on postcards for tourists in the area and is still a well-visited site to this day. In 1851 Col. Eastman of the United States Army was commissioned to analyze and create detailed drawings of the rock and petroglyphs. He then submitted copies to Shingvauk, a Native American with a knowledge of pictography, for further interpretation. There are over 100 images on the rock and the carvings were noted to be similar to ones used by the Haudenosaunee in Canada. Due to the soft nature of the limestone rock in the area, the carvings are generally believed to be less than 1,000 years old but the Inscription Rock remains one of the most significant and accessible examples of native petroglyphs in the area. Due to its proximity to the Lake Erie shoreline, it is under constant threat of further erosion by wind and wave activity.

== Gallery ==
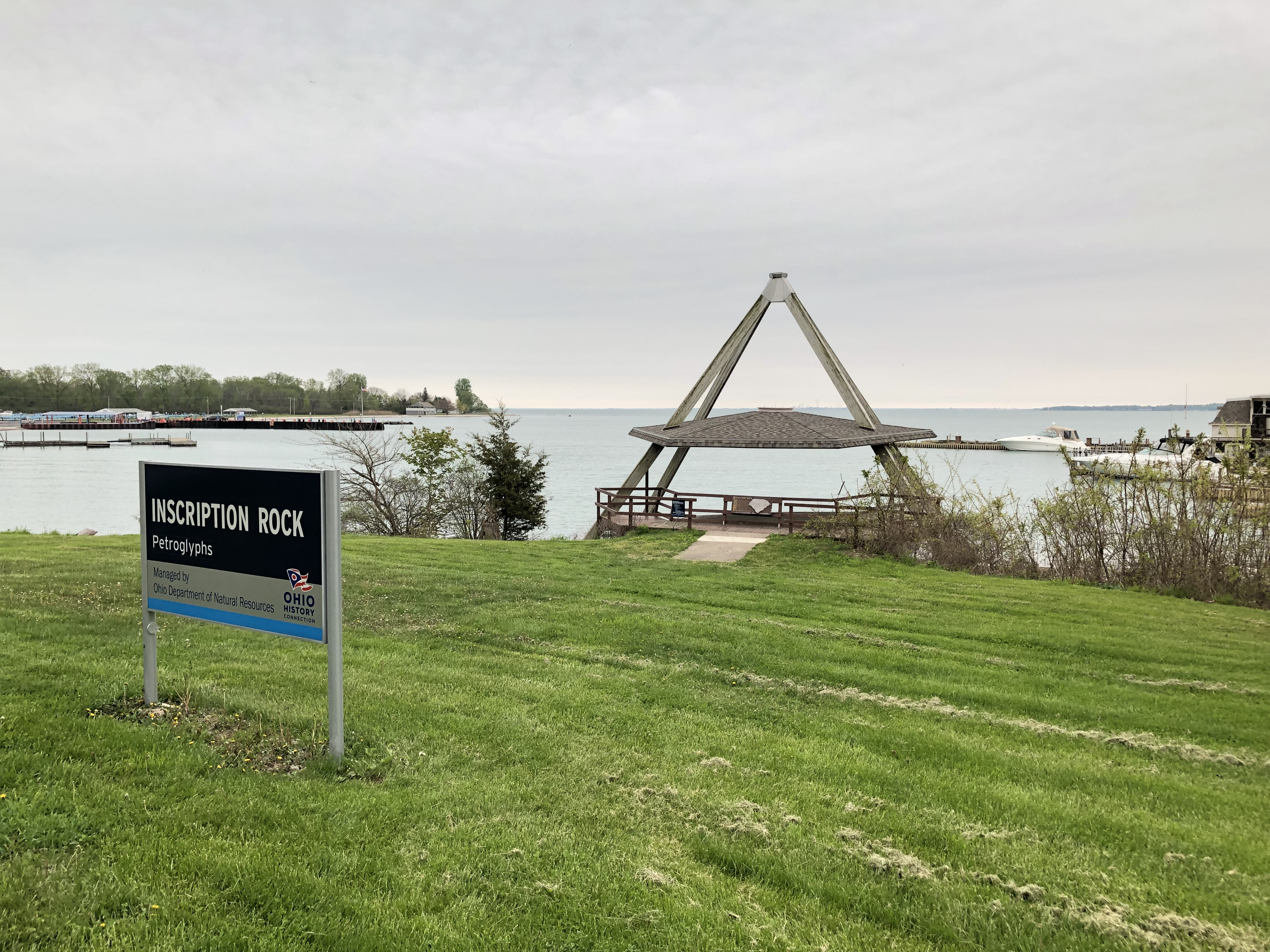
Inscription Rock from Ohio State Route 575

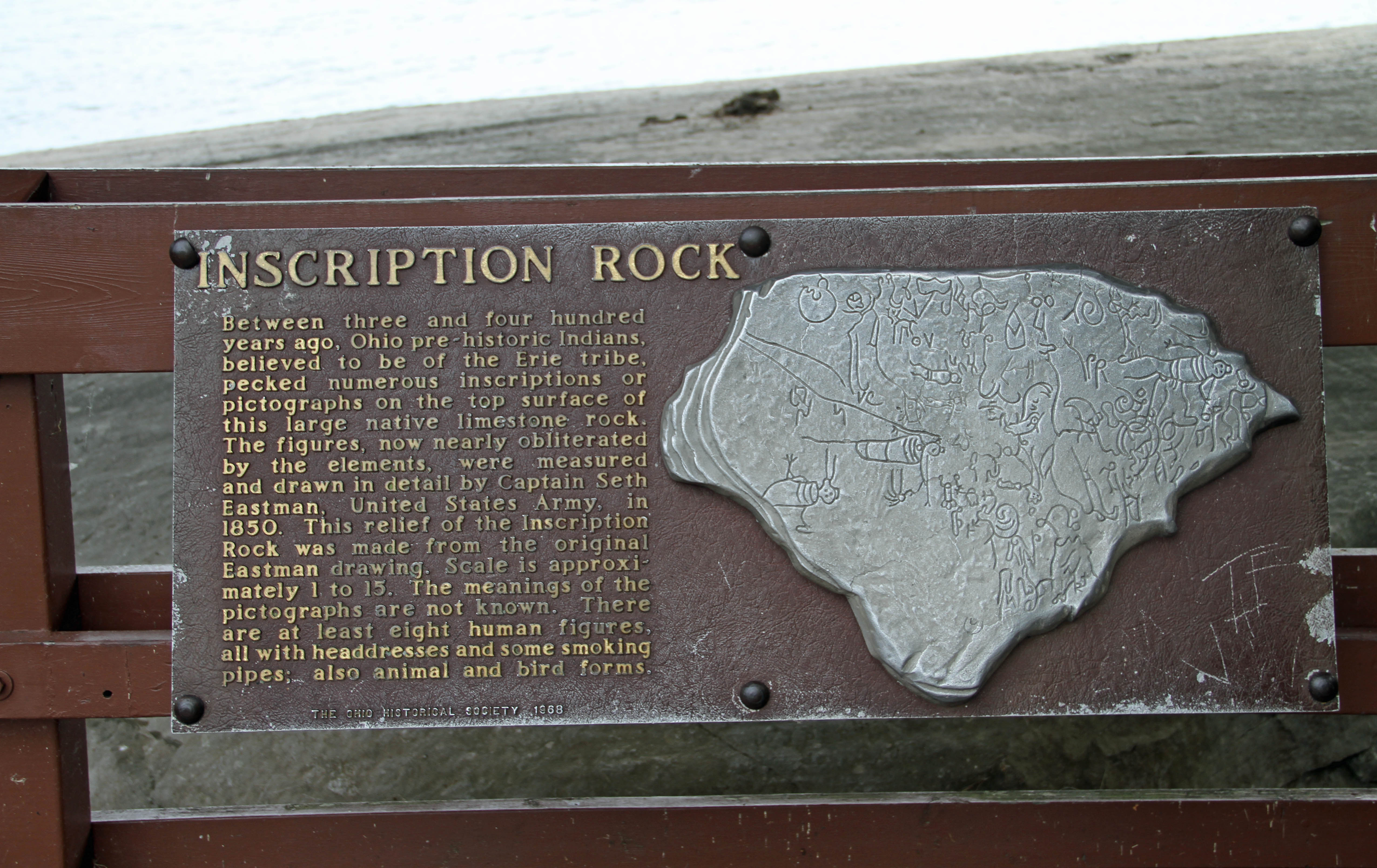
Re-creation of the drawings

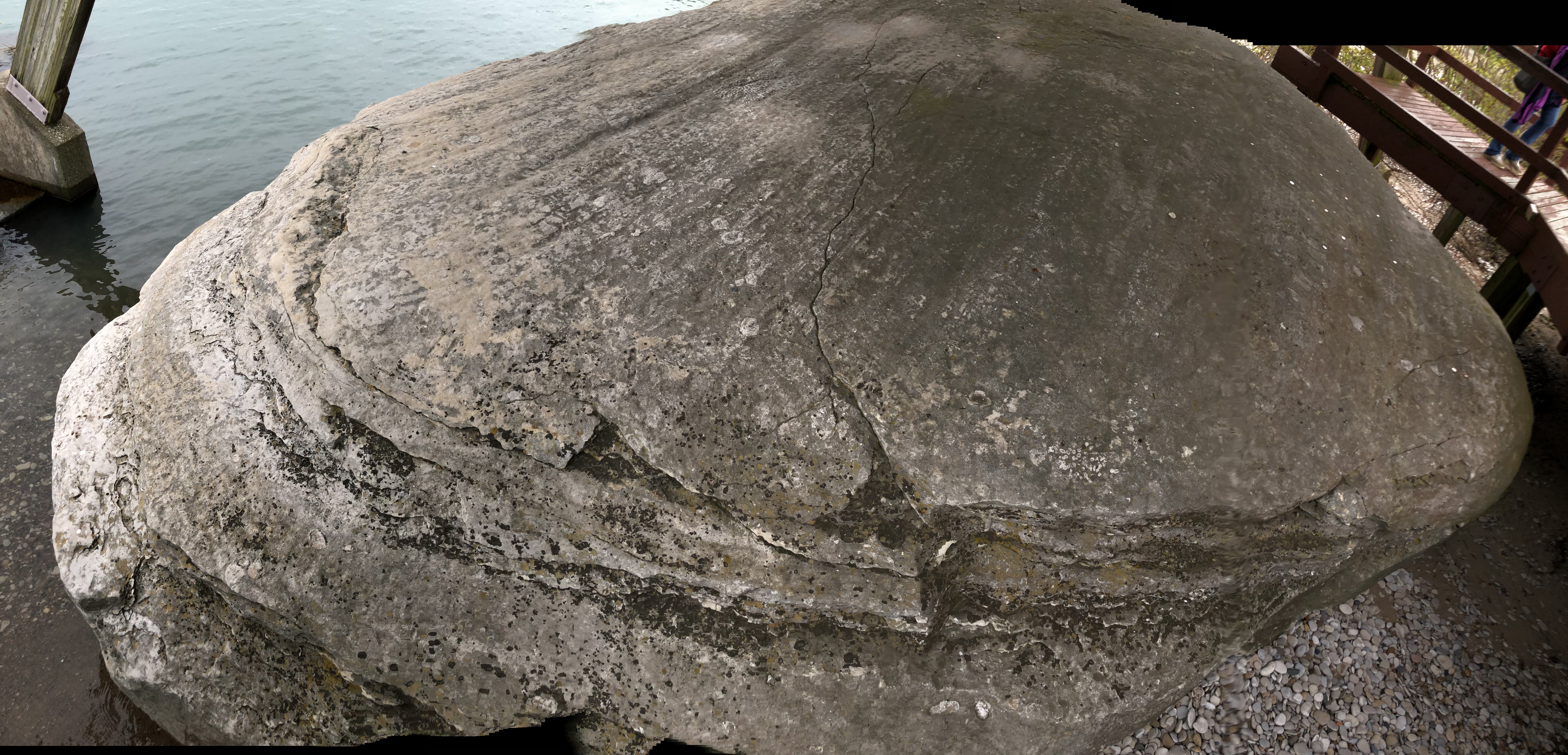
A panorama of the rock

== See also ==
- List of individual rocks
