= Kelley Island Lime & Transport Company =

Formed in 1886 on the Lake Erie Island of Kelleys Island, Ohio, the Kelleys Island Lime & Transport Company was also known by its initials, KIL&T. It was once the world's largest producer of limestone and lime. The firm began quarry operations on Kelleys Island in 1886 and was dissolved in the early 1960s.

Company operations were located in Ohio, New York, and West Virginia. Main sites were Kelleys Island (1886-1940) and nearby Marblehead, Ohio (1890s-1955). In 1922, KIL&T built the world's largest stone crushing plant at Marblehead. It also owned many lime kilns and produced lime products.

The company operated 3 ft (914 mm) gauge Shay steam locomotives to move raw stone around its quarries until World War II. KIL&T purchased 65 new Shays from the Lima Locomotive Works (Lima, Ohio) over the years.

== Shay Locomotives ==
Number	Cylinders	Wheels	Built	Works number	Assignment	Notes
	6"x10"	22"	23 May 1905	1537	Marion, Ohio	built as Norris & Christian Stone & Lime Company #1; scrapped 1922
1	9"x8"	26"	10 April 1906	1662	Marblehead, Ohio	
3	9"x8"	26"	27 March 1898	561	Kelleys Island, Ohio	named Norman Kelley
3	11"x12"	32"	25 September 1920	3112	Martin, Ohio	
4	9"x8"	26"	2o May 1898	562	Kelleys Island, Ohio	
5	6"x10"	21.5"	13 March 1899	573	Kelleys Island, Ohio	named W. M. Harsh
10	9"x8"	26"	5 May 1906	1663	Marblehead, Ohio	
14	9"x8"	26"	21 April 1906	1664	Marblehead, Ohio	
25	9"x8"	26.5"	6 April 1905	1514	Dover Plains, New York	
26	9"x8"	26.5"	17 May 1905	1515	Marblehead, Ohio	
27	9"x8"	26.5"	26 May 1905	1516	Marblehead, Ohio	
28	8"x12"	26.5"	1 May 1907	1852	Marblehead, Ohio	
29	8"x12"	26.5"	3 May 1907	1853	Marblehead, Ohio	
30	8"x12"	26.5"	4 May 1907	1854	Marblehead, Ohio	
31	8"x12"	26.5"	10 May 1907	1855	Marblehead, Ohio	named Mary Sanders
32	8"x12"	26.5"	20 May 1907	1856	Marblehead, Ohio	
33	8"x12"	26.5"	1 April 1908	2045	Sandusky, Ohio	
34	8"x12"	26.5"	20 May 1908	2046	Cleveland, Ohio	sold to General Crushed Stone Company, Le Roy, New York
35	8"x12"	26.5"	20 March 1908	2074	Sandusky, Ohio	
36	8"x12"	26.5"	20 March 1908	2075	Sandusky, Ohio	sold to General Crushed Stone Company, Akron, New York
37	8"x12"	26.5"	20 March 1908	2076	Sandusky, Ohio	
38	8"x12"	26.5"	1 April 1908	2077	Sandusky, Ohio	
39	8"x12"	26.5"	15 April 1908	2078	Sandusky, Ohio	
40	8"x12"	26.5"	15 April 1908	2079	Martin, Ohio	
41	8"x12"	26.5"	15 April 1908	2080	Sandusky, Ohio	sold to General Crushed Stone Company, Akron, New York
42	8"x12"	26.5"	1 June 1908	2081	Kelleys Island, Ohio	
43	8"x12"	26.5"	1 July 1908	2082	Kelleys Island, Ohio	
44	8"x12"	26.5"	3 July 1910	2263	Clarence, New York	sold to General Crushed Stone Company, Akron, New York
45	8"x12"	26.5"	3 July 1910	2264	Clarence, New York	sold to General Crushed Stone Company, Winchester, Massachusetts; later moved to Akron, New York
53	8"x12"	27.5"	22 March 1911	2429	Marblehead, Ohio	sold to General Crushed Stone Company, Akron, New York
54	8"x12"	27.5"	22 March 1911	2430	Clarence, New York	sold to General Crushed Stone Company, Akron, New York
55	8"x12"	27.5"	27 June 1912	2541	Sandusky, Ohio	
56	8"x12"	27.5"	9 May 1913	2638	Kelleys Island, Ohio	
57	8"x12"	27.5"	3 May 1913	2677	Kelleys Island, Ohio	
58	8"x12"	27.5"	16 May 1914	2721	Sandusky, Ohio	
59	8"x12"	27.5"	23 May 1914	2775	Sandusky, Ohio	
62	8"x12"	27.5"	3 March 1916	2851	White Rock, Ohio	
63	8"x12"	27.5"	3 March 1916	2852	White Rock, Ohio	
64	8"x8"	27.5"	17 February 1917	2898	Marblehead, Ohio	
65	8"x8"	27.5"	17 February 1917	2899	Marblehead, Ohio	
66	8"x8"	27.5"	22 February 1917	2900	Marblehead, Ohio	
67	8"x8"	27.5"	23 February 1917	2901	Marblehead, Ohio	
68	8"x8"	27.5"	27 February 1917	2902	Marblehead, Ohio	
69	8"x8"	27.5"	3 March 1917	2903	Marblehead, Ohio	
70	8"x8"	27.5"	10 March 1917	2904	Marblehead, Ohio	
71	8"x8"	27.5"	19 March 1917	2917	Marblehead, Ohio	
72	8"x8"	27.5"	19 March 1917	2918	Marblehead, Ohio	
73	8"x8"	27.5"	19 March 1917	2919	Marblehead, Ohio	
74	8"x8"	29"	30 June 1923	3218	Marblehead, Ohio	
75	8"x8"	29"	2 July 1923	3219	Marblehead, Ohio	

== See also ==
- Lakeside and Marblehead Railroad
