= Marblehead Light (Ohio) =

Lighthouse in Ohio, US

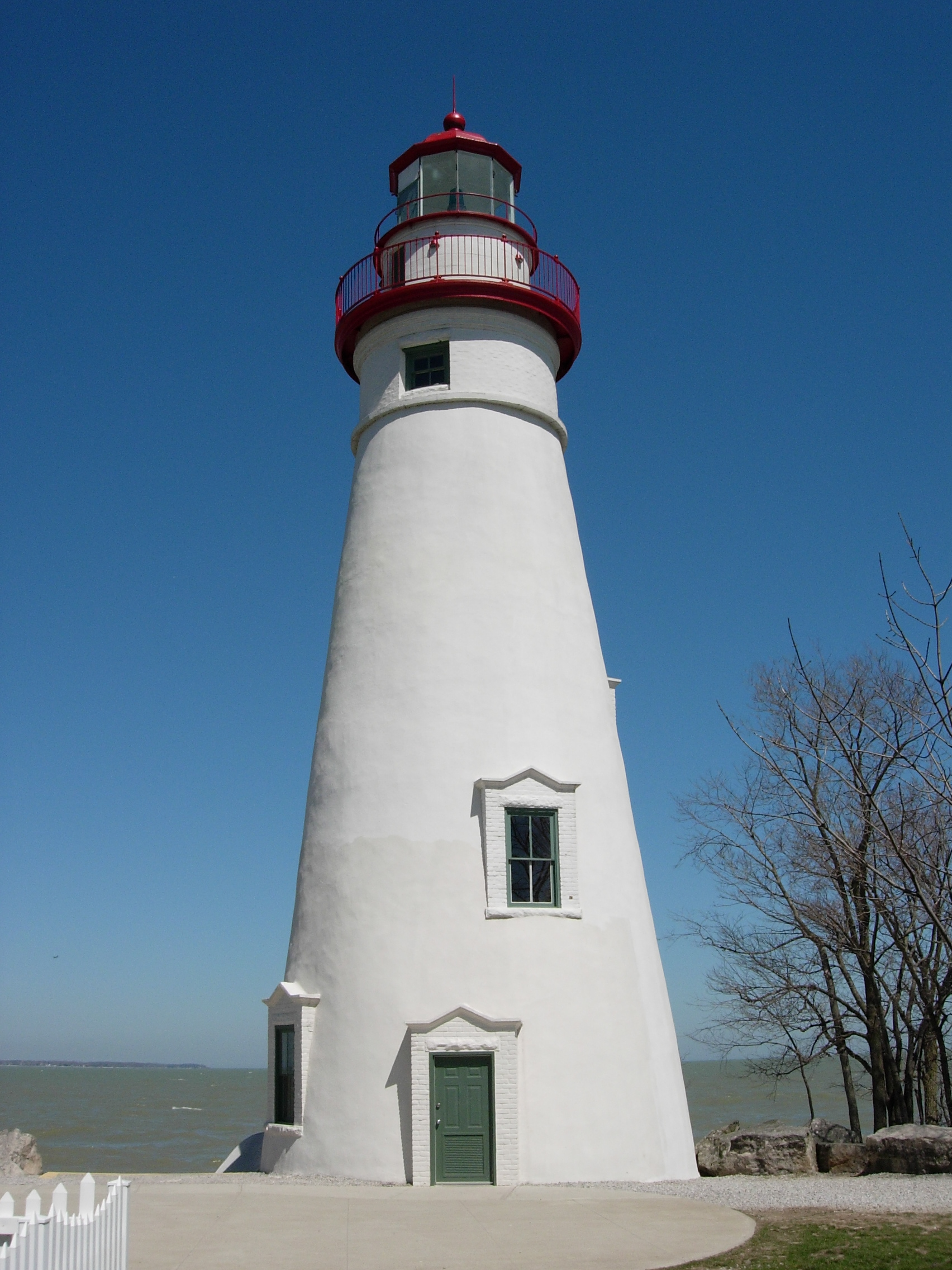
- Location: OH 163, Marblehead, Ohio
- Coordinates: 41°32′11.2″N 82°42′42.2″W

Tower
- Constructed: 1822
- Construction: limestone
- Automated: 1958
- Height: Tower – 50 feet (15 m)
- Shape: Pyramidal frustum of a cone tower
- Markings: White with red markings, parapet and roof
- Heritage: National Register of Historic Places listed place

Light
- First lit: 1822
- Focal height: 20.5 m (67 ft)
- Lens: Fresnel lens
- Range: 11 nautical miles (20 km; 13 mi)
- Characteristic: Green, flashes every 6 seconds
- Marblehead Lighthouse
- U.S. National Register of Historic Places
- Area: 4 acres (1.6 ha)
- Built: 1820
- Architect: Kelley, William
- Architectural style: Cone Shaped Lighthouse
- NRHP reference No.: 69000148
- Added to NRHP: December 17, 1969

Marblehead Lighthouse in Marblehead, Ohio, United States, is the oldest lighthouse in continuous operation on the American side of the Great Lakes. It has guided sailors safely along the rocky shores of Marblehead Peninsula since 1822, and is an active aid to navigation.

== History ==
In 1819, the fifteenth U. S. Congress recognized the need for navigational aids along the Great Lakes and set aside $5,000 for the construction of a light tower at the entrance to Sandusky Bay. In 1821, contractor William Kelly (assisted by local-area residents Amos Fenn and Wm.B. Smith) built the 50-foot (15 m) tower of native limestone on the tip of the Marblehead Peninsula. The base of the tower is 25 feet (7.6 m) in diameter, with walls 5 feet (1.5 m) thick. It narrows to 12 feet (3.7 m) at the top, with 2-foot (0.61 m) thick walls.

Before it was automated, fifteen lighthouse keepers (two of whom were women) in succession tended the beacon. The first keeper was Benajah Wolcott, a Revolutionary War veteran and one of the first settlers on the peninsula (although from 1819 to 1821, resided in the City of Sandusky.). After the completion of the lighthouse and also an adjacent stone "keeper's house" in 1821, Wolcott and his family moved into that official "keeper's house". Each night, he lit the wicks of the 13 whale oil lamps that were the original light fixture (composed of multiple metal reflectors, every sixteen inches—406 mm—in diameter, which helped project the light across the lake). Other duties of the lighthouse keeper included compiling a log of passing ships, noting the weather conditions, and organizing rescue efforts. After Wolcott died in 1832, his wife, Rachel, took over these duties (and afterward, her final husband, Jeremiah VanBenschoter, took over those same duties). In 1858, the whale oil lamps were replaced by the light from a single kerosene lantern magnified by a Fresnel lens; this specialized, curved glass lens created a highly visible, fixed white light. In 1880, the original 1821 stone keeper's-house (adjacent to the lighthouse) was replaced with the present large wood-frame Keeper's House. [ Note: these structures should not be confused with the (so-called) "Keepers' House"/Wolcott House, which is approx.3 miles (4.8 km) distant from the lighthouse.]

A lifesaving station was built one-half mile (800 m) west of the lighthouse in 1876. Lucien Clemons, who with his two brothers saved two sailors from a shipwreck off the peninsula on May 1, 1875, was named the first commander.

The turn of the century ushered in new technology as well as structural changes including the addition of another 15 feet (4.6 m) to the tower's height. A clock-like mechanism was installed to rotate the lantern, creating the appearance of a brilliant flash of light every 10 seconds. This system required that the lighthouse keeper crank the weights every three hours through the night to keep the lantern turning. An improved Fresnel lens with prism surfaces created an even more brilliant beacon.

An electric light finally replaced the kerosene lantern in 1923, dramatically increasing the intensity of the signal. During World War II, the lighthouse became strategically important for national defense. The last civilian lighthouse keeper resigned, and the United States Coast Guard assumed responsibility for the beacon in 1946.

The beacon was automated in 1958. With its original finish tattered by time and harsh weather, the exterior of the lighthouse tower was given a fresh coat of new stucco the same year.

The Ohio Department of Natural Resources has maintained the property surrounding the lighthouse since 1972 and accepted ownership of the Marblehead Lighthouse tower in May 1998. The U.S. Coast Guard continues to operate and maintain the lighthouse beacon. In 2012 an LED light was installed. Its green signal flashes every six seconds and is visible for 11 nautical miles (20 km; 13 mi). The distinctive green distinguishes the lighthouse signal from white lights coming from air beacons.

Marblehead Lighthouse was one of five lighthouses chosen for the "Lighthouses of the Great Lakes" series postage stamp designed by Howard Koslow in 1995. There was one lighthouse chosen on each of the Great Lakes. The five lighthouses are Split Rock Light on Lake Superior, St Joseph Light on Lake Michigan, Spectacle Reef Light on Lake Huron, Marblehead Light (Ohio) on Lake Erie and Thirty Mile Point Light on Lake Ontario.

In 2001-2002 the state renovated the tower and keeper's house for $500,000. In 2004 the Fresnel lens was returned to the light station from the Marblehead Coast Guard Station, where it was previously on display.

== Marblehead Lighthouse State Park ==
The lighthouse is now part of the 9-acre (3.6 ha) Marblehead Lighthouse State Park. The park features picnic tables and offers views of Lake Erie, Sandusky Bay, Kelleys Island, and South Bass Island. The Marblehead Lighthouse Historical Society operates the Marblehead Lighthouse Museum in the old keeper's house. Exhibits include the lighthouse, a Fresnel lens, ice harvesting, ice fishing, the local maritime industry, ships, a replica Lifesaving Station, local fossils, and shipwrecks.

Visitors can take tours of the lighthouse tower in the summer. The museum is open when tours are available.

In May 2010, the band Owl City featured this lighthouse in their music video for their hit single "Vanilla Twilight".

In 2016, a replica of the 1876 U.S. Lifesaving Station was built on the State Park property. The lifesaving station museum is located near the Lighthouse on the State Park Property and features a variety of exhibits and an authentically restored 27-foot Coast Guard rescue boat complete with a launching railway.
