= Benajah Wolcott House =

- U.S. National Register of Historic Places
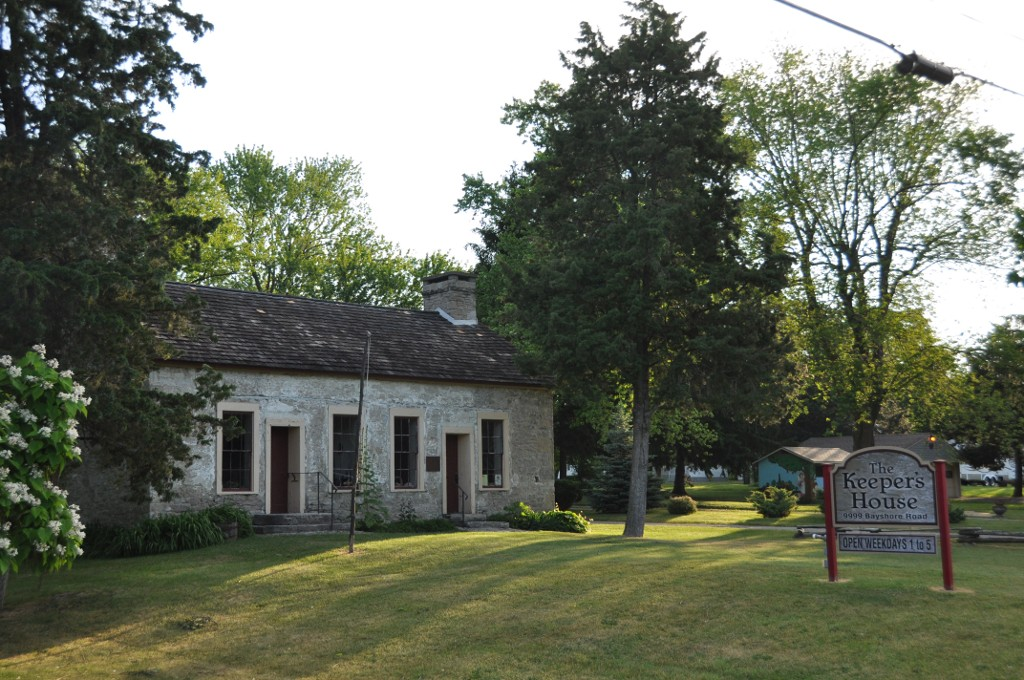

- Location within Ohio
- Location: 9999 E. Bay Shore Rd., Danbury Township, Ohio
- Coordinates: 41°30′52″N 82°44′54″W
- Area: less than one acre
- NRHP reference No.: 91000251
- Added to NRHP: March 14, 1991

Benajah Wolcott House (Keeper's House) is a stone structure on the Danbury-Marblehead Peninsula, north of Sandusky Bay near Marblehead, Ohio. It is the oldest surviving home in Ottawa County. Historians believe it may have been the family home of the Wolcott family during the 1820s. It should not be confused with the wooden lighthouse keeper's house adjacent to the Marblehead Light, built in 1880.

== Origins ==
Due to conflicting records, it's unclear whether the stone 'Keeper's House' was actually the home of Marblehead Light (Ohio) lighthouse keeper Benajah Wolcott during his 1822–32 tenure. Records indicate that +++ members of the Wolcott family purchased the land from Seth Steel in the early 1830s. However, Benajah Wolcott was never the landowner, according to official property records.

The house stands 2 miles from the lighthouse, in approximately the center of original "Lot 15", whereas Wolcott's property in the area was within the original "Lot 17" beginning in the year 1808. Local custom states that Wolcott had the stone Keeper's House built as a wedding present for Rachel Miller on their 1822 marriage. He also owned property in Sandusky, Ohio. After the marriage, Wolcott may have lived there between shipping seasons. After Wolcott’s death in 1832, Rachel and their son lived in the home until 1896, when it was sold to an owner outside the family. The Keeper’s House was occupied from 1822 until the last residential owners died in 1987. In 1989, the Ottawa County Historical Society purchased the home, restored it and maintains it as a historical museum with tours and special events.

Disproved historical legends are associated with the land on which the Keeper's House stands. One relates to the War of 1812: some local historians previously (erroneously) suggested that it was the former site of Wolcott's first "log cabin" — and therefore theorized that it was within "Wolcott's" log-cabin where several dozen Ohio soldiers and local citizens sought refuge during a "skirmish with Indians" in September 1812. Although the location was right, a man called Paterson owned the cabin. Wolcott said his first home was not a log-cabin, but a frame-structure house, which was burned to the ground by Native Americans or the British military, at the beginning of the War of 1812.)

Another local folk legend claiming the "Wolcott House" to be the "Keeper's House" is the story that Wolcott walked the 2 mile distance from this property to the Marblehead lighthouse every night to light the beacon. In fact, Wolcott may well have resided at a different stone house right beside the lighthouse. The wood-frame lighthouse keeper's house replaced the stone property in 1880.
