= Lakeside and Marblehead Railroad =

Overview
- Headquarters: Marblehead, Ohio
- Locale: Marblehead, Ohio to Danbury, Ohio
- Dates of operation: 1886–1964

Technical
- Track gauge: 4 ft 8 1/2 in (1,435 mm) standard gauge

Incorporated on April 17, 1886, at Marblehead, Ohio, the Lakeside and Marblehead Railroad (L&M) was a short standard gauge railroad that spanned about seven miles (11 km) in length. It extended from Marblehead through Lakeside to a connection with the Lake Shore and Michigan Southern Railway (later the New York Central Railroad) at Danbury (an unincorporated hamlet bordering Sandusky Bay). A common carrier, it carried both freight and passengers. It was abandoned as a common carrier railroad July 31, 1964, operated for the last time as a private industrial railroad in Summer 1978, and its tracks were removed in Fall 1997.

The L&M was primarily a limestone hauler for the stone quarries at Marblehead. These firms sent out thousands of carloads per year of shell or "flux" stone to be consumed by blast furnaces across the midwestern United States in the process of making steel. When the original promoters were unable to build enough traffic to keep the line financially afloat, the railroad was purchased by the Cleveland, Ohio-based Kelley Island Lime & Transport Company (KIL&T) January 1, 1891, as its first step in buying out all of the quarries of Marblehead. After integrating these quarries into one large operation, KIL&T also used the L&M to move stone between various lime kilns and processing facilities. The line remained under control of KIL&T and its successors for its entire existence.

== Origin ==
The Lakeside and Marblehead Railroad was the successor of the Cleveland, Toledo and Lakeside Railway, which was incorporated April 18, 1885, to build a steam railroad from the stone quarries at Marblehead to the tracks of the Lake Shore and Michigan Southern at Danbury. The CT&L was promoted locally by Edgar H. Brennan, a civil engineer, who was unable to find enough financial capital to begin construction. The following year, Brennan made contact with Hiram A. Blood and a syndicate of other railroad promoters based in Massachusetts, who bought out the interests of the CT&L, incorporated the L&M, and began construction on or about October 1, 1886. The line was finished by the end of December. The first revenue freight ran on the line January 3, 1887, and passenger service opened January 17, 1887.

== Freight and passenger service ==
The L&M at its opening used an American-type steam locomotive with a 4-4-0 wheel arrangement. It soon traded this machine to the Cleveland & Canton Railroad in exchange for a steam switch locomotive with a 0-6-0 wheel arrangement. The L&M owned an assortment of only 0-6-0 models over the years until the last steam locomotive left its property on January 31, 1953. The line's first two diesel-electric locomotives were General Electric 70-ton models. These were succeeded by one General Motors SW7 and two General Motors SW8 locomotives. Freight volume peaked in 1953, when the line hauled 3,134,403 tons of freight in 46,809 cars, almost all of which was outbound limestone.

L&M passengers were carried at first with steam trains, then, beginning in 1910, with two gasoline rail motor cars. The first motor car was a four-wheeled Fairbanks-Morse Model 24 carrying 35 passengers. The second, which operated from 1916 to 1930, was a 55-foot (17 m) McKeen car carrying 48 passengers. Passenger ridership peaked around 1904 at roughly 19,000 passengers per year.

== Cooperation with an interurban ==
The Toledo, Port Clinton and Lakeside Railway (TPC&L), a standard gauge electric interurban railroad, was built to Marblehead in 1905 and also began to serve Lakeside and Marblehead, the only two major settlements on the L&M, with passenger and freight service. Although steam railroads and interurbans were usually very fierce rivals, the L&M welcomed the new line with open arms because it provided a new outlet for freight traffic aside from its connection with the Lake Shore and Michigan Southern Railway. The two made a connection at a point named Violet, near Church Road, in rural Danbury Township, until the TPC&L's track was abandoned in 1940.

In 1907, the L&M leased to the TPC&L a short section track extending from Marblehead to Ohlemacher's Dock, which faced north into Lake Erie. The TPC&L electrified the track and sent its cars over it to meet ferry boats that took passengers from Marblehead to Sandusky. This arrangement ultimately proved unfavorable, so in 1911, the L&M built and leased to the TPC&L a new track extension extending south from Marblehead to a dock facing south into Sandusky Bay at Bay Point, where ferry boats took passengers to Cedar Point and Sandusky over a shorter and much more direct route. This arrangement remained in place until June 30, 1926.

== Later years ==
In 1955, the Kelley Island Lime & Transport Company sold the L&M and the Marblehead stone quarries to Chemstone Corporation, a subsidiary of Minerals Corporation of America. Chemstone continued to operate the railroad as a common carrier, but freight volume quickly dropped as customers moved elsewhere and modernization of the quarry infrastructure required less use of the railroad. In 1962, Chemstone sold the quarry and railroad to the Youngstown, Ohio-based Standard Slag Company. Standard Slag quickly completed modernization of the quarries to mine the lower layers of dolomitic limestone then available. Stone was then moved around the quarry on conveyor belts and all outbound stone was shipped via lake freighter, making the railroad largely obsolete. Only a handful of non-quarry customers remained; not enough to keep the L&M financially afloat.

The Lakeside and Marblehead Railroad was abandoned July 31, 1964, after hauling 85,280,000 tons of freight and almost 570,000 revenue passengers. Its property and infrastructure were transferred to Standard Slag, which kept it largely intact, operating it occasionally over the years for customers who preferred to receive stone by rail rather than water. The last train operated in November 1978, with Standard Slag locomotive number 51 (ex-L&M 14).

Standard Slag sold the quarry and railroad to Lafarge Corporation in 1989. Lafarge scrapped the final locomotive in June 1995, and most of the line beginning in September 1997.

== Present day ==
The railroad's depot at Lakeside, Ohio, was restored in 2003 and is now used as a multi-purpose meeting facility. The railroad's Danbury depot has been moved to Fremont, Ohio, for use as a business. The line's engine houses and station in Marblehead are gone.

A portion of the line's right-of-way in Lakeside is now a walking path. None of the line's rolling stock survives. A few sections of original track remain within Lafarge's quarry property.

== Archiving and preservation ==
In 1992 two teenagers from Marblehead, Ohio, David Koran and Michael Crawford, began a research project of archiving, photographing, and researching the abandoned properties of the Lakeside and Marblehead Railroad and the local stone quarries. The research contributed to the formation of The Marblehead Quarry and Railroad Preservation Group in 1994, a non profit organization that was later dissolved in 2005. The results of the preservation work was published on a series of websites including now defunct The Marblehead Quarry History Site in 2004. Material was also used to research a series of local books on the Lakeside and Marblehead Railroad and its quarries. Much of the remaining archives of the Group are pending donation to local museums.

A small collection of materials, primarily consisting of correspondence to and from the company, is held at the Center for Archival Collections at Bowling Green State University in Bowling Green, Ohio under the catalog number MS-177.
