= Danbury Local School District =

School district in Ohio

Coordinates: 41°32′N 82°45′W

Location
- Marblehead, Ohio; U.S.

District information
- Type: Public School District
- Motto: "Danbury Local Schools will instill within each student a drive for personal excellence, lifelong learning, and a distinct set of core values that positively impact family and community."

Students and staff
- Students: Grades K-12

Other information
- Website: https://www.danburyschools.org/

Danbury Local School District is a school district in Northwest Ohio. The school district serves students who live in the city, community, and township of Danbury Twp., Marblehead, and Lakeside located in Ottawa County.

== Grades 9-12 ==
- Danbury High School.

== Grades 5-8 ==
- Danbury Middle School.

== Grades K-4 ==
- Danbury Elementary School.
