= Kelleys Island State Park =

Park in Ohio, USA

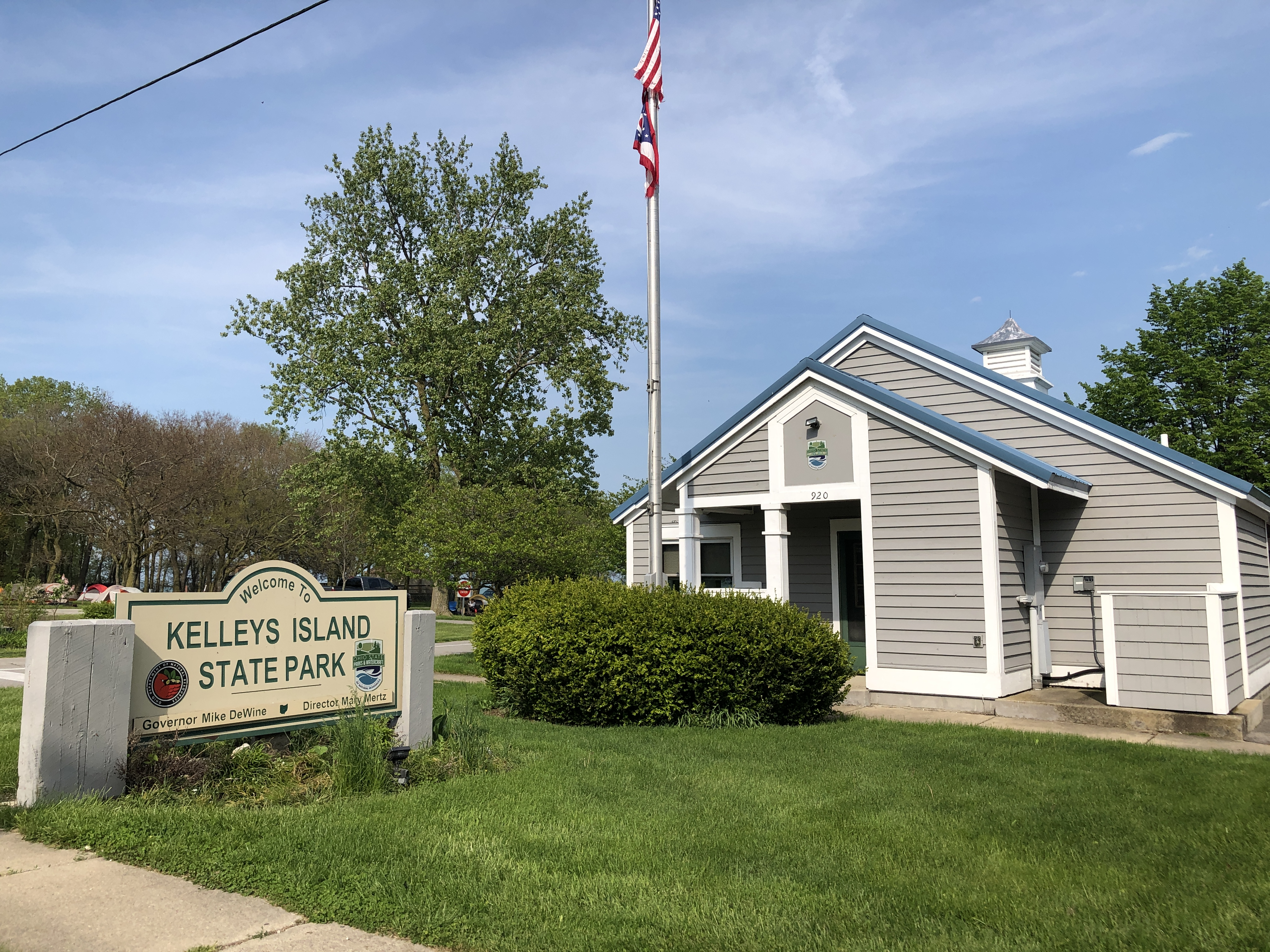
- Park entrance

- Location within Ohio Location within the United States
- Location: Erie County, Ohio, United States
- Coordinates: 41°36′51″N 82°42′19″W
- Area: 676 acres (274 ha)
- Elevation: 581 ft (177 m)
- Established: 1956
- Administrator: Ohio Department of Natural Resources
- Designation: Ohio state park
- Website: Kelleys Island State Park

Kelleys Island State Park is a public recreation area occupying one-quarter of Kelleys Island, an island in Lake Erie located 13 miles (21 km) northeast of Port Clinton, Ohio, in the United States. The state park's 677 acres (274 ha) include six miles (9.7 km) of hiking trails, ruins of lime kilns and quarrying operations, sand beach, and campground. The park was established in 1956. The park cooperates with other agencies to manage the adjoining Glacial Grooves State Memorial, a set of rare glacial grooves, North Shore Alvar State Natural Area, a rare alvar habitat, and the North Pond State Nature Preserve, a lake embayment usually separated from the lake by a sand bar.

== Gallery ==
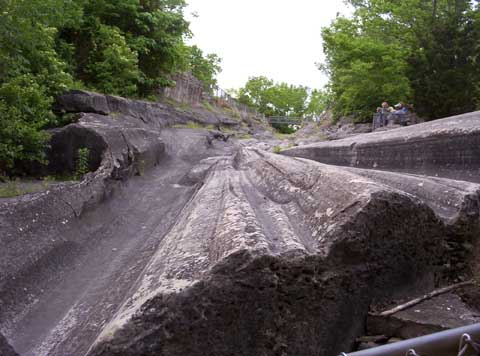
The famous glacial grooves of Kelleys Island.

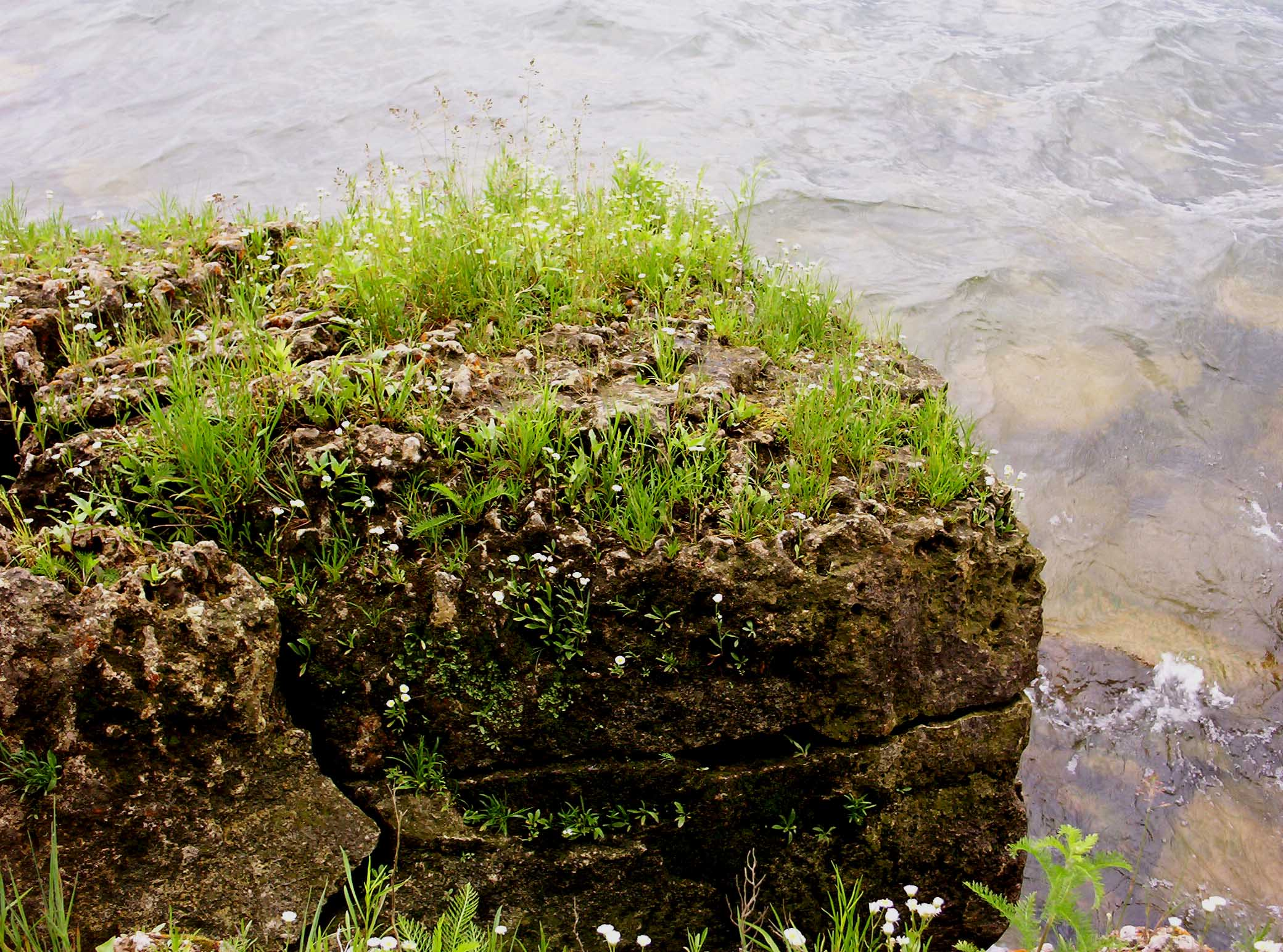
A close up of alvar in the state park.

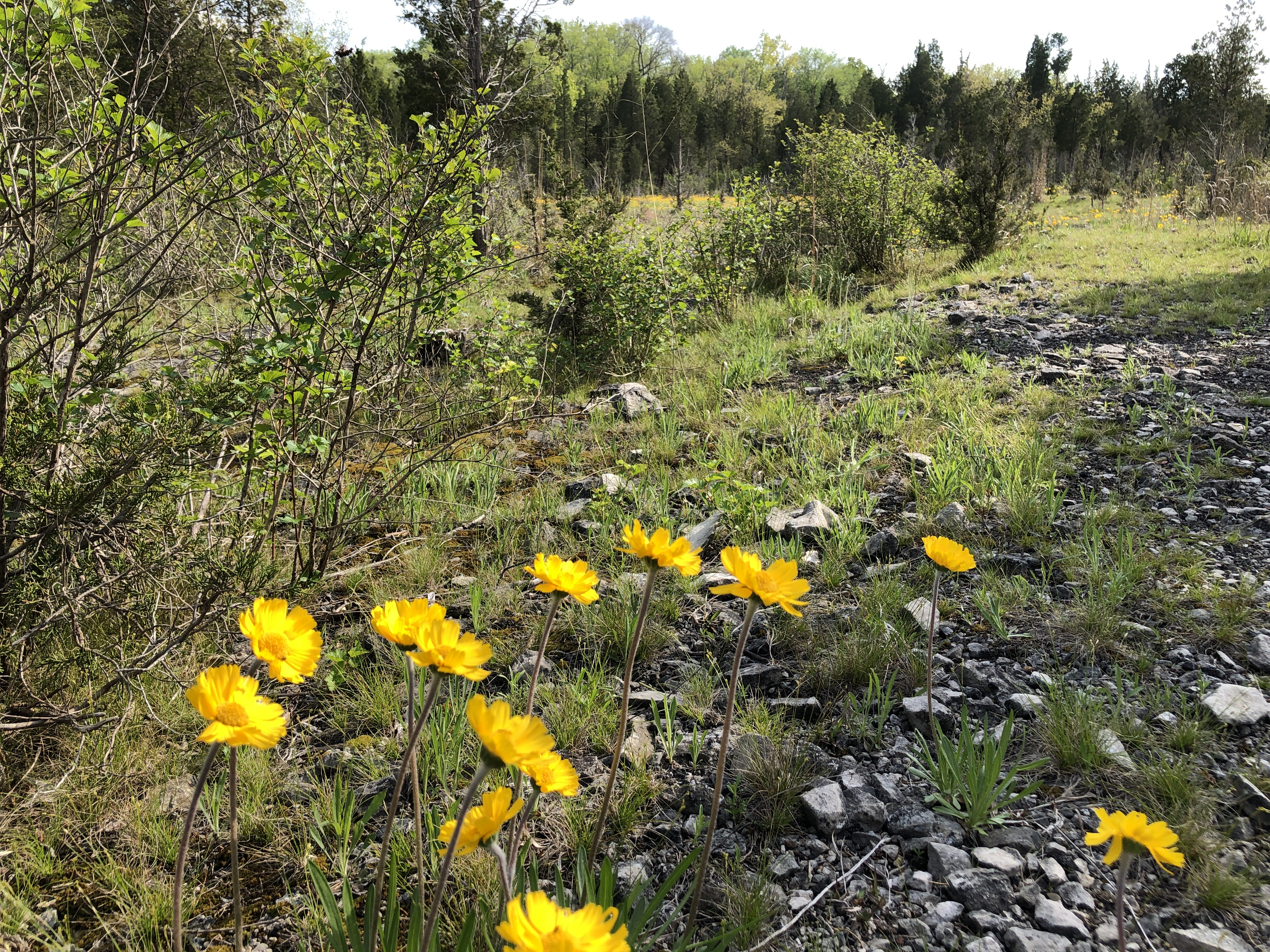
Lakeside daises in the state park.

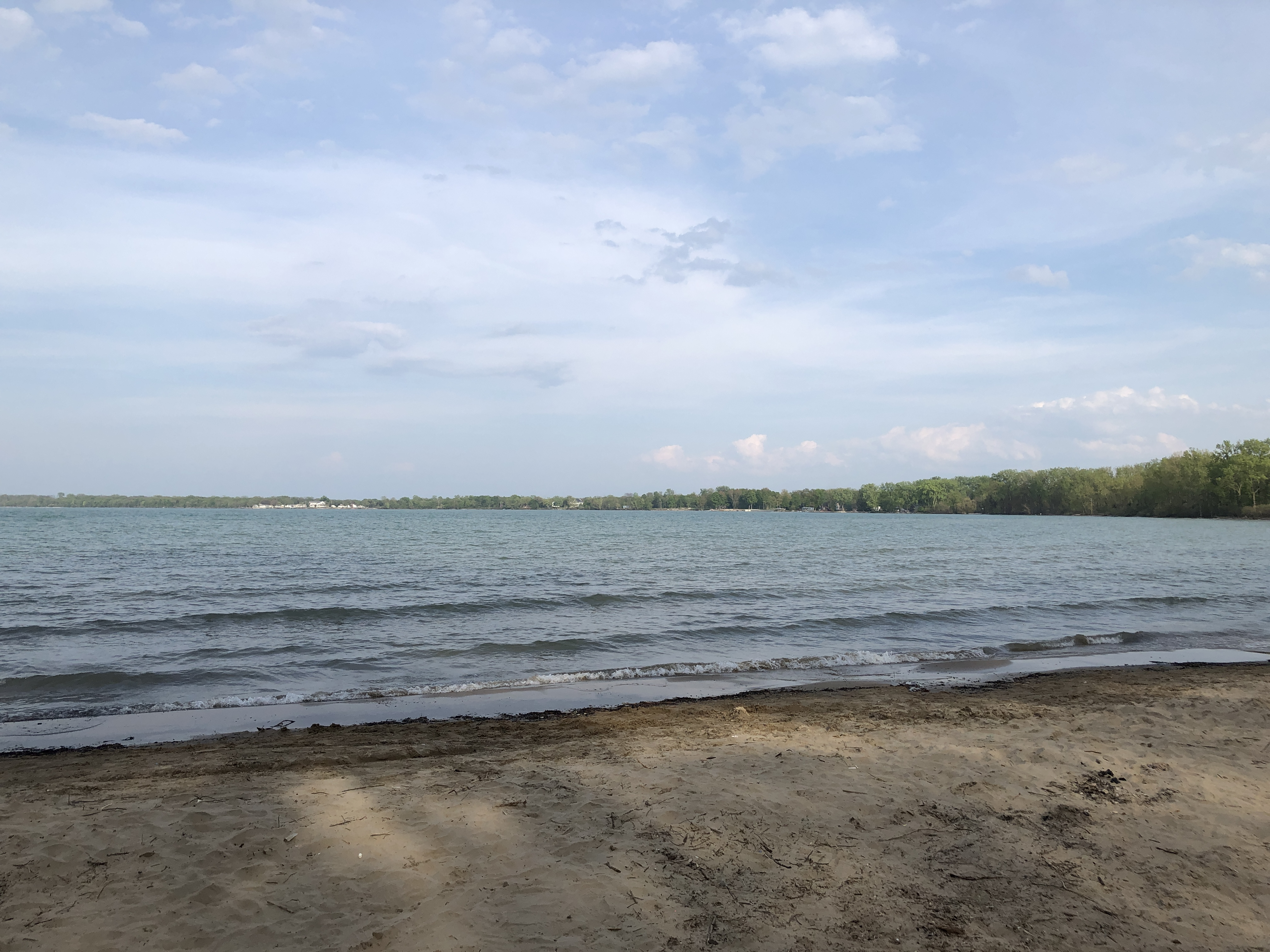
The park's public beach.

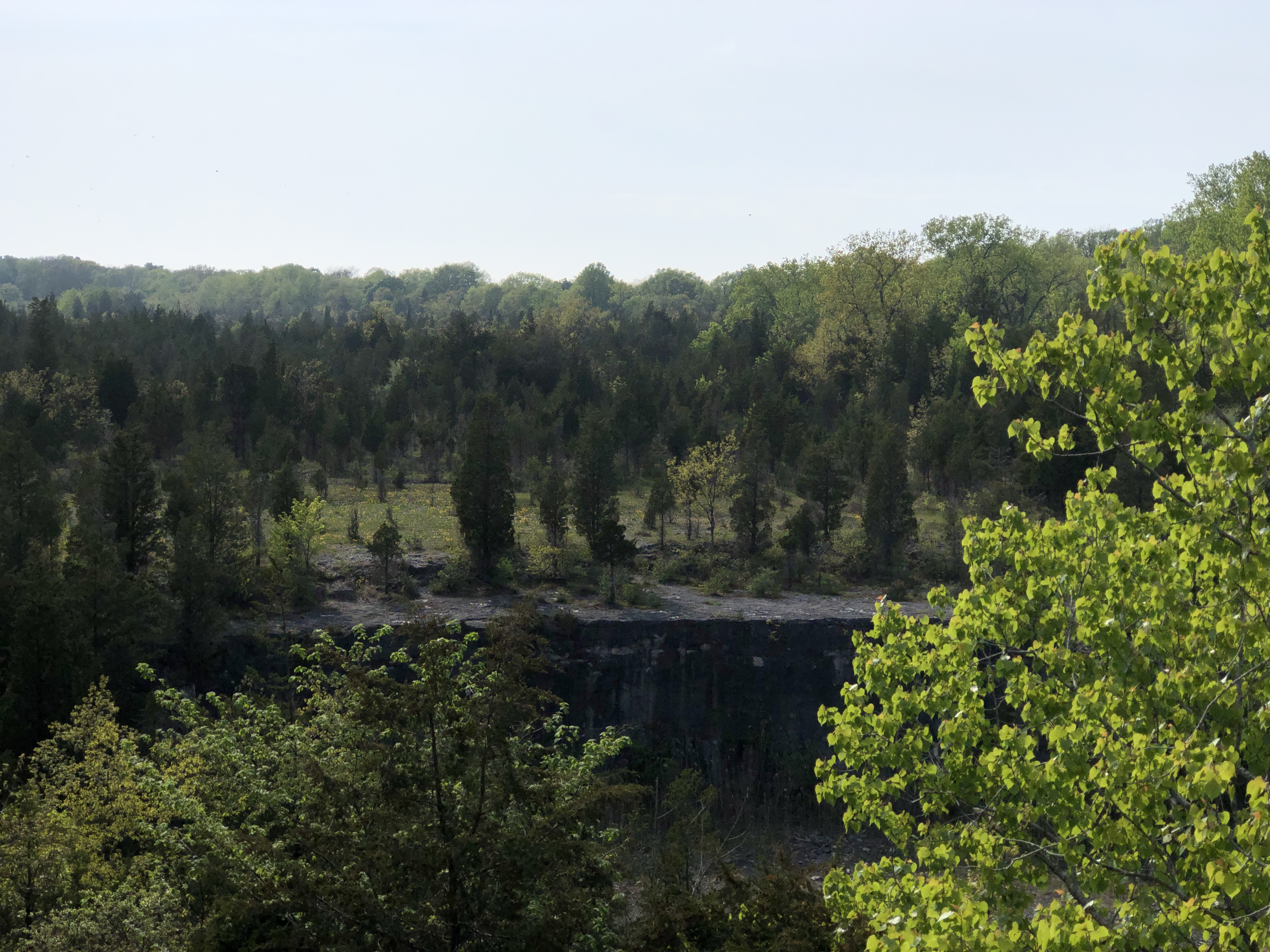
Former quarries cause dramatic cliffs like these.

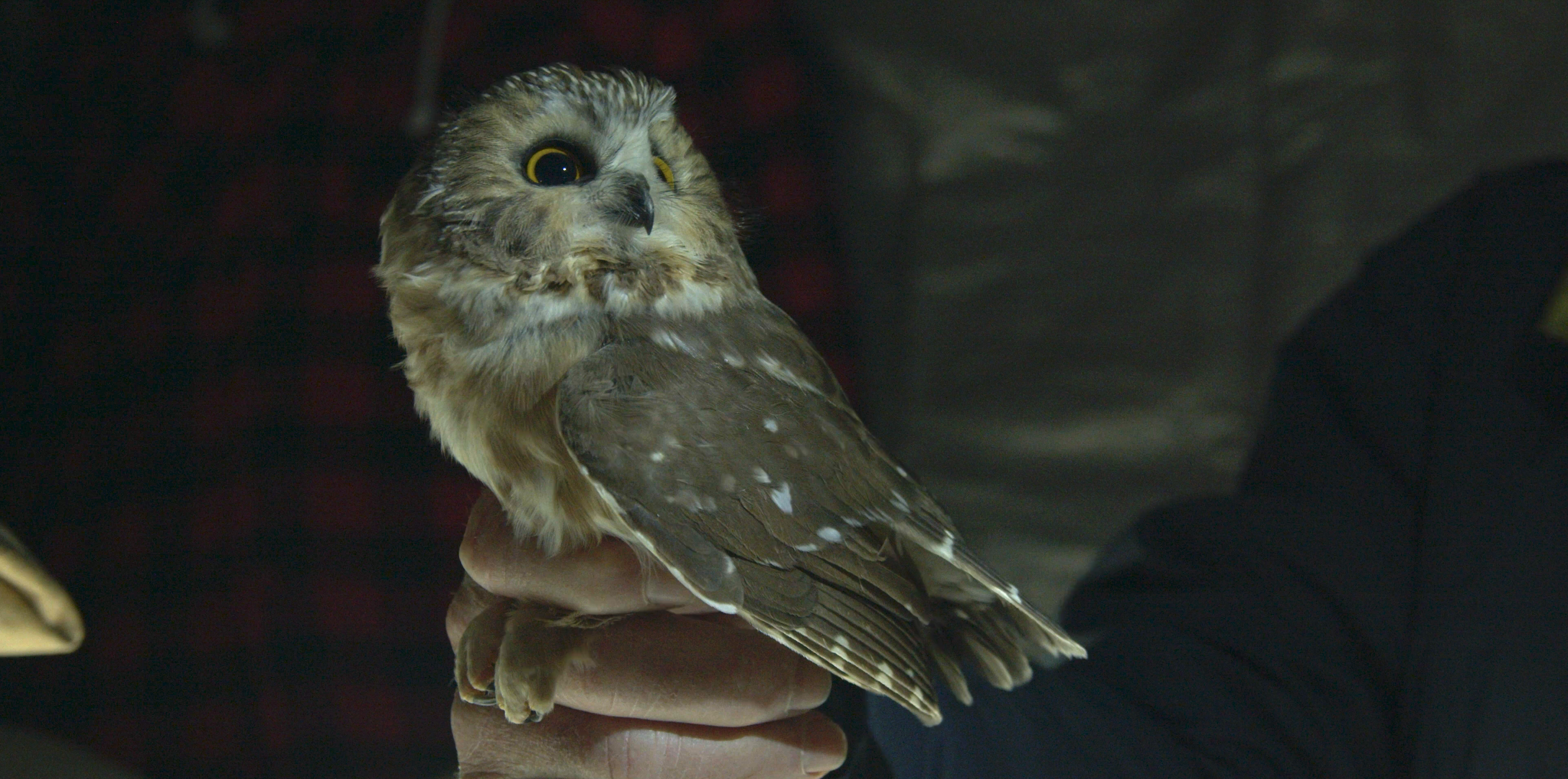
Northern saw-whet owl caught during annual Kelleys Island Owl Banding.
