= Ohio State Route 575 =

State highway in Erie County, Ohio, US

State Route 575
- SR 575 highlighted in red

Route information
- Maintained by ODOT
- Length: 2.60 mi (4.18 km)
- Existed: 1937–present

Major junctions
- South end: Neumans Ferry Dock in Kelleys Island
- North end: Division Street in Kelleys Island

Location
- Country: United States
- State: Ohio
- Counties: Erie

Highway system
- Ohio State Highway System; Interstate; US; State; Scenic
← SR 574	→ SR 576

State Route 575 (SR 575) is a 2.60-mile-long (4.18 km) north–south state highway located in the northern portion of the U.S. state of Ohio. The route is located entirely within the western half of Kelleys Island, one of the Lake Erie Islands. The highway runs from its southern terminus at the Neumans Ferry Dock at the south end of the island to its northern terminus at a T-intersection with Division Street in the northern part of the island. This highway, along with SR 357 on South Bass Island, is isolated from the rest of Ohio, and all other Ohio state highways. The route was created in 1937 and has not changed since.

== Route description ==
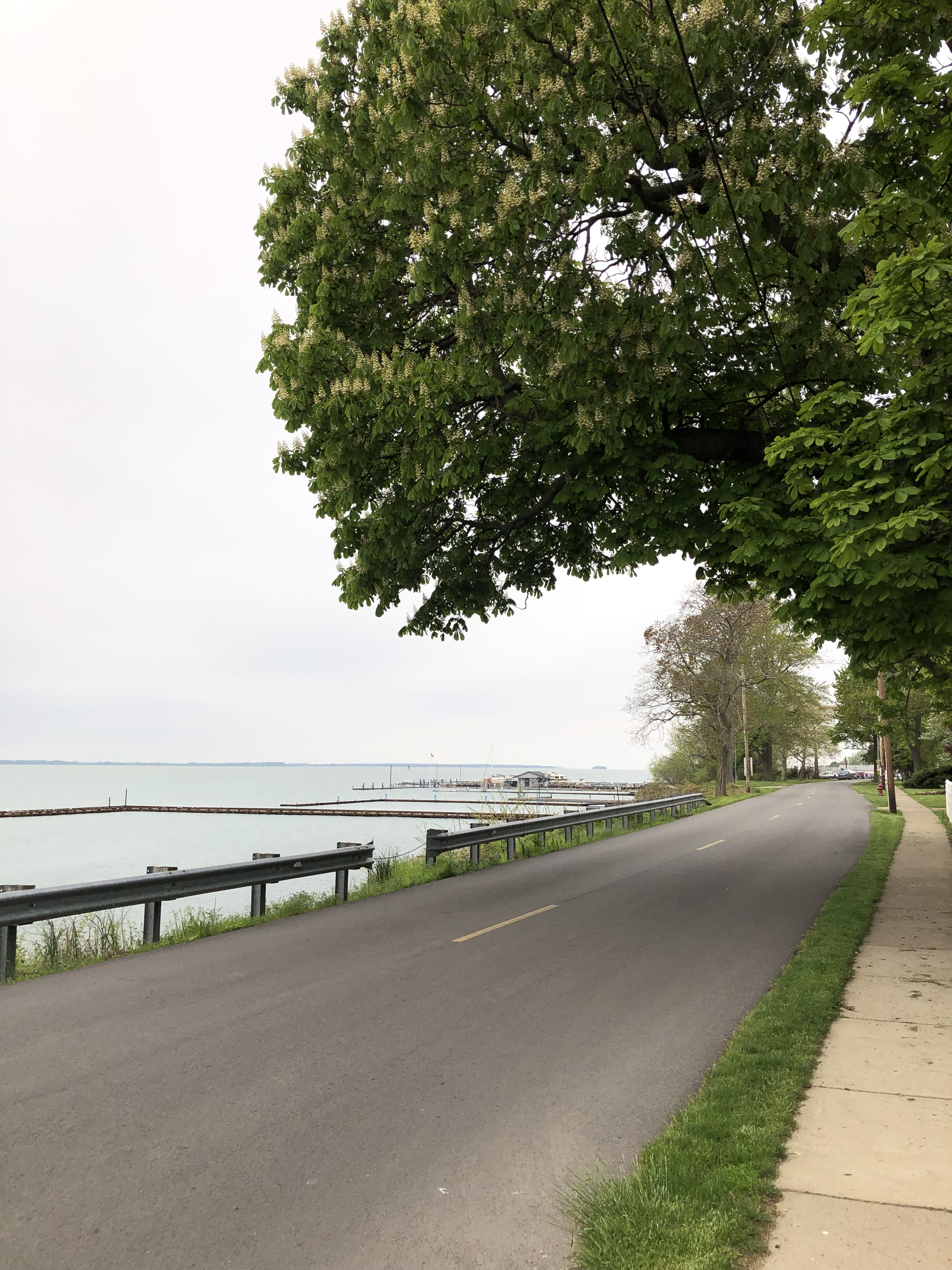
The route follows the shore of Lake Erie.

SR 575 is located in Erie County on the western portion of the island of, and within the village of, Kelleys Island in Lake Erie. The route begins at the former Neuman's Ferry Dock, where the first ferry that connected the island with Marblehead on the mainland was based. It follows West Lakeshore Drive heading northwest from that point. Lake Erie abuts the highway on the southwest side, while a number of residences appear on the northeast side. SR 575 curves to the north and then to the northeast as it passes the westernmost point of Kelleys Island. SR 575 then follows a sharp curve that takes it inland at a transition from West Lakeshore Drive onto Titus Road. For the majority of its remaining length, SR 575 travels in an east-northeasterly fashion, passing amidst heavy woods, and coming to an end where it meets Division Street at a T-intersection. Some 790 vehicles use SR 575 on average each day.

== History ==
SR 575 was applied in 1937. Since its inception, the highway has maintained a presence on Kelleys Island, and has utilized the same routing throughout its lifespan. The road underwent repaving in 1994.

== Major intersections ==
The entire route is in Kelleys Island, Erie County.

mi	km	Destinations	Notes
0.00	0.00	Division Street	Southern terminus, becomes East Lakeshore Drive
2.60	4.18	Division Street	Northern terminus, a T-intersection
1.000 mi = 1.609 km; 1.000 km = 0.621 mi
