= Kelleys Island, Ohio =

- Village
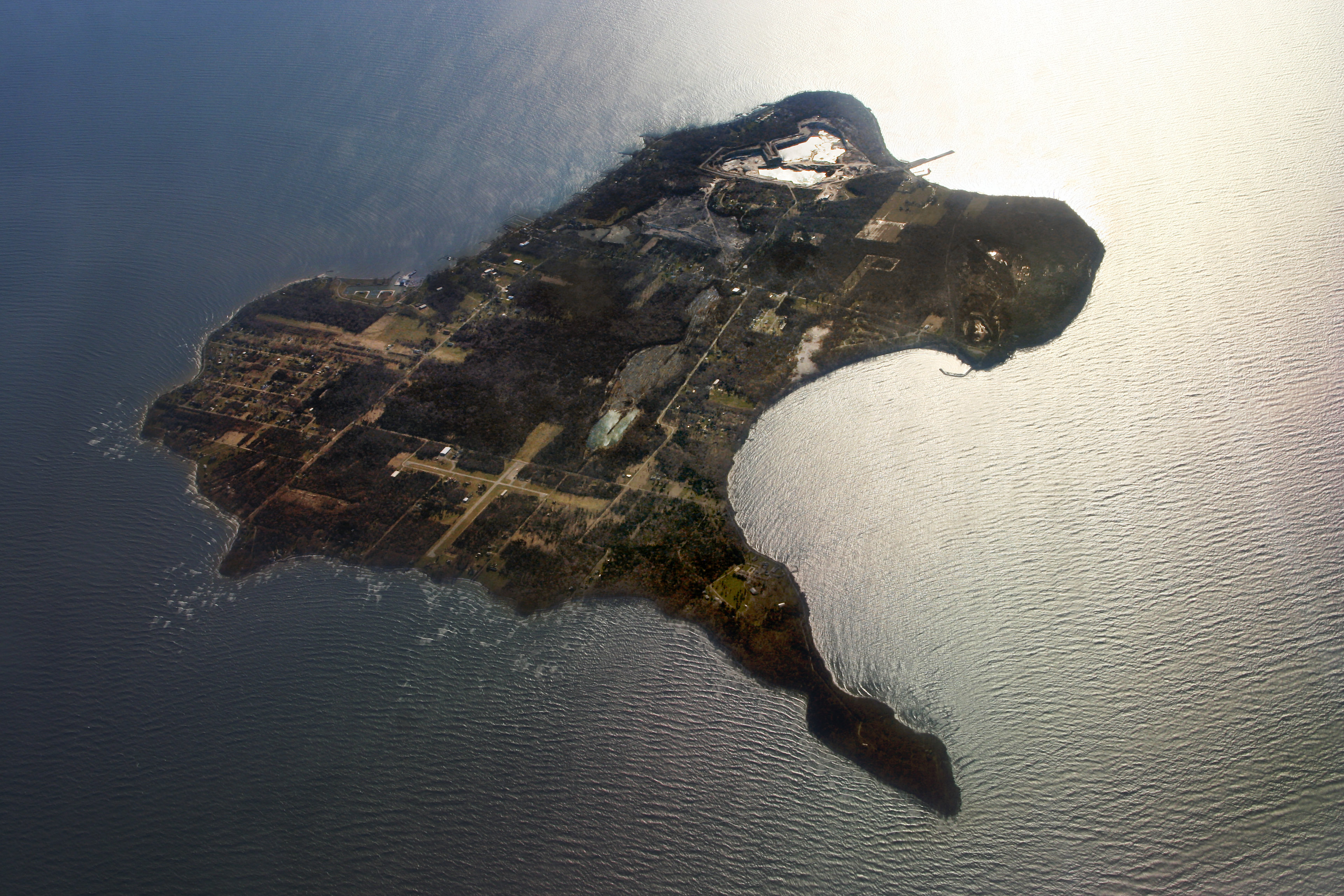
- Aerial photo of Kelleys Island, looking west
- Nickname: Kelleys
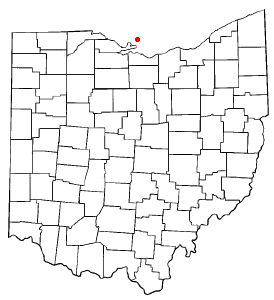
- Location of Kelleys Island, Ohio

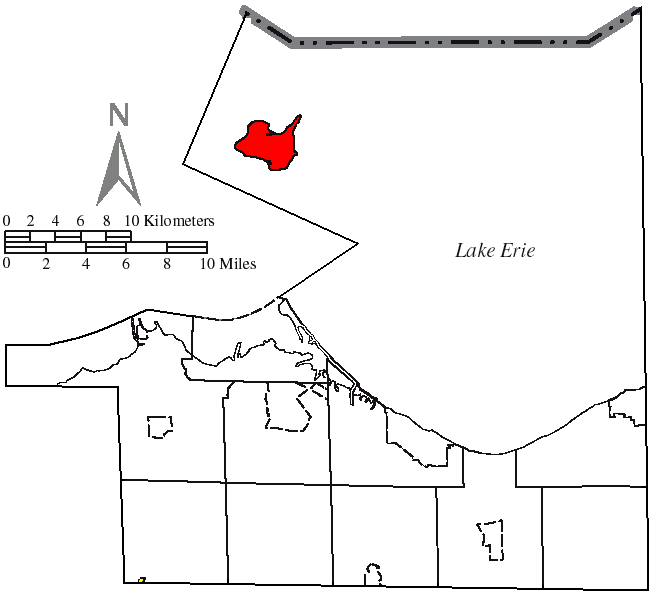
- Location of Kelleys Island in Erie County
- Coordinates: 41°36′12″N 82°42′10″W
- Country: United States
- State: Ohio
- County: Erie

Government
  - Mayor: Ron Ehrbar

Area
  - Total: 4.41 sq mi (11.41 km^{2})
  - Land: 4.35 sq mi (11.26 km^{2})
  - Water: 0.058 sq mi (0.15 km^{2})
- Elevation: 614 ft (187 m)

Population (2020)
  - Total: 256
  - Density: 58.9/sq mi (22.73/km^{2})
- Time zone: UTC-5 (Eastern (EST))
  - Summer (DST): UTC-4 (EDT)
- ZIP code: 43438
- Area code: 419
- FIPS code: 39-39662
- GNIS feature ID: 1086065
- Website: kelleysisland.us

- Kelleys Island South Shore District; Kelleys Island Historic District
- U.S. National Register of Historic Places
- U.S. Historic district
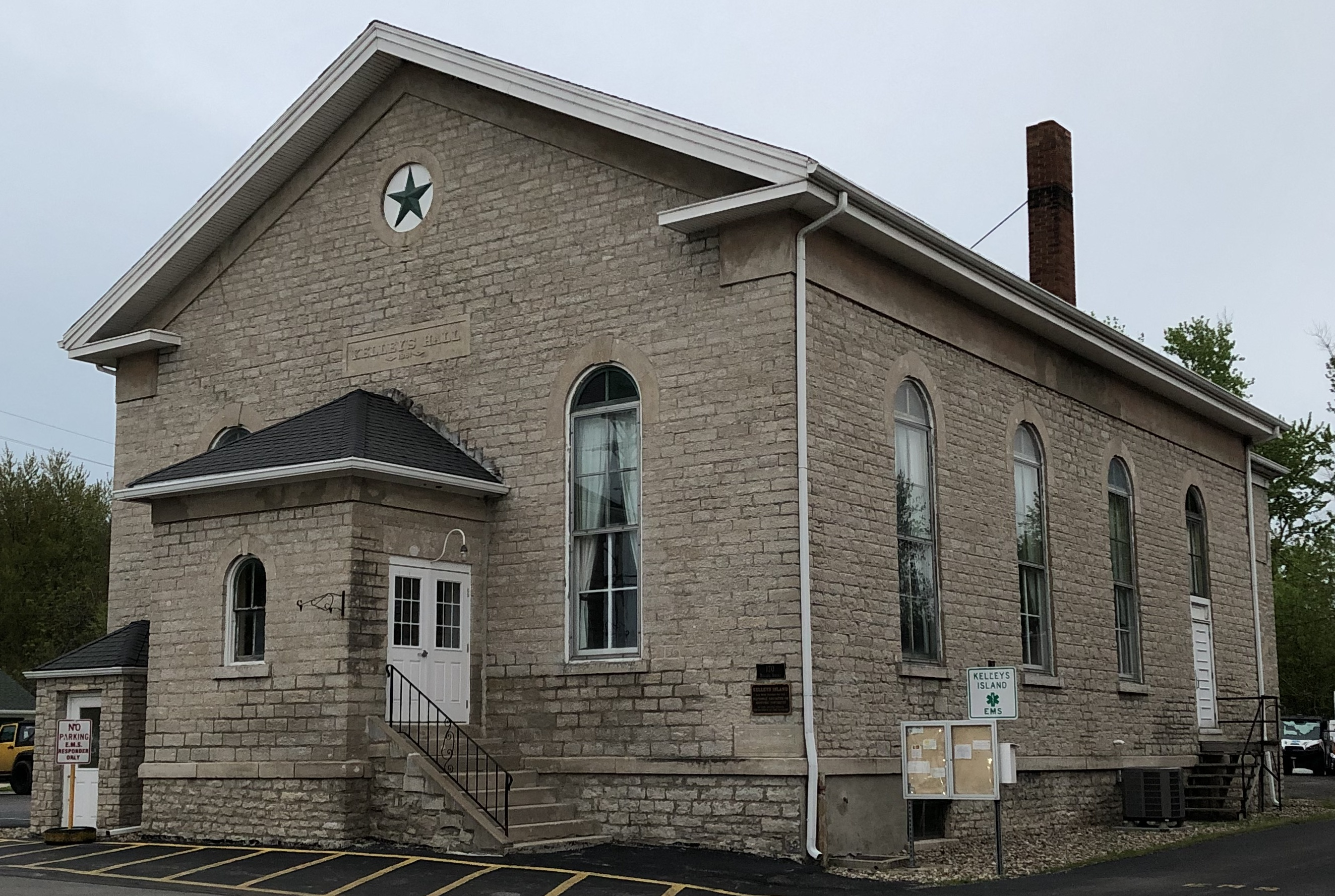
- Kelleys Island Village Hall
- Location: Water St. on the southern side of Kelleys Island (original); Entire island (increase)
- Coordinates: 41°35′41″N 82°42′35″W
- Area: 23 acres (9.3 ha) (original); 2,888 acres (1,169 ha)
- Architectural style: Italianate, Queen Anne, Gothic Revival
- NRHP reference No.: 75001380 (original); 88002734 (increase)
- Added to NRHP: March 27, 1975 (original); December 15, 1988

Kelleys Island is a village in Erie County, Ohio, located on the largest American island in Lake Erie. The community occupies the entire island, which covers about 4.41 square miles (11.4 km^{2}) and is known for its limestone and dolomite geology shaped by glacial activity. As of the 2020 census, the village has a population of 256 and functions primarily as a seasonal vacation destination. The island includes notable natural and historic features, including Inscription Rock and the Kelleys Island Historic District, which encompasses the entire island on the National Register of Historic Places.

== History ==
Kelleys Island was previously home to local Native Americans of the area. During the beginning of the War of 1812, the island was occupied by the British and later the US military who used it as a military rendezvous point. The British originally renamed it Sandusky Island. Later the United States occupied it officially designated it as Island Number 6 and Cunningham Island. During the early 19th century, the island was mostly uninhabited as the colonial forces displaced the original indigenous communities It was renamed as Kelleys Island in 1840 by brothers Datus and Irad Kelley, who had purchased nearly the entire island.

After the Kelley brothers purchased the land, there was commercial development through extraction of the island's limestone and lumber resources, and the population began to grow with workers and families. There was also growing of grapes as a commodity crop. As of the 2010 census, the island's population was 312.

Today, Kelleys Island is primarily a vacation destination, and is visited by thousands of people each summer. Notable attractions include its various beaches, parks, and campgrounds. Several ferries provide regular transport to the mainland for most travelers; the island also features a number of marinas, as well as a small airfield for private planes. It is the largest of the American Lake Erie Islands, and is a part of the Sandusky metropolitan area.

=== Native Americans and Inscription Rock ===
Kelleys Island is a Devonian limestone and dolomite ridge carved during the Pleistocene era. The first known occupants of Kelleys Island were Algonquian and Iroquoian, possibly including Erie, who travelled through the area to fish and at times lived in the area until 1656.

On the south shore of the island (near what is now the downtown-village area), there is a large limestone rock featuring petroglyphs carved over a number of years by these and earlier indigenous inhabitants. In the mid-19th century, scholar named it Inscription Rock. The Kelleys Island Historical Association relies on the Henry Rowe Schoolcraft investigations, which dated the carvings to roughly 1643. He theorized that the rock was used by members of "seasonal" Native American tribes, to impart information to one another about how the hunting had been in the area, and where their group would next be traveling.

Many different items and scenes are cut into the large flat top side of the rock, which measures 32 by 21 feet (9.8 m × 6.4 m). Over time, most of the inscriptions on this rock have been eroded away. The indigenous peoples who are thought to have inscribed these images are said to have been killed about 1665 by Iroquois nations from the New York area, who were trying to conquer territory to control the fur trade.

=== Early European settlers ===
This island is called Sandusky Island on maps produced in the latter half of the 18th century. (Prior to U.S. occupation of this area, the name "Cunningham's Island" seems to have been applied to present-day "Catawba Island", which was then also a true island.) In the late 1790s the Connecticut Land Company surveyed the south east shore of Lake Erie. A more thorough survey was completed in 1806, when this island was officially designated as "Island Number 6". Later the name Cunningham's Island was used to refer to the island.

There is a legend that the first European American resident of this island was a man named "Cunningham" (supposedly a "Frenchman" or French-speaking Canadian). He was said to have traveled to the island in 1803 with the intention of making his home there, at a time when it was still inhabited by Native Americans. For a while, Cunningham enjoyed what he perceived to be a friendlu relationship with the native people, though he did not have their permission to move there: he built a log cabin near their village, socialized with their hunters, and traded goods with them on a regular basis. But (as the legend goes) Cunningham had a disagreement with the Native Americans, and a group tore down his home, stole all his possessions, and attempted to kill him. He escaped to the Ohio Peninsula via canoe, but died shortly afterward from his wounds. For many years after his death, the island was known as Cunningham Island. [ However, the legend of Mr. Cunningham might instead apply to present-day Catawba Island, which seems to have been formerly named "Cunningham's Island" by the British, prior to 1804. Also note that the surname 'Cunningham' is not typically of French origin, but is recorded as of Scottish origin.] Prior to the War of 1812, several other white adventurers are documented as trying to settle this island, but all of them were eventually being driven away, either by the native people whose land it was, or by the incoming U.S. pioneers and land-owners. By the time the war had ended, the few remaining Native Americans had been displaced and forced to leave the island.

During the War of 1812, the west shore of Cunningham Island was developed as a military rendezvous post by US General William Henry Harrison. In 1818, a man named Killam briefly attempted to start a logging company, but abandoned the island after the large steam-powered boat he used to transport wood to the mainland wrecked and sank. Around 1826, people slowly began settling on the island; by 1830, six families made up its entire population.

About the year 1833, Ben Napier, a Scottish-American veteran of the War of 1812, claimed ownership of this "Cunningham Island" (and also nearby Put-in-Bay), through squatters rights. Napier and his associates often bullied the incoming pioneer settlers, sometimes hijacking their cabins and stealing or killing their livestock. Napier was eventually legally ousted after the court system ruled that he had no ownership rights. In April 1842, he was sentenced to five years in the penitentiary for making false claims of ownership while under oath. Napier was the father of both Nelson Napier, captain of the PS Alpena when she sank with no survivors in October 1880, and Joseph Napier, a Life-Saving Service station keeper.

=== Acquisition by the Kelleys ===
In 1830, John Clemons and his brother began mining the island's limestone, and opened its first quarry. They built a dock on the north side in order to ship the rock to the American mainland. Shortly afterward, brothers Datus and Irad Kelley became aware of the island's potential worth, and slowly began purchasing its land in parcels.

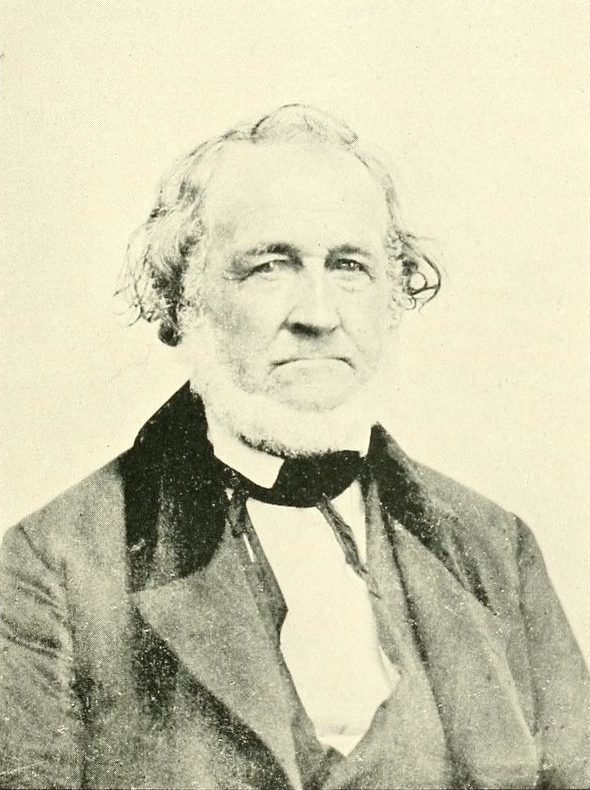
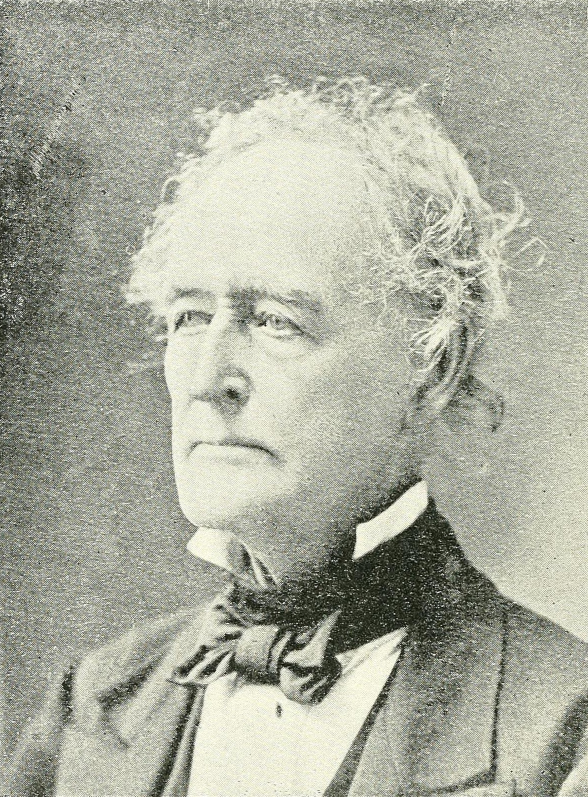
Brothers Datus and Irad Kelley

Datus and Irad Kelley were born in Middlefield, Connecticut, on April 24, 1788, and October 24, 1791, respectively. Datus moved to Rocky River, Ohio, in 1811, working as a surveyor and sawmill owner. Irad moved to Cleveland, Ohio, in 1812, eventually becoming a successful merchant, postmaster, sailor, and real-estate investor. Irad Kelley first became aware of the island after being forced to seek shelter there while transporting goods via sloop sailboat from Detroit to his shop in Cleveland. On August 20, 1833, the two began purchasing parcels of land on Cunningham Island at the rate of $1.50 per acre. They eventually owned the entire 3,000-acre (12 km^{2}) island, and in 1840 changed its name to Kelleys Island. By this time, the population had risen to 68 people.

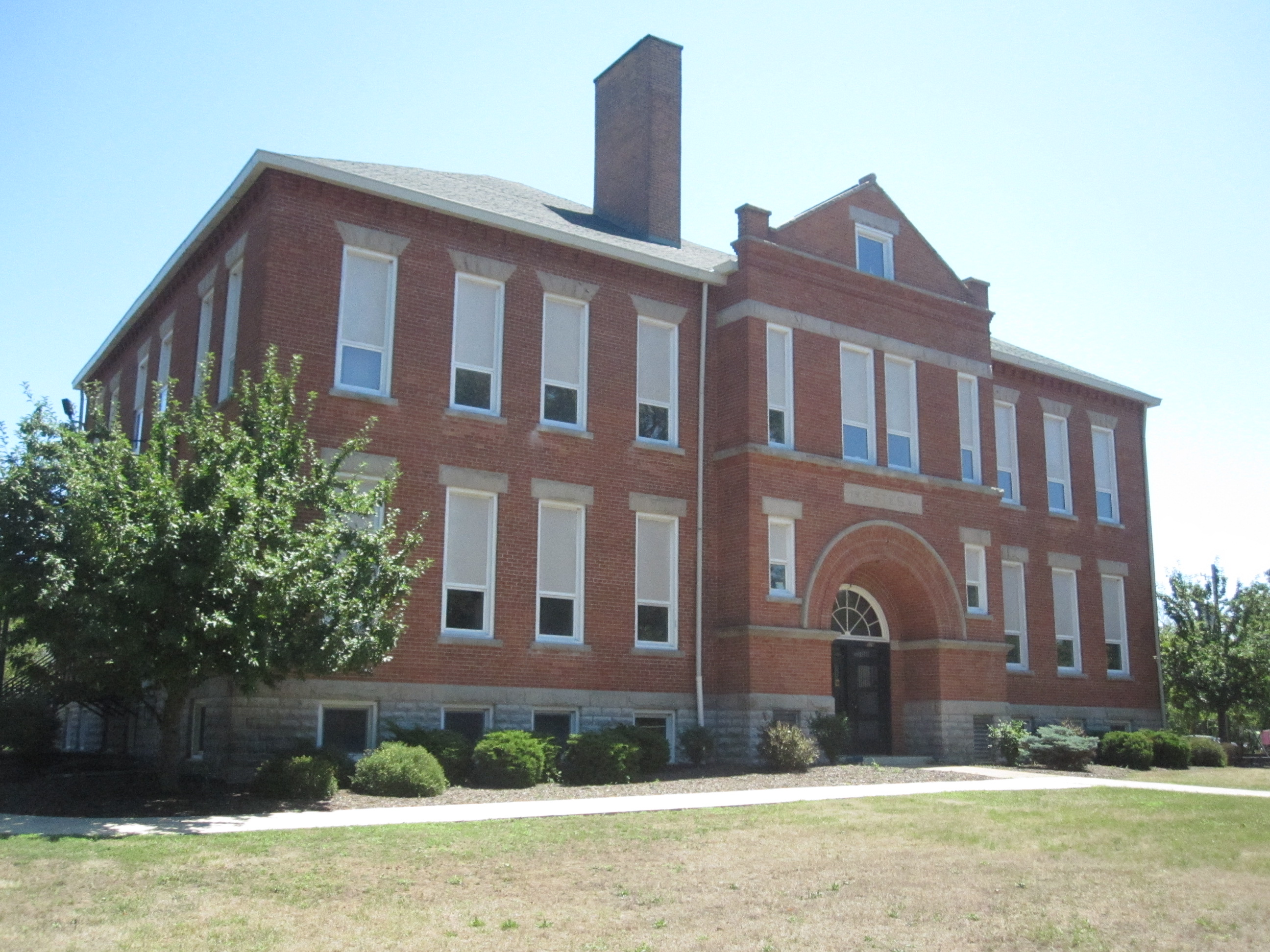
The Estes Schoolhouse on Kelleys Island

The brothers quickly began improving and expanding the island's docks to export limestone, fruit, and red cedar lumber. Soon, 16 limestone kilns were producing lime. The village's various industries hired a number of immigrants (including young children), many of whom would work on the island during the summer and return to their homeland during the winter. Among the nationalities working on the island at that time were Irish, Poles, Slavs, Macedonians, Hungarians, Bulgarians, Italians, and Portuguese. Datus Kelley encouraged sobriety, and he paid his employees bonuses for abstaining from "intoxifying liquors".

The quarries were the origin of the Kelley Island Lime & Transport Company, which was once the largest producer of limestone and lime products in the world, operating between 1896 and the early 1960s. Numerous ruins of these operations and quarries now dot the island.

In 1842, Charles Carpenter (son-in-law of Datus Kelley) of Norwich, Connecticut, began growing and harvesting grapes for wine on Kelleys Island. By the early 20th century, the island was annually producing 500,000 gallons of wine per year.

The small village grew quickly, and soon a library and post office were erected. In 1901, the Estes Schoolhouse was built at a cost of $15,000.

=== Recent history and modern day ===
Kelleys Island is heavily forested except for several residential areas, some for year-round residents, others for summer vacationers. Some small farms and a small limestone quarry still operate on the island. Each summer since 1974 (typically in August), the island hosts a weekend-long homecoming festival, which includes a theme parade featuring both locals and vacationers, a picnic, and a number of food and craft booths.

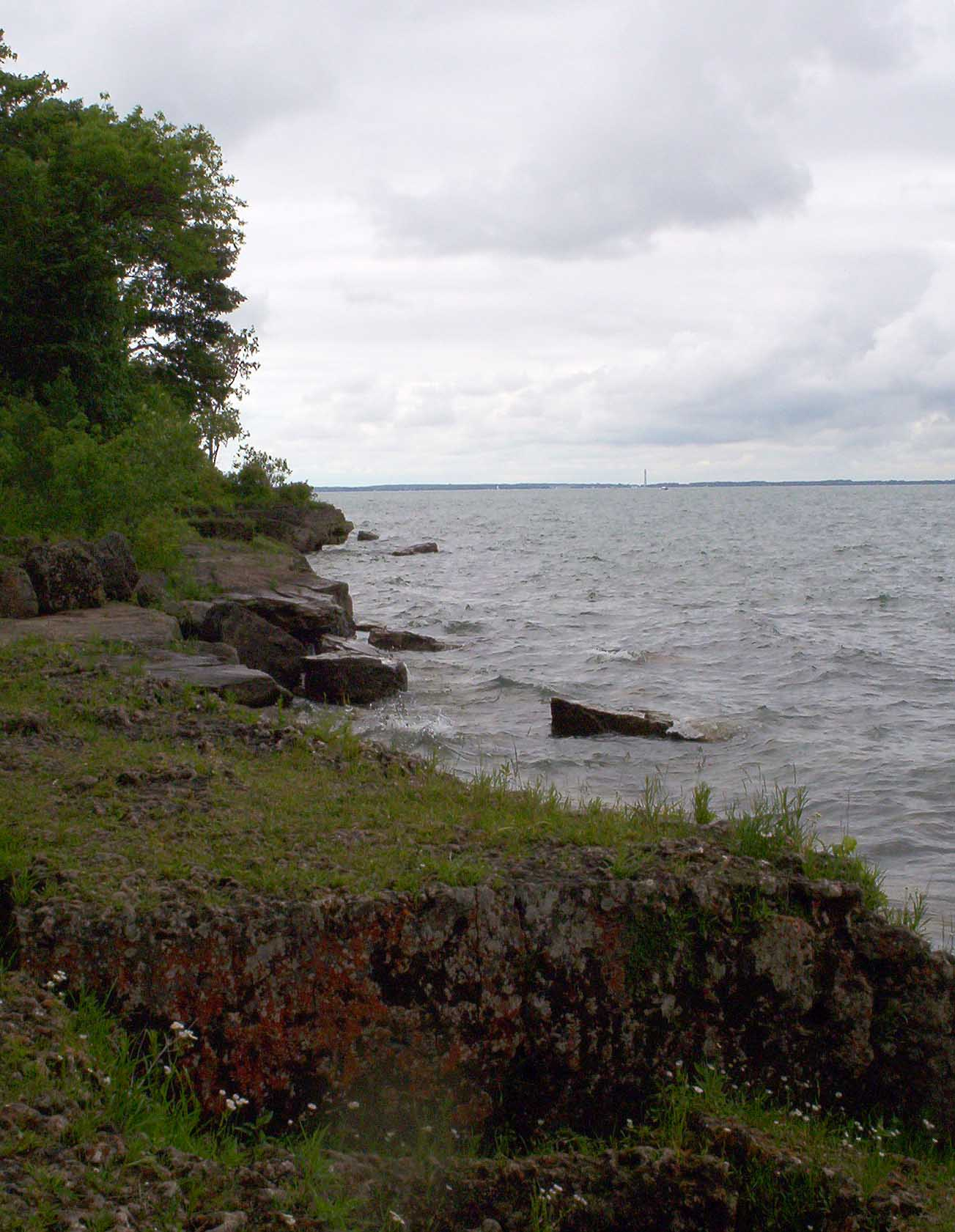
Alvar habitat on Kelleys Island. South Bass Island visible in distance.

Kelleys Island has a cemetery located on Division Street, about a mile north from the center of downtown. Although the cemetery is relatively small, several hundred people are buried or have memorial headstones there. Burials include that of Datus Kelley.

In 1975, 23 acres (9.3 ha) on the island's southern shore were designated as a historic district, the Kelleys Island South Shore District, and added to the National Register of Historic Places. In 1988, the district was renamed to the Kelleys Island Historic District and expanded to include the entire island.

Kelleys Island is one of 20 members of the Great Lakes Islands Alliance, which includes islands in the US and Canada. Other member islands include nearby Middle Bass, South Bass, and Pelee as well as Lake Michigan's Beaver and Washington Islands, Lake Ontario's Amherst, Howe, Simcoe, and Wolfe Islands, Lake Huron's Bois Blanc, Drummond, Les Cheneaux, Mackinac, Manitoulin, Neebish, St. Joseph, and Sugar Islands, Lake Superior's Madeline Island, and Lake St. Clair's Harsens Island.

== Tourism ==
Kelleys Island is primarily a vacation destination. It is one of only 17 islands in the Great Lakes that has a year-round population.

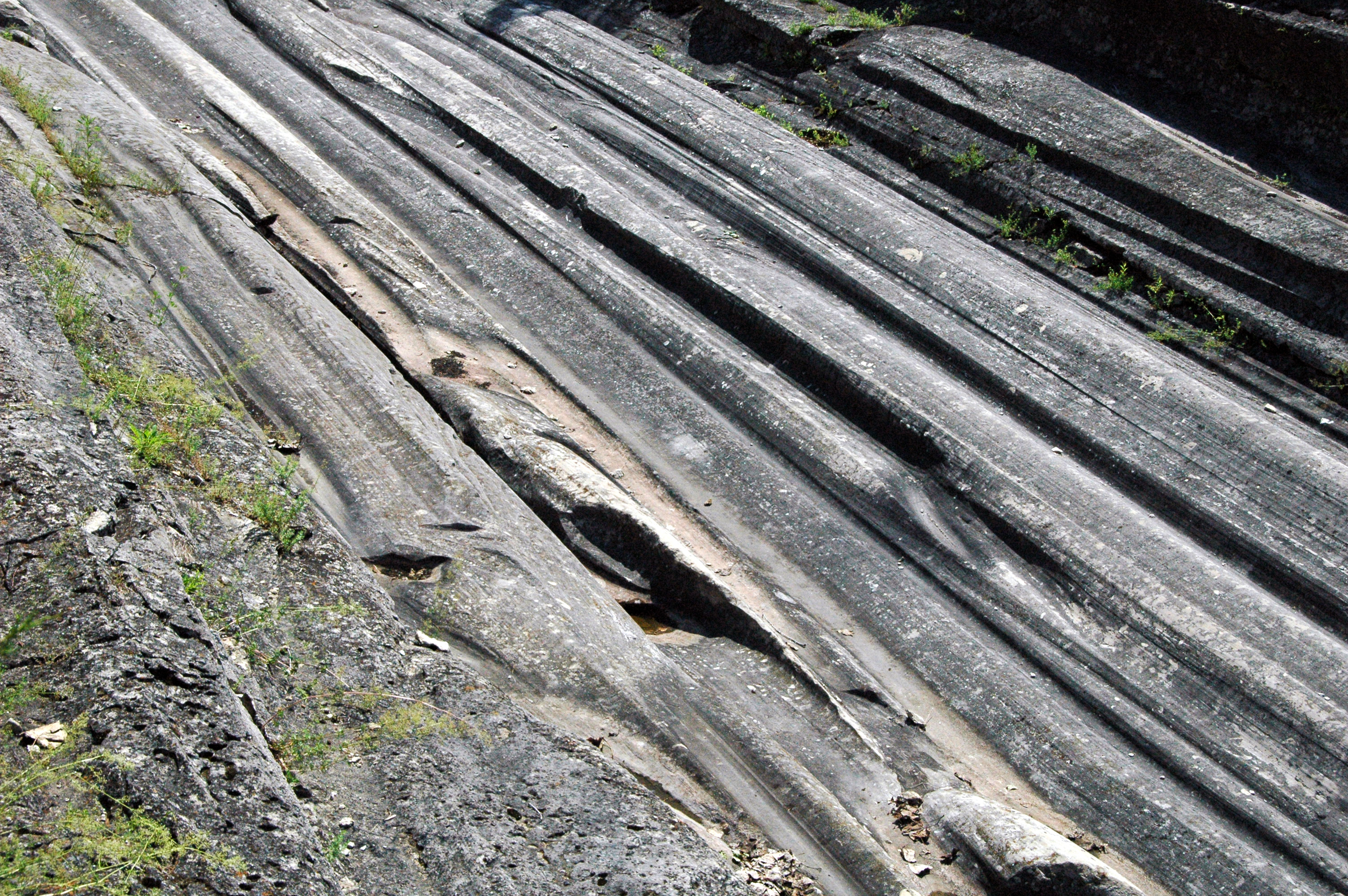
Glacial Grooves State Park, Kelleys Island. These glacial grooves were carved during the Pleistocene (the last Ice Age).

=== Beaches and wildlife ===
Kelleys Island features a number of public beaches. Many areas allow swimming, boating and fishing.

In August 2010, a report from The Nature Conservancy in conjunction with the US Fish and Wildlife Service U.S. Fish & Wildlife Service, the Ontario Ministry of Natural Resources, and several other non-profit agencies listed Kelleys as the 7th most ecologically threatened island in the Great Lakes. The reasons given for the island's poor ecological health included "development, tourism and recreation, marinas and resorts, increased roads and buildings, incompatible agricultural practices and invasive species."

=== Businesses ===
The most common types of establishments on Kelleys Island are pubs and restaurants, almost all of which have a summer season from May into September. The island also features a coffee shop, miniature golf course, several small general/convenience stores, and a large number of gift shops. No liquor is sold on the island outside of bars or restaurants, but several shops do sell beer and wine.

The island is also home to The Kelley's Island Wine Company, established in 1872 and at one time one of the nation's largest wineries. It stopped operation after two major fires eventually destroyed its facility during the Prohibition era. The 'ruins' of portions of the late-19th-century winery are still standing on the island. In 1982 the Zettler family re-established The Kelley's Island Wine at the site of one of the oldest stone cottages on the island, known as the Nicholas Smith house (built c. 1865).

=== Camps ===
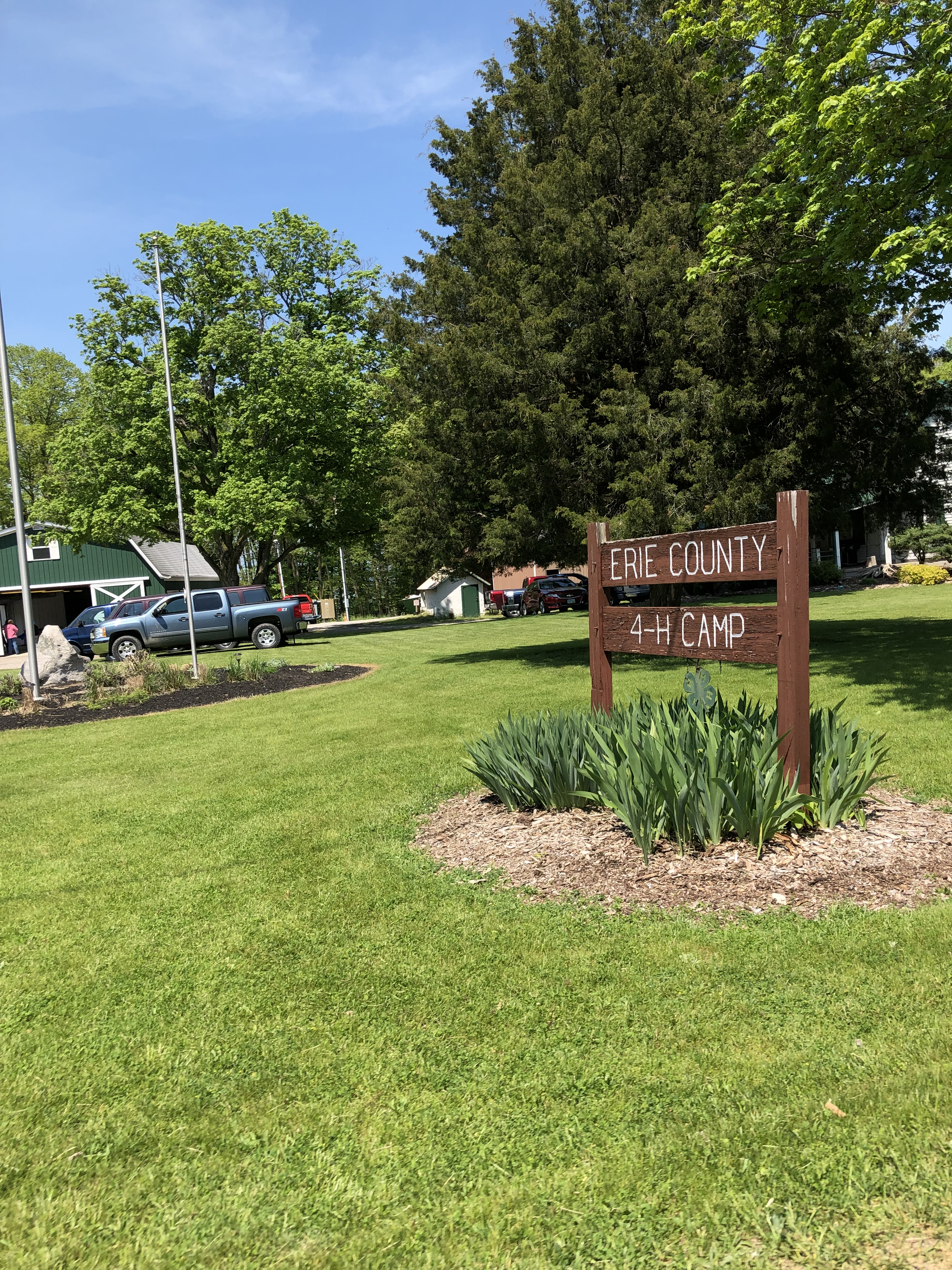
The Erie County 4-H camp.

Kelleys Island State Park contains a large campground.

Camp Patmos, a Christian youth camp, is located on the northeast side of the island. Camp Patmos was purchased in 1952 from Nativity B.V.M. Parish of Cleveland as the site of a faith-based summer camp for youth.

The Erie County 4H Camp is located on the north side of the island.

== Transportation ==
=== Ferries ===
The first ferry to regularly serve the island was the Neuman Ferry, founded in 1907 by John Paul Neuman. The boat originally provided transport from Lakeside, Ohio to what is now East Harbor State Park on Catawba Island (which is actually a peninsula). Eventually, he began service to the islands as well, including Kelleys. At its peak, the company operated a fleet of four ferries: the Commuter, the Corsair, the Kelleys Islander, usually running out of Marblehead; and the Challenger running out of Sandusky. The company folded in the first decade of the 21st century due to financial mismanagement, excessive growth with low market share, and steep price competition by the recently established Kelleys Island Ferry.

The Kelleys Island Ferry is the only line that runs year-round (weather permitting) between the island and the mainland. The line is owned by James "Jim" Palladino and his family. Palladino was tied by local media to the Cleveland Mafia. He was arrested in 1992 for being a felon in possession of over 60 firearms (it is illegal for an individual in Ohio to own any guns if previously convicted of a felony). After the Neuman Ferry line closed, Palladino had purchased several boats from the company, as well their dock on the island. The private ferry runs to Marblehead, Ohio every half-hour during the tourist season, with the ride lasting approximately 25 minutes.

The Jet Express provides high speed passenger ferry service that runs an island hopping route during the season (May to September) from the mainland port of Sandusky, Ohio to Cedar Point, Kelleys Island and Put-in-Bay. The Jet Express takes approximately 25 minutes from Sandusky.

=== Airport ===
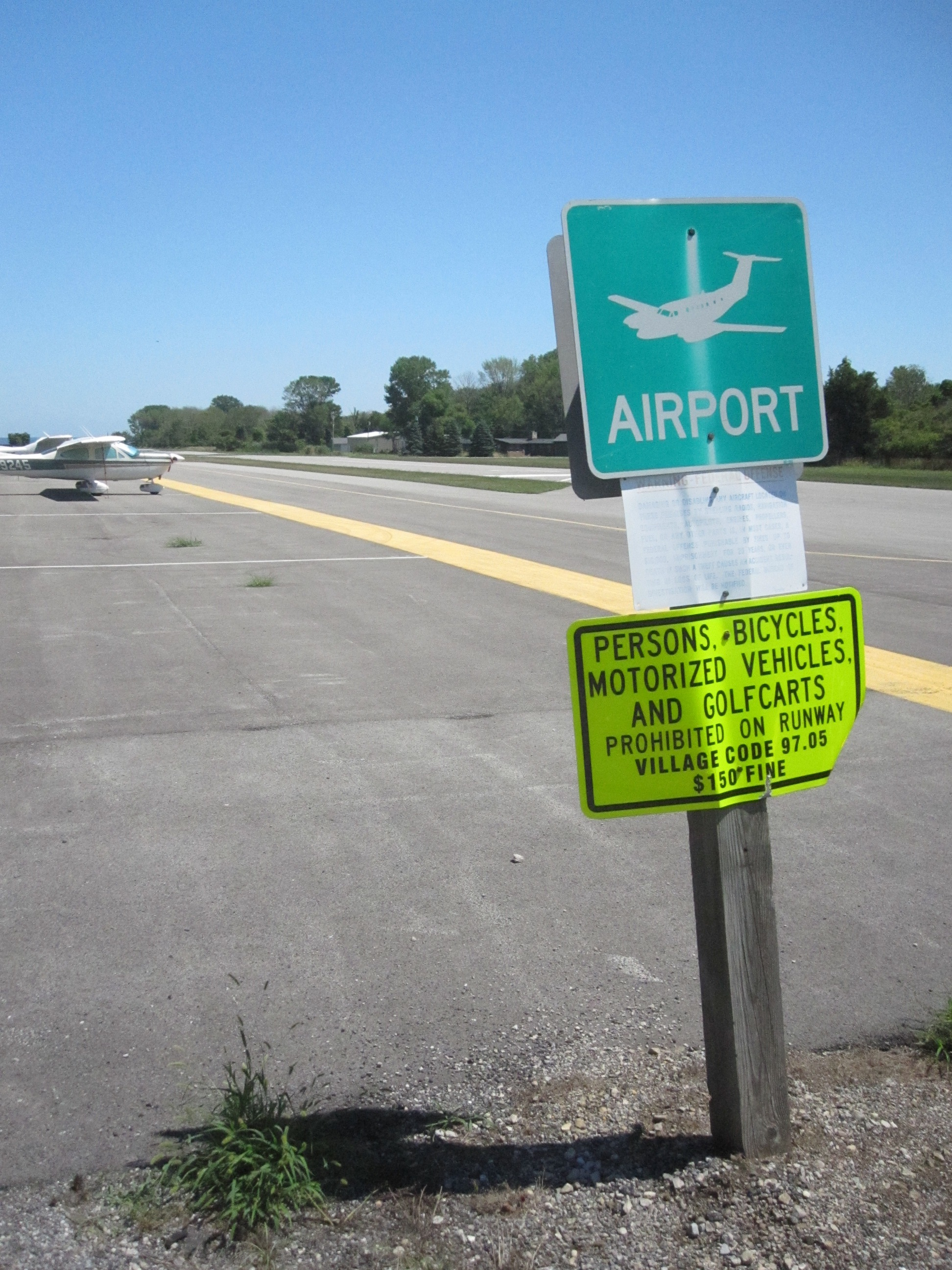
The single runway at Kelleys Island Land Field Airport

The east side contains a small public airport, called the Kelleys Island Land Field Airport (FAA LID: 89D). It features a terminal building, a single runway, and a parking area for airplanes.

=== Highways ===
Route of OH 575

Kelleys Island is served by Ohio State Route 575. The route was created in 1937 and has not changed since, and is one of Ohio's only state highways to be disconnected from the rest of the system.

=== Other ===
Due to the island's small size, many people use bicycles, golf carts and motor scooters as their regular transportation while there. Automobiles can be transported to the island via ferry; though most roads are modern, some streets on the north side as well as near the quarries are unpaved.

== Geography ==
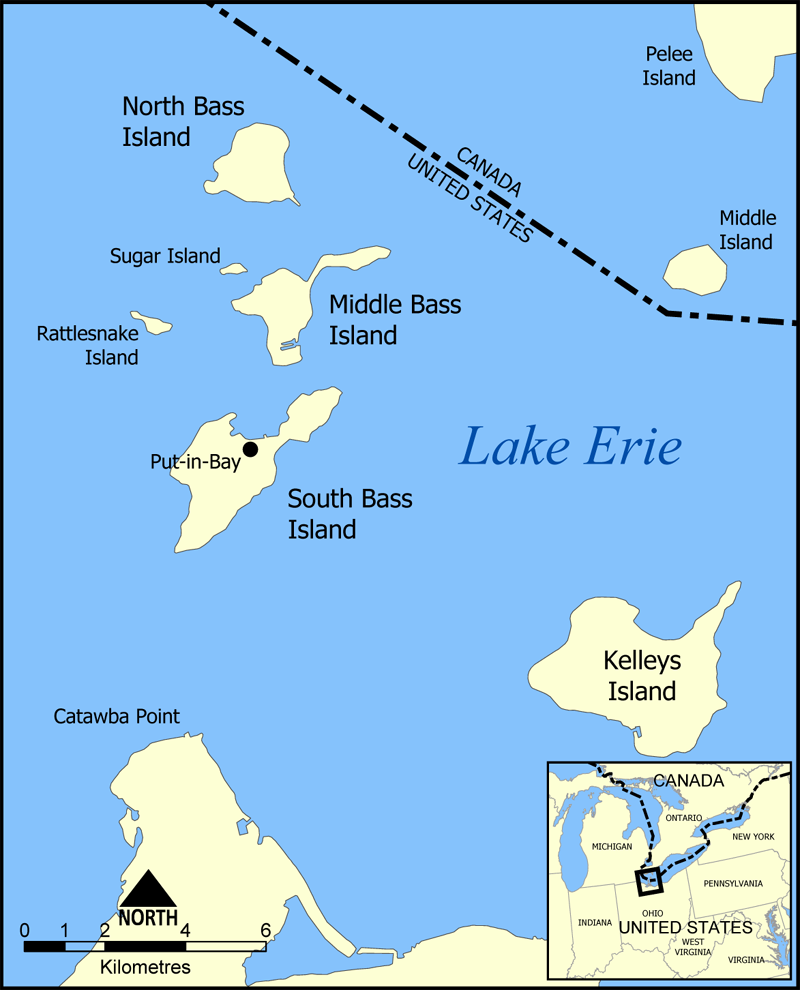
Map of Kelleys Islands and the nearby Bass Islands.

According to the United States Census Bureau, the village has a total area of 4.41 square miles (11.42 km^{2}), of which 4.35 square miles (11.27 km^{2}) is land and 0.06 square miles (0.16 km^{2}) is water.

=== Geology ===
Kelleys Island consists of Middle Devonian (Eifelian Stage) limestones and dolomites, the Lucas Dolostone, and the Columbus Limestone. The Lucas Dolostone is intensely dolomitized. With the exception of localized algal mounds and stromatoporoids, it is sparsely fossiliferous. Several species of stromatoporoids, which represent four genera, have been recorded from the Lucas Dolostone of Kelleys Island. The Lucas Dolostone accumulated within coastal subtidal to peritidal mudflats. These mudflats were permanently submerged and progressively buried beneath muddy shoal and lagoonal sediments as relative sea level rose and the shoreline shifted westward during the Eifelian Stage.

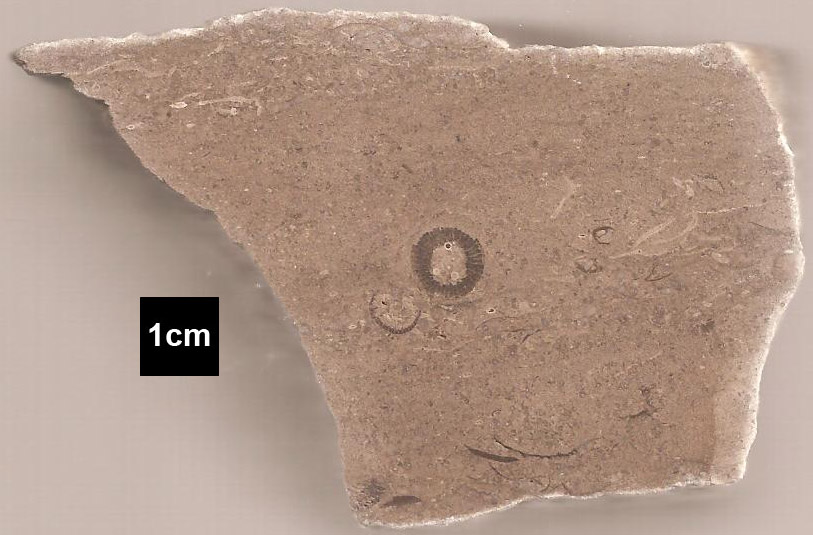
Etched section of hand sample of Columbus Limestone from quarry on Kelley's Island. Circular feature is cross section of a rugose coral.

Overlying the Lucas Dolostone, is the Columbus Limestone, which consists of the lowermost Bellepoint Member, middle Marblehead Member, and uppermost Venice Member. The Bellepoint Member consists of wackestones and packstones, which accumulated as muddy shoals and contain a large number of rugose corals, gastropods, rostroconchs, and brachiopods. The Marblehead Member consists of a lower, thick-bedded, cherty, dolomitic, heavily burrowed mudstone deposited in lagoonal conditions below mean wave base. These mudstones grade upward into thinner bedded, sparsely fossiliferous packstones and grainstones of this member's upper part that accumulated as subtidal shoals. A rippled, hardground surface forms the top of the Marblehead Member This hardground represents either a period of subaerial erosion or the lack of sediment accumulation at a shallow depth for a significant interval of time. The Marblehead Member is overlain by mudstones and wackestones of the uppermost Venice Member of the Columbus Limestone. This member accumulated below wave base in the open sea after relative sea level rose again.

The Devonian limestone and dolomite that comprise Kelleys Island has been deeply eroded and scoured by the Laurentide Ice Sheet over the Pleistocene. On the island, the largest exposure of glacial grooves and striations created by glacial erosion is preserved in Glacial Grooves State Memorial, which is associated with Kelleys Island State Park. Within the Memorial, giant glacial grooves in a depression about 9 meters (30 ft) wide and 4.5 meters (15 ft) deep are exposed in an outcrop about 120 meters (390 ft) long. Near the east edge of the outcrop, a number of the grooves are relatively straight, smooth, and exhibit striated surfaces. Farther west, the path of the individual grooves becomes far more tortuous, and striations are less distinct and fewer in number.

Munro-Stasiuk and others argue that the giant glacial grooves and the depression, in which they lie, were eroded by highly turbulent, high velocity, sediment-laden meltwater flows. Judging from similar tortuous, giant, glacial grooves, which are found all over, and between, the Lake Erie islands on high and low areas, the erosional features are interpreted to have formed during a subglacial meltwater megaflood that took place before or near the Last Glacial Maximum.

== Demographics ==
Historical population
Census	Pop.	Note	%±
1900	1,174		—
1910	1,017		−13.4%
1920	708		−30.4%
1930	638		−9.9%
1940	564		−11.6%
1950	324		−42.6%
1960	171		−47.2%
1970	175		2.3%
1980	121		−30.9%
1990	172		42.1%
2000	367		113.4%
2010	312		−15.0%
2020	256		−17.9%
U.S. Decennial Census

=== 2020 census ===
The 2020 census showed a population of 289 with a median age of 65.9, in 149 households.

=== 2010 census ===
As of the census of 2010, there were 312 people, 175 households, and 99 families residing in the village. The population density was 71.7 inhabitants per square mile (27.7/km^{2}). There were 859 housing units at an average density of 197.5 per square mile (76.3/km^{2}). The racial makeup of the village was 98.1% White, 0.3% African American, 0.6% Asian, 0.6% from other races, and 0.3% from two or more races. Hispanic or Latino of any race were 1.3% of the population.

There were 175 households, of which 10.9% had children under the age of 18 living with them, 52.6% were married couples living together, 1.7% had a female householder with no husband present, 2.3% had a male householder with no wife present, and 43.4% were non-families. 41.1% of all households were made up of individuals, and 19.4% had someone living alone who was 65 years of age or older. The average household size was 1.78 and the average family size was 2.34.

The median age in the village was 58.8 years. 9.6% of residents were under the age of 18; 1.3% were between the ages of 18 and 24; 11.2% were from 25 to 44; 43.6% were from 45 to 64; and 34.3% were 65 years of age or older. The gender makeup of the village was 52.6% male and 47.4% female.

=== 2000 census ===
Largest ancestries (2000)	Percent
German (Germany)	28.0%
English (England)	15.9%
Irish (Republic of Ireland)	15.3%
Polish (Poland)	8.9%
Italian (Italy)	6.1%

As of the census of 2000, there were 367 people, 183 households, and 112 families residing in the village. The population density was 80.5 inhabitants per square mile (31.1/km^{2}). There were 709 housing units at an average density of 155.5 per square mile (60.0/km^{2}). The racial makeup of the village was 99.46% White, 0.27% African American, 0.27% from other races. Hispanic or Latino of any race were 0.27% of the population.

There were 183 households, out of which 15.8% had children under the age of 18 living with them, 53.6% were married couples living together, 5.5% had a female householder with no husband present, and 38.3% were non-families. 35.5% of all households were made up of individuals, and 15.3% had someone living alone who was 65 years of age or older. The average household size was 1.99 and the average family size was 2.55.

In the village, the population was spread out, with 15.0% under the age of 18, 2.2% from 18 to 24, 19.9% from 25 to 44, 40.1% from 45 to 64, and 22.9% who were 65 years of age or older. The median age was 52 years. For every 100 females, there were 100.5 males. For every 100 females age 18 and over, there were 102.6 males.

The median income for a household in the village was $35,500, and the median income for a family was $49,375. Males had a median income of $29,643 versus $26,071 for females. The per capita income for the village was $21,944. About 7.6% of families and 9.8% of the population were below the poverty line, including none of those under age 18 and 14.0% of those age 65 or over.

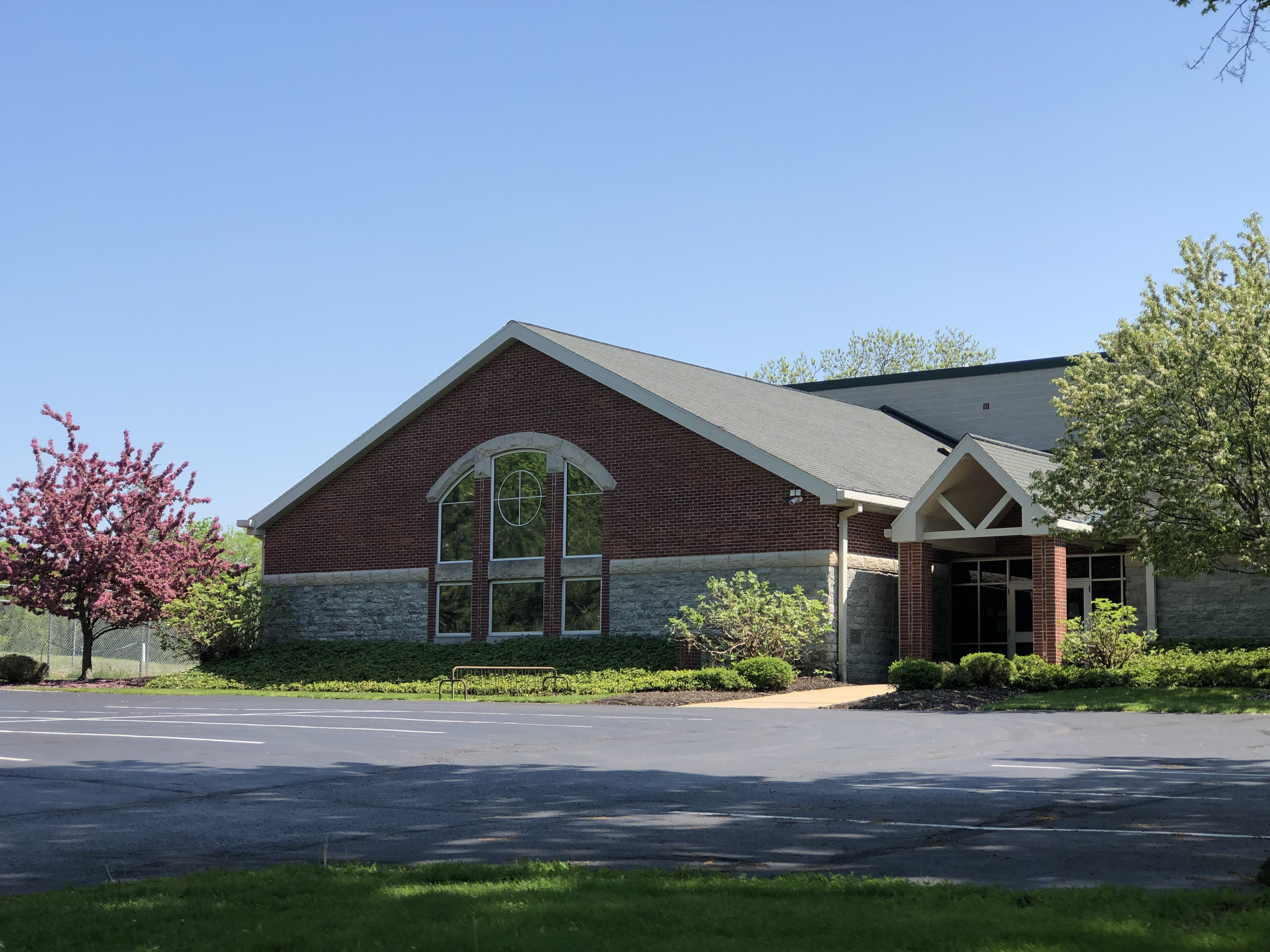
The library is located in an annex of the school.

=== Education ===
Kelleys Island School serves the island and is located on Division Street. The village has a public library, a branch of the Sandusky Library system.

== See also ==
- Populated islands of the Great Lakes

== Notes ==
a: The actual area of the expanded district is 2,888 acres (1,169 ha), which is mathematically equivalent to the island's area 4.6 square miles (12 km^{2}).
