= Marblehead, Ohio =

- Village
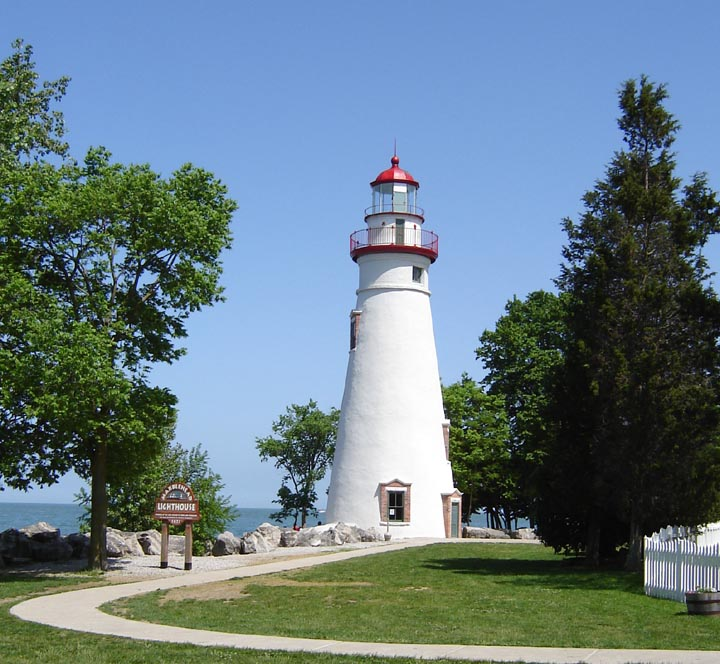
- Marblehead Lighthouse

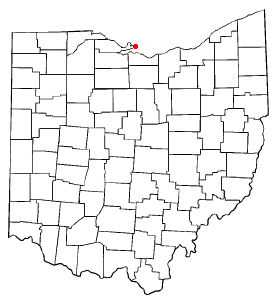
- Location of Marblehead, Ohio

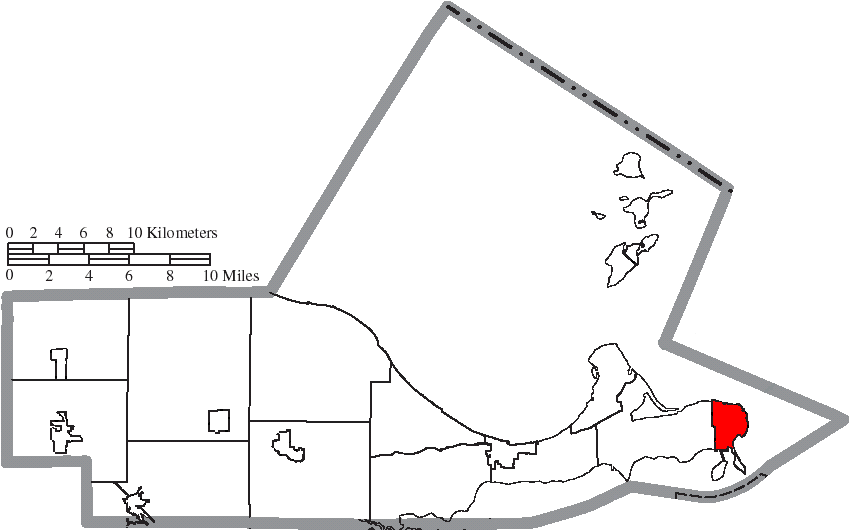
- Location of Marblehead in Ottawa County
- Coordinates: 41°30′30″N 82°43′42″W
- Country: United States
- State: Ohio
- County: Ottawa
- Township: Danbury

Area
  - Total: 4.16 sq mi (10.77 km^{2})
  - Land: 3.17 sq mi (8.21 km^{2})
  - Water: 0.99 sq mi (2.56 km^{2})
- Elevation: 594 ft (181 m)

Population (2020)
  - Total: 865
  - Density: 272.9/sq mi (105.35/km^{2})
- Time zone: UTC-5 (Eastern (EST))
  - Summer (DST): UTC-4 (EDT)
- ZIP code: 43440
- Area code: 419
- FIPS code: 39-47502
- GNIS feature ID: 2399252
- Website: www.marbleheadohio.org

Marblehead is a village in Ottawa County, Ohio, United States. The population was 865 at the 2020 census. It sits at the tip of the Marblehead Peninsula, which divides Lake Erie proper from Sandusky Bay. Marblehead is part of the area that is referred to regionally as Vacationland (which includes nearby Sandusky and the Lake Erie Islands) due to the large number of tourists who flock to the area in the summer months. It remains a popular vacation destination due to its lake frontage, ferry service to the Lake Erie Islands, quality sport fishery, the nearby Lakeside Chautauqua, and the Cedar Point amusement park. Marblehead is also home to the Lakeside Daisy State Nature Preserve, home to the only natural U.S. population of the Lakeside Daisy, an endangered species.

Marblehead is home to the Marblehead Lighthouse, the oldest continuously-operating lighthouse on the American side of the Great Lakes. The lighthouse is a part of the Marblehead Lighthouse State Park located within the village. Marblehead is also home to a United States Coast Guard station. Nearby, in Sandusky Bay, is Johnson's Island, a former Confederate officer prisoner of war camp during the Civil War.

Marblehead is also commercially important as a major limestone producer. The limestone is mined in nearby quarries and transported by conveyor belt to the Marblehead loading dock, where it is loaded on commercial lake freighters. The blocks of stone used to construct the Stannard Rock Light on Lake Superior were cut at Marblehead and hauled to the site from 1877 to 1881.

== Geography ==
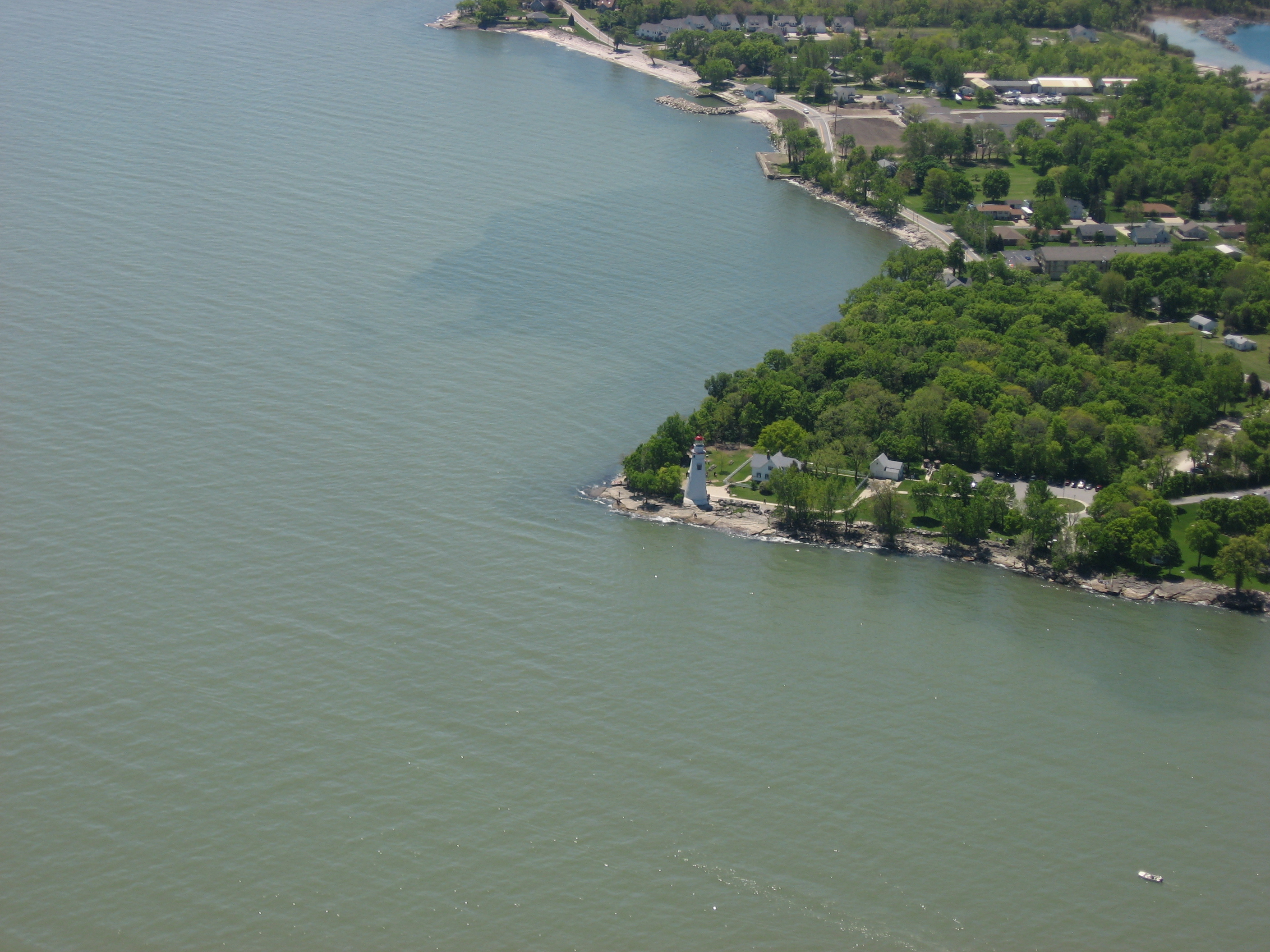
Aerial view of the Marblehead Lighthouse and surrounding parts of the village

According to the United States Census Bureau, the village has a total area of 4.31 square miles (11.16 km^{2}), of which 3.31 square miles (8.57 km^{2}) is land and 1.00 square mile (2.59 km^{2}) is water.

=== Climate ===
Marblehead, as with much of the Great Lakes region, has a humid continental climate (Köppen Dfa), characterized by four distinct seasons. Lake Erie moderates the climate, especially in late spring and fall, when air and water temperature differences are maximal. Fall temperatures tend to be warmer than the inland areas, while spring temperatures tend to be cooler than inland areas. However, this effect is lessened in the winter because Lake Erie (unlike the other Great Lakes) usually freezes over, coupled with prevailing winds that are often westerly.

The warmest month of the year is July, with an average temperature of 73.2 °F (22.9 °C). January has the lowest average temperature of the year of 24.6 °F (-4.1 °C). The driest month is February, with 1.7 inches (44 mm) of precipitation. With an average of 3.7 inches (94 mm), the most precipitation falls in June.

Climate data for Marblehead, Ohio [Historical Weather Data (1982-2012)]
Month	Jan	Feb	Mar	Apr	May	Jun	Jul	Aug	Sep	Oct	Nov	Dec	Year
Mean daily maximum °F	31.8	34.2	43.9	56.3	67.8	78.1	82.4	80.8	74.1	62.4	48.9	36.7	58.1
Daily mean °F	24.6	26.6	36.0	47.5	58.6	68.9	73.2	71.8	64.8	53.2	41.7	30.2	49.8
Mean daily minimum °F	17.6	19.0	28.0	38.7	49.6	59.7	64.2	62.8	55.6	44.2	34.5	23.9	41.5
Average precipitation inches	1.9	1.7	2.6	3.1	3.3	3.7	3.5	3.5	3.1	2.2	2.8	2.6	34
Mean daily maximum °C	−0.1	1.2	6.6	13.5	19.9	25.6	28	27.1	23.4	16.9	9.4	2.6	14.5
Daily mean °C	−4.1	−3.0	2.2	8.6	14.8	20.5	22.9	22.1	18.2	11.8	5.4	−1.0	9.9
Mean daily minimum °C	−8.0	−7.2	−2.2	3.7	9.8	15.4	17.9	17.1	13.1	6.8	1.4	−4.5	5.3
Average precipitation mm	49	44	66	79	85	94	89	88	78	56	72	66	866

== Demographics ==
Historical population
Census	Pop.	Note	%±
1900	997		—
1910	1,172		17.6%
1920	1,048		−10.6%
1930	1,027		−2.0%
1940	915		−10.9%
1950	867		−5.2%
1960	858		−1.0%
1970	726		−15.4%
1980	679		−6.5%
1990	745		9.7%
2000	762		2.3%
2010	903		18.5%
2020	865		−4.2%
U.S. Decennial Census

=== 2010 census ===
As of the census of 2010, there were 903 people, 417 households, and 285 families living in the village. The population density was 272.8 inhabitants per square mile (105.3/km^{2}). There were 942 housing units at an average density of 284.6 per square mile (109.9/km^{2}). The racial makeup of the village was 98.7% White, 0.2% African American, 0.1% Native American, 0.3% Asian, 0.1% from other races, and 0.6% from two or more races. Hispanic or Latino of any race were 1.7% of the population.

There were 417 households, of which 18.0% had children under the age of 18 living with them, 60.2% were married couples living together, 4.6% had a female householder with no husband present, 3.6% had a male householder with no wife present, and 31.7% were non-families. 28.3% of all households were made up of individuals, and 15.8% had someone living alone who was 65 years of age or older. The average household size was 2.17 and the average family size was 2.57.

The median age in the village was 55.7 years. 15.9% of residents were under the age of 18; 4.6% were between the ages of 18 and 24; 13.5% were from 25 to 44; 37.3% were from 45 to 64; and 28.8% were 65 years of age or older. The gender makeup of the village was 49.7% male and 50.3% female.

=== 2000 census ===
As of the census of 2000, there were 762 people, 332 households, and 239 families living in the village. The population density was 268.9 inhabitants per square mile (103.8/km^{2}). There were 973 housing units at an average density of 343.3 per square mile (132.5/km^{2}). The racial makeup of the village was 97.90% White, 0.26% African American, 0.26% Native American, 0.26% Asian, 0.66% from other races, and 0.66% from two or more races. Hispanic or Latino of any race were 1.44% of the population.

There were 332 households, out of which 18.4% had children under the age of 18 living with them, 62.3% were married couples living together, 6.9% had a female householder with no husband present, and 28.0% were non-families. 25.3% of all households were made up of individuals, and 14.8% had someone living alone who was 65 years of age or older. The average household size was 2.26 and the average family size was 2.68.

In the village, the population was spread out, with 16.9% under the age of 18, 6.6% from 18 to 24, 19.3% from 25 to 44, 32.3% from 45 to 64, and 24.9% who were 65 years of age or older. The median age was 49 years. For every 100 females there were 96.9 males. For every 100 females age 18 and over, there were 97.8 males.

The median income for a household in the village was $46,528, and the median income for a family was $52,250. Males had a median income of $39,688 versus $24,545 for females. The per capita income for the village was $26,184. About 3.0% of families and 4.7% of the population were below the poverty line, including 3.2% of those under age 18 and 5.2% of those age 65 or over.

== Economy ==
Marblehead's economy benefits from its lakefront situation, with its fishing, boating, and recreational tourism industries providing employment opportunities for many locals. Marblehead and surrounding attractions in Ottawa and Erie County are collectively known to visitors as "Vacationland," or more recently, Lake Erie's "Shores and Islands." The regional tourist economy is anchored by attractions like Cedar Point, Put-in-Bay, and Kelleys Island. Marblehead is the primary mainland port of the Kelleys Island Ferry Boat Line, the main passenger and vehicle ferry to Kelleys Island. Nearby Lakeside Chautauqua and Bay Point Resort serve as lakefront destinations as well. Marblehead contains many summer and second homes that residents of nearby Toledo, Cleveland, and Columbus visit during the tourist season.

Quarrying is also a large part of Marblehead's economy as it is a major limestone producer in the region. Lafarge Quarry, located in the interior of the peninsula, mines and transports quarries via the Marblehead loading dock.

== Education ==
Marblehead, in addition to neighboring Danbury Township, is served by the Danbury Local School District. It operates one elementary school (Danbury Elementary), one middle school (Danbury Middle), and one high school (Danbury High).

Marblehead also contains the Marblehead Peninsula Branch of the Ida Rupp Public Library System.

== Media ==
Marblehead is part of the Sandusky/Lake Erie Islands radio market and is included as part of the Toledo TV market.

Marblehead is served by radio by WPCR - PortClintonRadio.com, "Ottawa County's News, Sports, and Weather Authority." This internet exclusive radio station carries live local sporting events, weather, and fishing reports as well as locally produced programs.

Marblehead is served in print by The Beacon and the Port Clinton News-Herald, which serve Ottawa County. The village is also covered by the Sandusky Register, which is the region's largest newspaper.

== See also ==
- Lakeside and Marblehead Railroad
- Loretta Clemens Tupper
- Marblehead Lighthouse State Park
