= Lakeside Association Police Department =

The Lakeside Association Police Department is a special security police formed at the beginning of the twentieth century to patrol and provide security for the private association and Chautauqua community of Lakeside, Ohio, United States. The two patrolman employed were invested with full police powers under the Ohio Revised Code 311.29(c)(d), 505.43.2, and were given authority to enforce Chautauqua rules and regulations. In the 1950s the police force was dissolved and police protection was then the responsibility of the Ottawa County Sheriff's Office. A special division for Lakeside was formed for the Sheriff's Deputies assigned to the community. This division was later called the Lakeside Association Police Department. The department was headed by a Chief Deputy, and staffed by two Sheriff's Deputies and two non-sworn personnel employed by the Association who were titled Lakeside Security Guards.

== Community Duties ==
Lakeside Police were responsible for patrolling the Association streets and property bordering Marblehead and Danbury Township, Ohio, and they were also called at times to assist local police departments in Marblehead Danbury Township. The non-sworn personnel or Lakeside Security Guards performed most of the community building checks, patrols, and other non-law enforcement duties for the Association. Also community parades were escorted by both Lakeside Security and Lakeside Police. In 1989 the department was the first in the area to use computers and the software DataManagerPC for police report writing. This gave the department a tech-edge till 1995. After changes in the department in 1998 the computer system was again reinstituted till 2000.

== Lakeside Police History and Its Presence Today ==
The Lakeside Association Police Department was dissolved in 1994 due to personnel issues, along with the State of Ohio removing police powers and arrest authorities from "Chautauquas" throughout Ohio, citied in the Ohio Revised Code. The Ottawa County Sheriff's Office deputies that were assigned to the Lakeside Police Department after the change became "Lakeside Security Officers/Special Deputies". The Ottawa County Sheriff's Office continued to patrol the community but it was under contract by providing one deputy through 1995. After 1998, The Lakeside Association continued to provide their own protection by forming the Lakeside Security Department along with the Danbury Township Police, due to the association property being with the township jurisdiction, and the Ottawa County Sheriff's Office. The former Lakeside Police, radios, computers, and misc. equipment was soon utilized by the department. Early in 1998, the department (which was based on the outskirts of the grounds in the "municipal services building") had two patrol cars, and several officers patrolling, this was done by cruisers, foot, or on bicycle. Although most of the officers were civilians in stature having with no arrest power, the department hired several officers, having peace officer status, with arrest powers certification from the Ohio Peace Officer Training Commission (OPOTC). Some of the officers at the time were also cross trained as emergency medical technicians (EMT's) and/or firefighters, given greater safety coverage for the residents and visitors. This was the most and diverse staff ever employed at once in the history of the Department. As the economy changed so did the Lakeside Security Department and no longer holds the traditions of the past. The patrols cars have left in the years afterwards, thus shortly after so did the traditional uniform. Currently the department has downsized, the patrols are done primarily in golf carts, and a marked patrol pick-up with no overhead warning lights. The uniform has become polo shirts, and shorts (summer), and slacks (winter).

== Police Heads ==
- 1955 - 1984 Deputy Frank Thompson (Chief Deputy Lakeside Police Department)
- 1984 - 1994 Deputy Robert Bailey (Chief Deputy Lakeside Police Department)
- 1994 - 1996 Chief Robert Bailey (Chief of Security Lakeside Security Department)
- 1996 - 2005 Chief Nick Crawford (Chief of Security Lakeside Security Department)

== 1994 Police Department Listing ==
- Chief Deputy Robert Bailey
- Deputy Marty Matthes
- Deputy Lanny Taylor
- Deputy Daniel Cuevas (Part-Time, Fill-In Position)
- Officer Tim Woodruff
- Officer Charles Frost

== 1998 Security/Police Department Listing ==
- Chief Nick Crawford
- Officer Marvin Rothenbuhler
- Officer David Koran (Association Police Officer), Certified OPOTC Officer
- Officer Chic Suavey
- Officer Lynn Clemons
- Officer Sean Michael Smith/O'Malley (Association Police Officer), Certified OPOTC Officer/Instructor, EMT/Firefighter
- Officer Jim Hiekes
