= Ohio State Route 579 =

East–west state highway in northwestern Ohio, US

State Route 579

Route information
- Maintained by ODOT
- Length: 10.76 mi (17.32 km)
- Existed: 1937–present

Major junctions
- West end: SR 51 near Northwood
- East end: SR 2 near Williston

Location
- Country: United States
- State: Ohio
- Counties: Wood, Ottawa

Highway system
- Ohio State Highway System; Interstate; US; State; Scenic
← SR 578	→ SR 580

State Route 579 (SR 579) is an east–west state highway in northwestern Ohio, a U.S. state. The western terminus of SR 579 is at SR 51 just south of the city limits of Northwood. Its eastern terminus is at a T-intersection with SR 2 approximately four miles (6.4 km) to the east of Williston.

== Route description ==
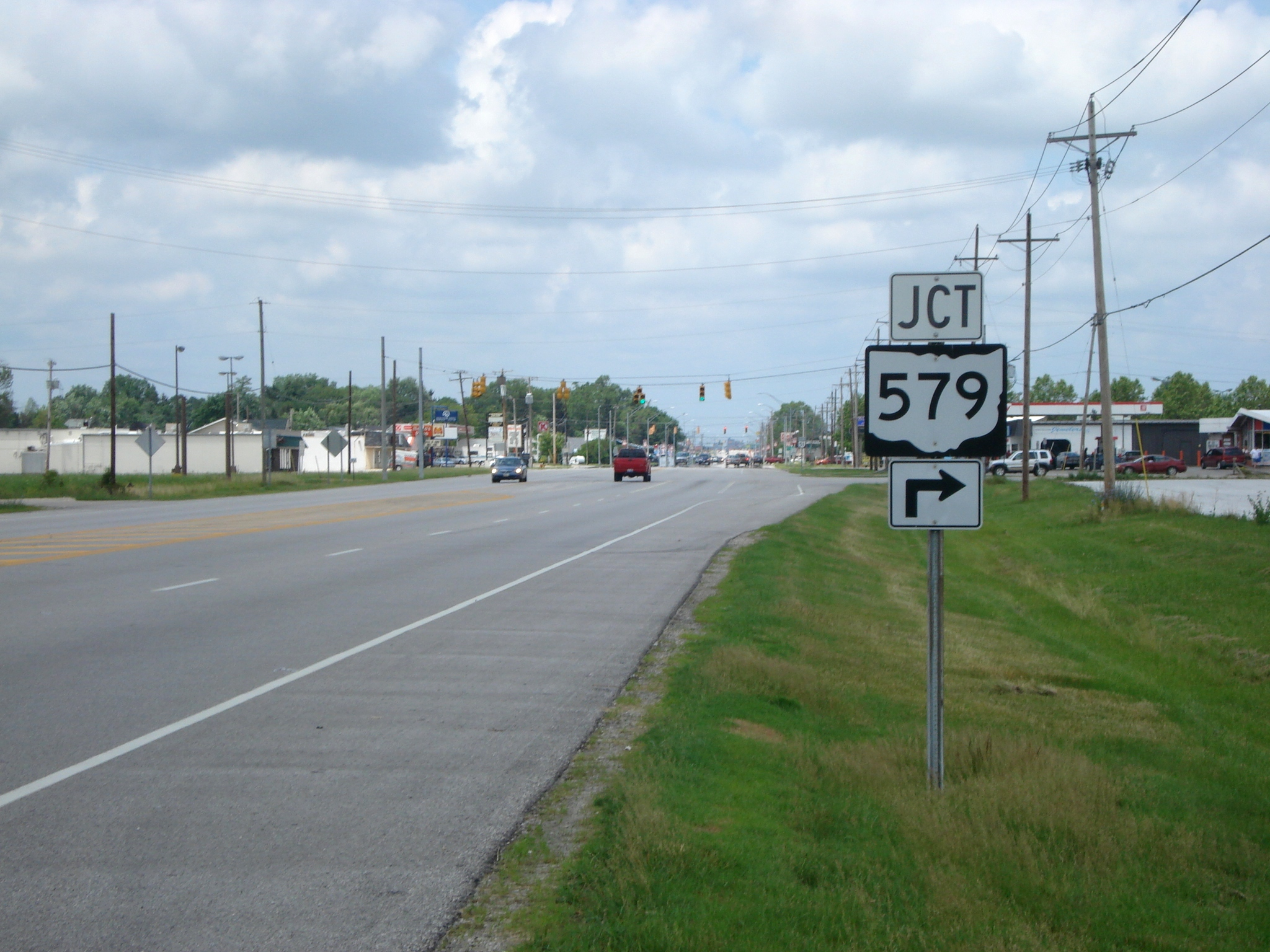
Junction signage for SR 579 on SR 51 northbound in advance of SR 579's western terminus.

SR 579 travels through Wood and Ottawa counties along its way. The highway is not a part of the National Highway System.

A signalized intersection with SR 51 in Lake Township just south of Northwood marks the starting point of SR 579. The route starts out in a northeasterly direction, but as it sweeps by the southeast corner of the former Woodville Mall, it turns due east, as it lines itself up with the boundary between Lake Township and the City of Northwood. SR 579, which starts out briefly as a five-lane road, quickly narrows down to two lanes, and enters into a more rural setting. Passing by a mix of generally flat open space and subdivisions, SR 579 intersects Bradner Road and Millbury Road on the way to its intersection with Fostoria Road, which marks the boundary between Wood and Ottawa Counties.

Once it enters into Ottawa County's Allen Township, SR 579 continues on an easterly path, traversing numerous fields and passing by the occasional house. After Billman Road, SR 579 abuts the north side of the Chippewa Golf Club. East of there, the highway has split intersections with Reiman Road and Genoa-Clay Center Road. Past Genoa-Clay Center Road, SR 579 enters into the unincorporated community of Williston, where the state route is primarily a residential street. Following a split intersection with Martin-Williston Road and a railroad crossing, it treks back into rural territory. The landscape remains both flat and consistent, with a mix of open fields and houses as State Route 579 has a split intersection with Opfer-Lentz Road, then goes on to meet Nissen Road.

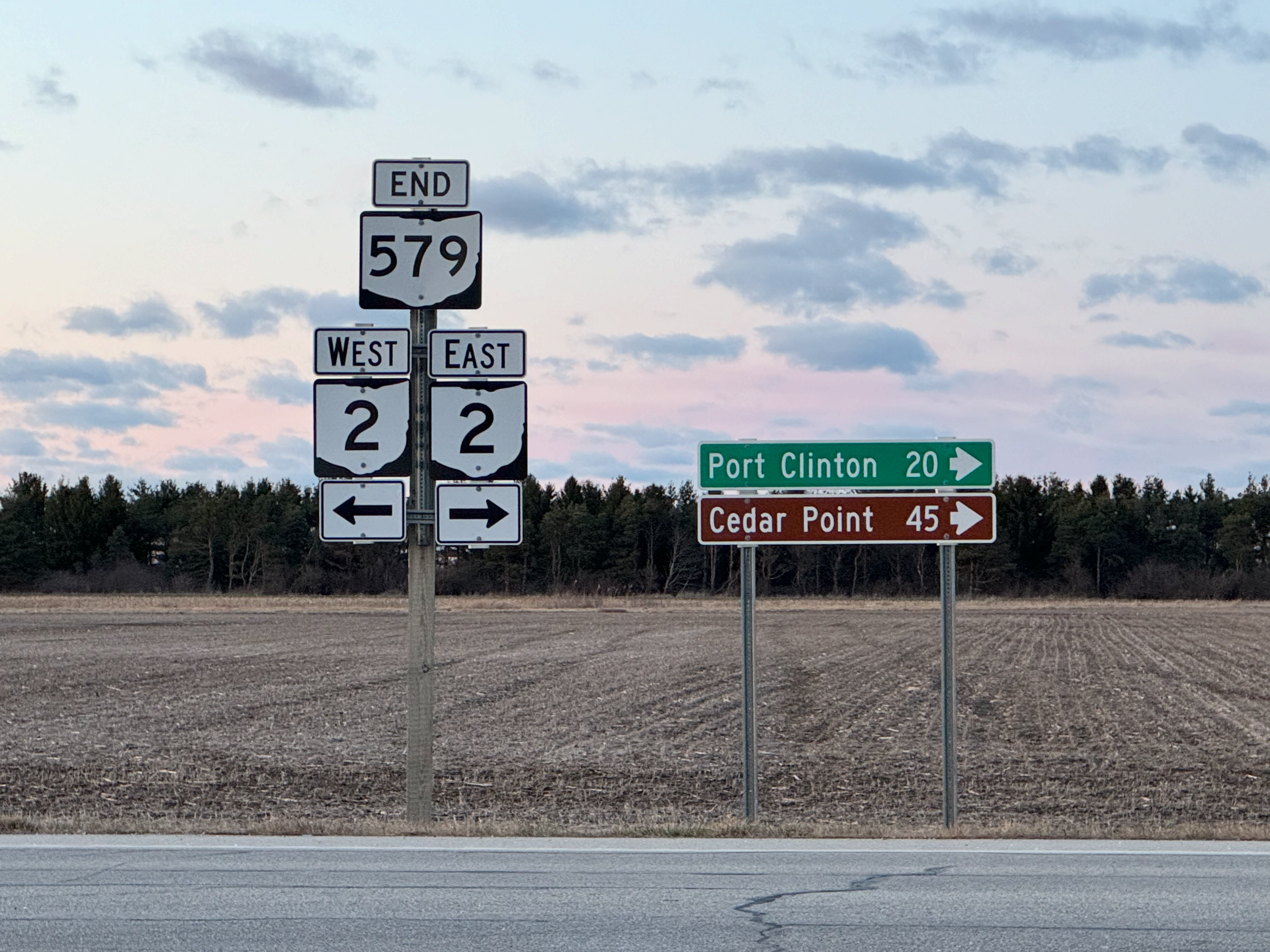
Signage at eastern terminus of SR 579

Following the Nissen Road intersection, where SR 579 enters into Benton Township, the highway has split intersections with Elliston-Trowbridge Road and Graytown Road. Just east of Graytown Road, SR 579 bends slightly to the south, then back to the north, to come into the T-intersection with SR 2 that serves as its eastern terminus.

== History ==
SR 579 was first designated in 1937 along its current alignment. No major changes have taken place to SR 579 since its inception.

== Major intersections ==
County	Location	mi	km	Destinations	Notes
Wood	Lake Township	0.00	0.00	SR 51 (Woodville Road)	
Ottawa	Benton Township	10.76	17.32	SR 2 / LECT – Port Clinton	
1.000 mi = 1.609 km; 1.000 km = 0.621 mi
