= Put-in-Bay Airport =

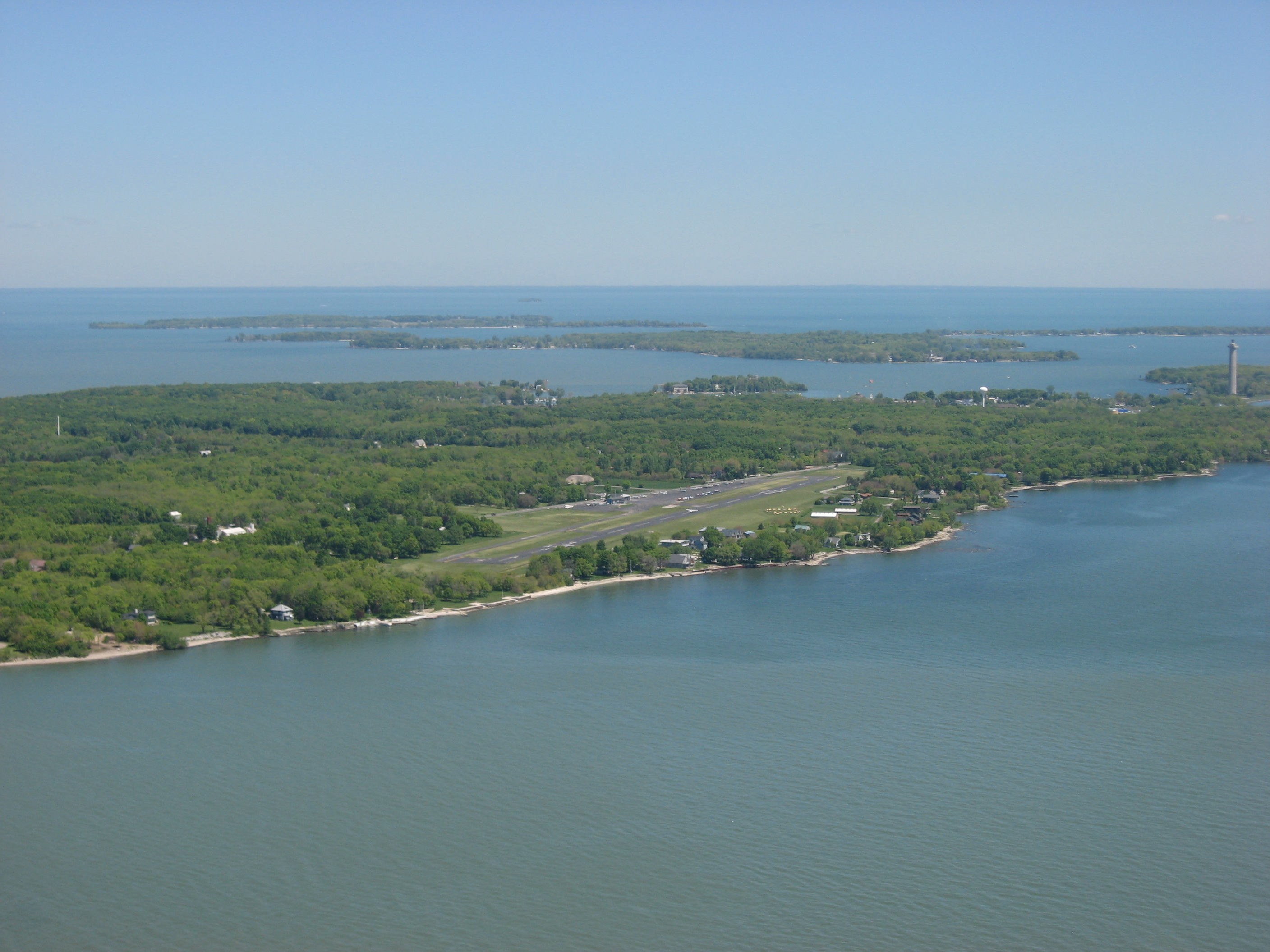
- Entering the approach pattern at Put-in-Bay Airport
- IATA: none; ICAO: none; FAA LID: 3W2

Summary
- Airport type: Public
- Operator: Put-in-Bay Township Port Authority
- Serves: South Bass Island-Put-in-Bay
- Location: South Bass Island-Put-in-Bay
- Time zone: UTC−05:00 (-5)
  - Summer (DST): UTC−04:00 (-4)
- Elevation AMSL: 595 ft (181 m)
- Coordinates: 41°38′12″N 82°49′42″W

Map
- Location of airport in Ohio 3W2 (the United States)

Runways
Direction	Length		Surface
Direction	ft	m	Surface
3/21	2,870	875	Asphalt

Statistics (2021)
- Aircraft Operations: 14,965
- Based Aircraft: 11

Put-in-Bay Airport (FAA LID: 3W2) is a public airport located in Put-in-Bay on South Bass Island in Ottawa County, Ohio, United States. The approach to Runway 21 is complicated by Perry's Victory and International Peace Memorial, which is almost exactly in line with the runway; pilots are asked to respect special procedures to avoid the monument. The airport is located in the center of the southern half of the island.

Put-in-Bay's airport is open year-round for arrivals and departures from dawn to dusk. Runways at the Put-in-Bay airport are paved but not lighted, so there are no departures after dusk.

There is no fuel service at the Put-in-Bay airport, but fuel may be purchased at Erie–Ottawa International Airport in Port Clinton. The Put-in-Bay airport provides charter services, refreshments (vending), and rest rooms.

The airport is mainly used to bring mail to the island as well as to bring passengers nearby islands and mainland Ohio. It is also home to three air tour operators who provide recreational trips from the airport.

The airport received a $22,000 grant in 2021 to provide economic relief funds for costs related to operations, personnel, cleaning, sanitization, janitorial services, debt service payments, and combating the spread of pathogens.

== Airlines and destinations ==
Airlines	Destinations
Griffing Flying Service	Charter: Port Clinton, Ohio, Kelleys Island, Ohio Middle Bass Island, Ohio, North Bass Island, Ohio Pelee Island, Ontario
Island Air Taxi	Port Clinton, Ohio

== Facilities and aircraft ==
The airport has one runway, designated as Runway 3/21. It measures 2870 x 75 ft (875 x 23 m) and is paved with asphalt.

In 2014, the airport received over $500,000 to reconstruct its main taxiway and build an additional taxiway to access hangars.

The airport received nearly $2 million from the Bipartisan Infrastructure and Jobs Act in 2023 to build a new terminal with a public area, a baggage room, a mechanical room, and restrooms. The new terminal will replace a 55-year-old building currently in use. Construction on the new terminal could begin in October 2024.

For the 12-month period ending October 1, 2021, the airport had 14,965 aircraft operations, an average of 41 per day. It included 52% general aviation and 48% air taxi. For the same time period, 11 aircraft are based at the airport: 10 single-engine airplanes and 1 helicopter.

== Accidents and incidents ==
- On December 29, 1937, a plane crashed 1/2 mile from the airport while flying low in fog.
- On August 19, 1984, a Piper PA-28 Cherokee crashed while executing a go-around at the Put in Bay Airport. The pilot attempted the go-around because he saw another aircraft still on the runway. Witnesses reported the aircraft made a sharp right turn during the go around with the wings 90 degrees to the horizon. The aircraft subsequently impacted the water.
- On January 20, 2003, a Cessna 207A Skywagon was substantially damaged during a forced landing after a loss of engine power during departure from Put in Bay Airport. The pilot stated that the engine start, taxi, run-up, and takeoff were uneventful. However, shortly after departing runway 03, about 300 feet above the ground, the engine lost all power. After the power loss, the pilot activated the electric fuel pump and moved the fuel selector several times. He then heard the stall warning horn and performed a forced landing into trees. The pilot further stated that both fuel gauges indicated "1/4" full and that he probably departed with the fuel selector positioned to the right tank but could not be certain. The pilot also noted that after the power loss, with the electric fuel pump operating, the fuel flow gauge did not indicate any flow. The probable cause of the accident was found to be the pilot's inadequate fuel management, which resulted in fuel starvation and a total loss of engine power during the initial climb.
- On July 10, 2004, a Griffing Flying Service aircraft experienced a bird strike after departing Put in Bay for Middle Bass Island. The pilot was bloodied in the incident and received medical attention upon landing at Middle Bass.
- On April 21, 2014, a Piper PA-28 Cherokee collided with a goose while landing at Put in Bay Airport. The aircraft landed uneventfully.
- On June 15, 2014, a Cessna 182 Skylane was damaged while landing at the Put in Bay Airport. The pilot reported that his first traffic pattern downwind leg was too close to the runway, so he departed the pattern and re-entered for a more stable approach. On the second landing, the airplane flared too high, landed hard and bounced twice before the pilot executed a go-around. The pilot then conducted a normal landing. Examination of the airplane revealed substantial damage to the firewall and damage to the propeller tips. The probable cause of the accident was found to be the pilot's improper flare, which resulted in a hard landing.

== See also ==
- List of airports in Ohio
