= Kelleys Island Land Field =

Public use airport on Kelleys Island, Ohio

- IATA: none; ICAO: none; FAA LID: 89D

Summary
- Owner/Operator: Village of Kelleys Island
- Serves: Kelleys Island, Ohio
- Location: Kelleys Island, Ohio
- Time zone: UTC−05:00 (-5)
  - Summer (DST): UTC−04:00 (-4)
- Elevation AMSL: 598 ft (182 m)
- Coordinates: 41°36′12″N 82°41′06″W

Map
- Location of airport in Ohio 89D (the United States)

Runways
Direction	Length		Surface
Direction	ft	m	Surface
09/27	2,202	671	Asphalt

Statistics (2021)
- Aircraft movements: 25,550

The Kelleys Island Land Field airport (FAA LID: 89D) is a publicly owned, public use airport located on Kelleys Island, Ohio, United States.

The airport serves many tourists visiting Kelleys Island State Park. Griffing Flying Service offers charter flights to and from the airport.

== Facilities and aircraft ==
The airport has one runway, designated as runway 9/27. It measures 2202 × 50 ft (671 × 15 m) and is paved with asphalt.

In September 2019, the airport received over $100,000 to improve its drainage system. In August 2021, the airport received $360,000 to perform an environmental assessment. In September 2022, the airport received nearly $500,000 to reconstruct runway lighting. It received a further $113,000 in 2023.

For the 12-month period ending September 27, 2021, the airport had 25,550 aircraft operations, an average of 70 per day. This included 66% general aviation and 34% air taxi. For the same time period, there were two aircraft based at the airport, both single-engine airplanes.

== Airlines and destinations ==
Airlines	Destinations	Refs
Griffing Flying Service	Charter: Port Clinton, Ohio, Middle Bass Island, Ohio, North Bass Island, Ohio, Put-in-Bay, Ohio, Pelee Island, Ontario	

== Accidents and incidents ==
- On July 31, 1954, a Ford Tri-Motor lost control and crashed while taking off from Kelleys Island Land Field airport.
- On 2 February 1962, a Cessna 172 crashed while attempting to land at the airport, killing the pilot and two passengers.
- On September 3, 2007, a Cessna 172 Skyhawk crashed after departure from Kelleys Island Field Airport. Officials say the aircraft veered off the runway while taking off and went into Lake Erie. The aircraft was found submerged in 20 feet of water less than 1,000' from the departure end of the runway, and only one of three people on board survived.
