= Martin Welles =

American politician (1787–1863)

Personal details
- Born: December 7, 1787 Wethersfield, Connecticut, U.S.
- Died: January 19, 1863 (aged 75) Martin, Ohio, U.S.
- Resting place: Newington, Connecticut, U.S.
- Party: Whig
- Spouse: Fanny Norton
- Children: 4
- Education: Yale College
- Occupation: Politician; lawyer; judge

Martin Welles (December 7, 1787 – January 19, 1863) was an American politician and lawyer from Connecticut.

== Early life ==
Martin Welles was born on December 7, 1787, in Wethersfield, Connecticut, to Jemima (née Kellogg) and General Roger Welles. He graduated from Yale College in 1806. He studied law with Samuel Cowles of Farmington.

== Career ==
Welles opened an office in Farmington. He was later admitted to the bar in New York. He then practiced law in Newburgh, New York, and later in New York City.

Welles returned to Wethersfield. He planned and was the superintendent of the Connecticut State Prison. He was criticized by Captain Pillsbury on the food and management of the state prison.

Welles was a Whig. He served in the Connecticut House of Representatives from 1824 to 1827. He served as the clerk of the body during that time. He served in the Connecticut Senate from 1827 to 1829. He served again in the House of Representatives from 1831 to 1832. He was speaker of the house during this period.

Welles was a member of the corporation of Yale College in the 1820s. He was associate judge on the Hartford County Court. He then practiced law in Hartford the remainder of his life.

== Personal life ==
Welles married Fanny Norton, daughter of Reuben S. Norton, of Farmington. He had four sons. He died on January 19, 1863, in Martin, Ohio. He was buried in Newington.
