= Forest Park, Ottawa County, Ohio =

Forest Park, Ohio
- Unincorporated community
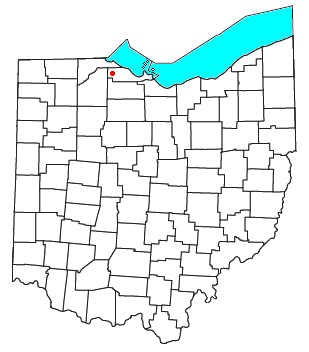
- Location of Forest Park, Ohio
- Coordinates: 41°32′41″N 83°22′44″W
- Country: United States
- State: Ohio
- County: Ottawa
- Township: Clay
- Elevation: 623 ft (190 m)
- Time zone: UTC-5 (Eastern (EST))
  - Summer (DST): UTC-4 (EDT)
- GNIS feature ID: 1040569

Forest Park is an unincorporated community in northwestern Clay Township, Ottawa County, Ohio, United States. It lies at the intersection of Hellwig and Reiman Roads with State Route 51, Gray and Kennard Roads, less than 2 miles (about 3 km) northwest of Genoa and a similar distance southwest of Clay Center. The headwaters of the South Fork of Turtle Creek, which empties into Lake Erie to the east, are located south of Forest Park, and both parts of the South Fork flow past the community.
