= Middle Bass Island Airport =

- IATA: none; ICAO: none; FAA LID: 3T7

Summary
- Airport type: Public
- Owner: Put-in-Bay Township Port Authority
- Serves: Middle Bass Island
- Location: Middle Bass Island, Ohio
- Built: 2000
- Time zone: UTC−05:00 (-5)
  - Summer (DST): UTC−04:00 (-4)
- Elevation AMSL: 579 ft (176 m)
- Coordinates: 41.68866°N 82.80863°W

Map
- Location of airport in Ohio 3T7 (the United States)

Runways
Direction	Length		Surface
Direction	ft	m	Surface
10/28	1,852	564	Asphalt

Statistics (2021)
- Aircraft operations: 6,500
- Source: Federal Aviation Administration

Middle Bass Island Airport (FAA LID: 3T7) is a public airport located on Middle Bass Island in Ottawa County, Ohio, United States. It is owned by the Put-in-Bay Township Port Authority.

== History ==
The airport opened in the early 2000s but was faced with years of construction delays before becoming operational. The airport is considered a vital lifeline for island residents, who use airplanes to access mainland Ohio as well as surrounding islands.

The airport received a $22,000 grant in 2021 to provide economic relief funds for costs related to operations, personnel, cleaning, sanitization, janitorial services, debt service payments, and combating the spread of pathogens.

== Airlines and destinations ==
Airlines	Destinations	Refs
Griffing Flying Service	Charter: Port Clinton, Ohio, Kelleys Island, Ohio North Bass Island, Ohio, Put-in-Bay, Ohio, Pelee Island, Ontario	

== Facilities and aircraft ==
=== Facilities ===
Middle Bass Island Airport has one asphalt paved runway (10/28) measuring 1,852 x 75 ft. (564 x 23 m).

The airport does not have a fixed-base operator, nor does it have any fuel available.

In 2021, $3 million were allocated to upgrade facilities both at Middle Bass Island and South Bass Island. Middle Bass Island received funds to rehabilitate a general aviation apron, its runway, and a taxiway.

The airport got another $100,000 in funding in 2023.

=== Aircraft ===
For the 12-month period ending August 27, 2021, the airport had 6,500 aircraft operations, an average of 125 per week: 62% air taxi and 39% general aviation. For the same time period, four aircraft were based at the airport, all single-engine airplanes.

== Accidents and incidents ==
- On July 10, 2004, a Griffing Flying Service aircraft experienced a bird strike while flying from Put-in-Bay to Middle Bass Island. The pilot was bloodied in the incident and received medical attention upon landing at Middle Bass.
- On December 27, 2012, a Piper PA-32 Cherokee Six was damaged while landing at Middle Bass Island Airport. The airplane touched down short of the runway threshold during landing. When the airplane's landing gear contacted the edge of the paved runway, the right main landing gear separated from the airplane. The airplane sustained substantial damage to the right main wing spar. The probable cause of the accident was found to be the pilot's failure to attain the proper touchdown point during landing, which resulted in impact with the edge of the runway surface.

== See also ==
- List of airports in Ohio
