= Pelee Island Airport =

Airport located on Pelee Island, Ontario, Canada

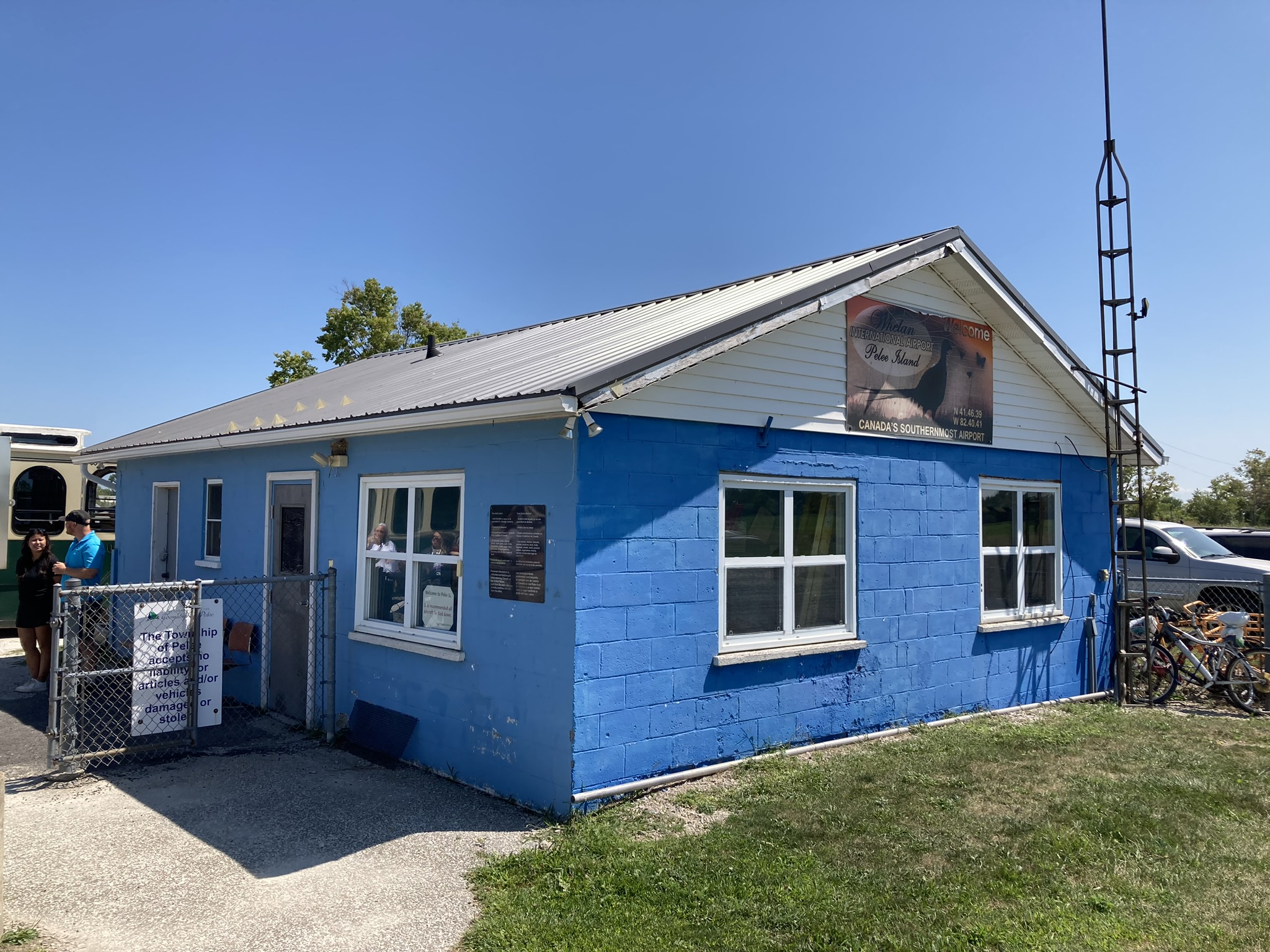
- The operations building of Pelee Island Airport
- IATA: none; ICAO: CYPT

Summary
- Airport type: Public
- Operator: Township of Pelee
- Serves: Pelee Island
- Location: Pelee Island, Ontario, Canada
- Time zone: EST (UTC−05:00)
  - Summer (DST): EDT (UTC−04:00)
- Elevation AMSL: 572 ft (174 m)
- Coordinates: 41°46′39″N 082°40′41″W

Map
- Location in Ontario

Runways
Direction	Length		Surface
Direction	ft	m	Surface
10/28	3,303	1,007	Asphalt
01/19	2,113	644	Gravel
- Source: Canada Flight Supplement

Pelee Island Airport (ICAO: CYPT) is located adjacent to the west side of Pelee, Ontario, Canada. Approximately 5,500 passengers passed through Pelee Island Airport in 2009.

The airport is classified as an airport of entry by Nav Canada and is staffed by the Canada Border Services Agency (CBSA). CBSA officers at this airport can handle general aviation aircraft only, with no more than 15 passengers. The airport mainly handles propeller aircraft only with focus on private general aviation and regularly scheduled flights.

== Terminal ==
The airport has a single-story blue terminal building that also serves as the Canada Border Services Agency office. There are three other buildings around the small tarmac.

== Airlines and destinations ==
Airlines	Destinations	Refs
Griffing Flying Service	Charter: Port Clinton, Ohio, Kelleys Island, Ohio, Middle Bass Island, Ohio, North Bass Island, Ohio, Put-in-Bay, Ohio	
Cameron Air Services	Seasonal: Windsor, Ontario	
