= Gypsum, Ohio =

- Unincorporated community
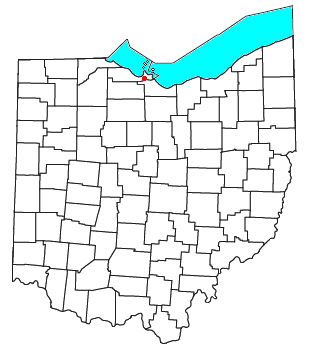
- Location of Gypsum, Ohio
- Coordinates: 41°29′56″N 82°52′25″W
- Country: United States
- State: Ohio
- County: Ottawa
- Township: Portage
- Elevation: 584 ft (178 m)
- Time zone: UTC-5 (Eastern (EST))
  - Summer (DST): UTC-4 (EDT)
- ZIP codes: 43433
- GNIS feature ID: 1048810

Gypsum is an unincorporated community in eastern Portage Township, Ottawa County, Ohio, United States. It has a post office with the ZIP code 43433.

The community is named for deposits of the gypsum rock near the original town site. Gypsum mining in the area by U.S. Gypsum Corporation began in 1902 and stopped in the 1970s, however the company continues to operate a manufacturing plant in the community.

Children from Gypsum families generally attend the Port Clinton City School District.

== United States Gypsum Corporation ==
United States Gypsum Corporation began mining gypsum in the community in 1902. In 1918, the company built a wallboard-paper mill there. In the 1970s, after switched to processing synthetic gypsum, the company abandoned the mine, which eventually flooded.

Despite abandoning its gypsum mine, USG continues to operate an adjacent manufacturing plant, trucking in the synthetic gypsum used to manufacture drywall. In 1999, the company expanded the plant, adding a Fiberock line. As of 2013, USG manufactures sheetrock drywall and ready-mixed joint compound at the plant, employing 230 people, down from 380 in 2004.

In 2013, the mine, which remained abandoned for over 40 years began collapsing as water dissolved some of the underground gypsum rock, primarily calcium sulfate, resulting in depressions and sinkholes in the area. From 2013 to 2015, the Ohio Department of Transportation paid The Beaver Excavating Company US$20,668,621.89 to fill the mine with grout, while diverting traffic from Ohio State Route 2 in the process. USG did not contribute funds. As of 2019, USG, which is headquartered in Chicago, Illinois, operates as a subsidiary of Knauf.
