= Griffing Sandusky Airport =

- IATA: ~~SKY~~; ICAO: ~~KSKY~~; FAA LID: ~~SKY~~

Summary
- Airport type: Public
- Owner: Griffing-Sandusky Airport, Inc.
- Serves: Sandusky, Ohio
- Elevation AMSL: 580 ft (180 m)
- Coordinates: 41°26′00″N 082°39′08″W

Map
- Location of airport in Ohio SKY (the United States)

Runways
Direction	Length		Surface
Direction	ft	m	Surface
18/36	2,593	790	Asphalt
9/27	3,559	1,085	Asphalt

Statistics (2008)
- Aircraft operations: ?
- Based aircraft: 44
- Source: Federal Aviation Administration

Griffing Sandusky Airport (IATA: ~~SKY~~, ICAO: ~~KSKY~~, FAA LID: ~~SKY~~) was a public airport in Erie County, Ohio, next to Sandusky Bay three miles southeast of Sandusky.

== History ==
A bond issue for the City of Sandusky to purchase a site for a new airport was rejected by voters in November 1930. Instead, the city chose to lease an existing airport operated by Jack Parker in November 1934. (Note: Two alternate locations were considered, but turned down.) It then subleased the airport to the U.S. Bureau of Air Commerce in April 1936 in exchange for the federal government completing the facility. The city elected not to buy the airport at the end of its lease in February 1939 and so it reverted to the owner, John Hinde, the following month. John then delegated operation of the airport to his relative, William Hinde.

By September 1953, Ralph Dietrick had founded a company called Travelair Taxi and used it to acquire the assets of Island Air Service from Milton Hershberger. (Note: Dietrick was a flight instructor at the airport in 1944.) At the same time, he renamed his existing flying service Sandusky Airport, Inc. and Sky Tours, Inc. was established as a subsidiary to operate the former airline. Travelair Taxi then purchased the airport from the Hindes and Petersons in November 1956. (Note: William Hinde would then move his operations to Huron Airport northwest of Huron, Ohio.) By late August of the following year, a new administration building had been constructed.

Lake Central Airlines service to the airport was authorized by the Civil Aeronautics Board in August 1960. However, ahead of the planned start of service the FAA declined to approve the airport for twin engine commercial flights, citing the lack of a completely paved runway. Following attempts by Harry Griffing to purchase the airport from Sky Tours, a complex deal was reached in March 1962 which the former took ownership of the airport, while the latter moved to Port Clinton Municipal Airport. (Note: Griffing had previously operated the Sandusky Airport on 57 acres (230,000 m^{2}) of land on South Columbus Avenue. After the acquisition of the airport, the original location was to be sold.) In 1965, the city considered leasing the runways to enable them to be extended from 3,600 feet (1,100 m) and 2,800 feet (850 m) to 5,500 feet (1,700 m).

A dispute arose in March 1974 over whether a VOR/DME beacon should be installed at the airport or the Erie–Ottawa Regional Airport.

Griffing Flying Service announced it would be moving to the Regional Erie–Ottawa County Airport in June 2012. The airport permanently closed on December 31, 2013 and the FAA A/FD and VFR sectional charts no longer show the airport as open or operational. Instrument approach procedures are no longer available from the FAA's website. All hangars and the entrance were demolished in April, 2016. The Sandusky Register confirmed that the city announced that a sports park called the Cedar Point Sports Center will replace the airport; it opened in spring 2017.

== Facilities and aircraft ==
The airport covered 133 acres (54 ha) at an elevation of 580 feet (177 m) above mean sea level. It had two asphalt runways: 18/36, 2,593 by 40 feet (790 x 12 m) and 9/27, 3,559 by 60 feet (1,085 x 18 m).

In the year ending May 6, 2008 the airport's operations were distributed as follows: 58% general aviation, 40% air taxi and 1% military. 44 aircraft were then based at this airport: 79.5% single-engine and 20.5% multi-engine airplanes.

== Airlines and destinations ==
Griffing Flying Service offered scheduled passenger service to Sandusky until December 2013. The nearest airport with scheduled passenger service is Erie-Ottawa International Airport in Port Clinton.

== Accidents and incidents ==
- On 17 March 1978, a single-engine airplane crashed after taking off from the airport, killing the pilot.
- On 1 July 1988, a single-engine airplane crashed while landing at the airport, critically injuring the pilot.
- On August 10, 2002, a Cessna Citation 500 was substantially damaged during a deer strike while departing from the Griffing Sandusky Airport. The pilot reported that he was departing on runway 09. During rotation, a deer crossed the runway and impacted the nose gear of the airplane. The pilot continued the takeoff and diverted to Toledo Express Airport (TOL). The pilot made two passes over TOL, while ground rescue personnel verified that the nose landing gear was not fully extended. After burning additional fuel, the pilot made an approach to runway 25 at TOL. About 100 feet above the ground, he shut down the engines, fuel shut-off, and generators. The airplane then landed on runway 25 and came to rest on the fork of the nose gear and gear doors. The probable cause of the accident was found to be a collision with a deer during a night takeoff.
- On July 20, 2003, a Piper PA-28 was substantially damaged during a go-around at the Griffing Sandusky Airport. The pilot reported that while turning onto the final approach path, he observed a twin-engine airplane on a taxiway near the runway. The pilot was not certain if the airplane was going to utilize the runway, and elected to go-around. The pilot subsequently applied full power and retracted one of two notches of flaps. The pilot observed the twin-engine airplane passing under his airplane's wing. The Piper's engine then began to "stumble," and the pilot felt the yoke in his left hand becoming very heavy. He looked down at the power quadrant and noticed that the engine mixture control was pulled back. The pilot pushed mixture control in and lowered the airplane's nose to avoid a stall; however, the airplane struck trees about 1/2 mile beyond the departure end of the runway. The probable cause of the accident was found to be the pilot's failure to maintain the engine mixture control during the go-around, which resulted in a loss of power and an in-flight collision with trees.
- On May 4, 2011, a Commander 114B airplane was substantially damaged while landing at the Griffing Sandusky Airport. The pilot reported that the final approach was uneventful and that there was a 6 knot crosswind that required aileron input to manage. The airplane touched down on the main landing gear, slightly right of the runway centerline, and the landing roll was uneventful for 40-60 yards until the aircraft veered left. The pilot's application of right rudder and full right brake were not successful in regaining directional control. The airplane departed the left side of the runway into an area of soft grass. The airplane subsequently swerved back onto the runway before coming to rest. The probable cause of the accident was found to be the pilot's inadequate directional control while landing in a variable crosswind.
