= Liberty Aviation Museum =

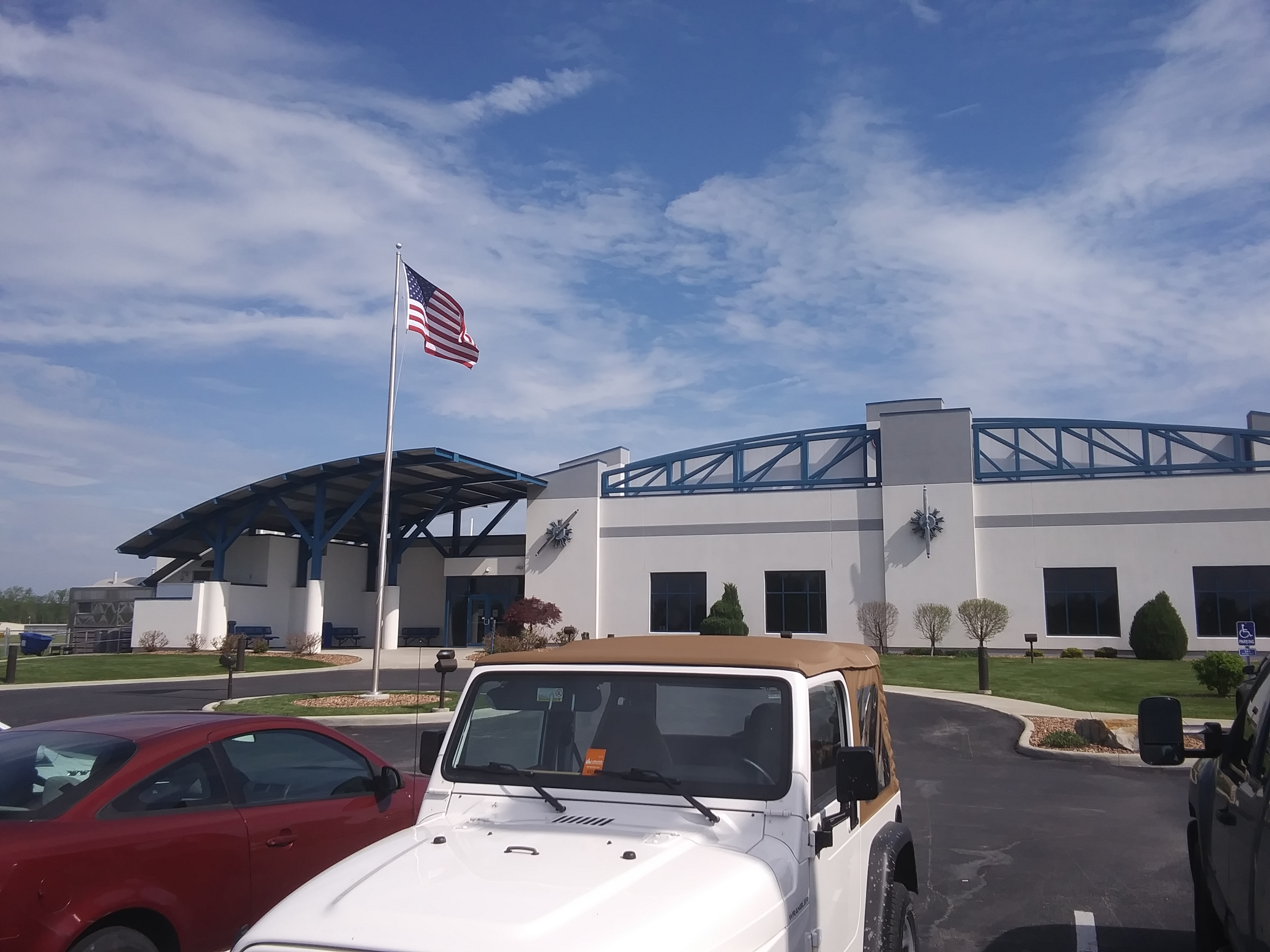
- Museum entrance

- Location within Ohio
- Established: 1991
- Location: Port Clinton, Ohio, United States
- Coordinates: 41.5092°N 82.8646°W
- Type: Aviation museum
- Founder: Ed Patrick
- Website: libertyaviationmuseum.org

The Liberty Aviation Museum is located near Port Clinton, Ohio, United States, adjacent to the Erie–Ottawa International Airport.

== History ==
The Liberty Aviation Museum owns a 1928 Ford 5-AT Tri-motor, currently operating with the Experimental Aircraft Association for the Fly the Ford tour. The Tri-Motor Heritage Foundation is also based at the museum where some volunteers of the EAA Chapter 1247 are restoring an Island Airlines 1929 5-AT Ford Trimotor.

The museum opened on 20 July 2012.

Also at the Liberty Aviation Museum, is the Tin Goose Diner. The diner is a vintage 1950s O'Mahoney diner, originally operating in Jim Thorpe, Pennsylvania under the name of Sunrise Diner. The Diner became a permanent addition to the Liberty Aviation Museum in 2012.

In 2015, the museum won a lawsuit against Treasure Cove Marina, arguing that they were overcharged for the restoration of their PT-boat, PT-728.

The museum announced it had received permission to build a new 12,000 sq ft (1,100 m^{2}) hangar in July 2025. The hangar was completed by September 2026.

== Collection ==
=== Aircraft ===
- Consolidated PBY-6A Catalina 46662
- Ford 5-AT-B Trimotor 5-AT-8 "City of Port Clinton"/"City of Wichita"
- North American TB-25N Mitchell 44-86777 "Georgie's Gal" – It was previously known as "Martha Jean".
- Grumman TBM-3E Avenger 91436
- North American Harvard IV MM53844 – This aircraft was retired from the Italian Air Force in the 1970s, is painted in Royal Canadian Air Force colors, and is not owned by the museum.

=== Watercraft ===
- PT-728 MTB Vosper Torpedo Boat (under restoration)
- PT-724 MTB Vosper Torpedo Boat (awaiting restoration)

== See also ==
- List of aerospace museums
