= Curtice, Ohio =

- Census-designated place
- Location in Lucas County and the state of Ohio.
- Coordinates: 41°37′06″N 83°22′04″W
- Country: United States
- State: Ohio
- Counties: Ottawa and Lucas
- Townships: Allen and Jerusalem

Area
  - Total: 3.68 sq mi (9.54 km^{2})
  - Land: 3.68 sq mi (9.54 km^{2})
  - Water: 0 sq mi (0.00 km^{2})
- Elevation: 591 ft (180 m)

Population (2020)
  - Total: 1,552
  - Density: 421.4/sq mi (162.72/km^{2})
- Time zone: UTC-5 (Eastern (EST))
  - Summer (DST): UTC-4 (EDT)
- ZIP codes: 43412
- FIPS code: 39-19736
- GNIS feature ID: 2628879

Curtice is a census-designated place in northern Allen Township, Ottawa County, and southwestern Jerusalem Township, Lucas County, Ohio, United States. As of the 2020 census it had a population of 1,552. It has a post office, with the ZIP code of 43412.

== Demographics ==
Historical population
Census	Pop.	Note	%±
2020	1,552		—
U.S. Decennial Census

== Notable people ==
- Chris Bassitt, professional baseball player
- Michael Deiter, professional football player
- Jordan Kovacs, former professional football player
- Madison Sheahan, deputy director of United States Immigration and Customs Enforcement (ICE)
