= North Bass Island Airport =

- IATA: none; ICAO: none; FAA LID: 3X5

Summary
- Airport type: Public
- Owner: Put-in-Bay Township Port Authority
- Serves: North Bass Island
- Location: North Bass Island, Ohio
- Elevation AMSL: 594 ft (181 m)
- Coordinates: 41°43′04″N 082°49′16″W

Map
- Location of airport in Ohio 3X5 (the United States)

Runways
Direction	Length		Surface
Direction	ft	m	Surface
01/19	1,804	550	Asphalt

Statistics
- Aircraft operations: 1,000
- Source: Federal Aviation Administration

North Bass Island Airport (FAA LID: 3X5) is a public airport located on North Bass Island, Ohio, United States. It is owned and operated by the Put-in-Bay Township Port Authority.

Approaches to the airport are challenging due to the airport's close proximity to the Canadian border. Canadian airspace is 2 miles from the runway's threshold.

The airport is mainly used to bring mail to North Bass Island and to transport citizens to and from nearby islands as well as mainland Ohio.

The airport received a $22,000 grant in 2021 to provide economic relief funds for costs related to operations, personnel, cleaning, sanitization, janitorial services, debt service payments, and combating the spread of pathogens.

The airport received $113,000 from the Federal Aviation Administration in late 2023.

== Airlines and destinations ==
Airlines	Destinations
Griffing Flying Service	Charter: Port Clinton, Ohio, Kelleys Island, Ohio, Middle Bass Island, Ohio, Put-in-Bay, Ohio, Pelee Island, Ontario,

== Facilities and aircraft ==
North Bass Island Airport covers an area of 33 acres (13 ha) which contains one runway designated 01/19 with a 1,804 ft × 60 ft (550 m × 18 m) asphalt pavement.

There is no fixed-base operator at the airport.

For the 12-month period ending October 1, 2020, the airport had 1,716 aircraft operations, an average of 33 per week, including 58% general aviation and 42% air taxi. No aircraft are based at the airport.

== See also ==
- List of airports in Ohio
