= Erie–Ottawa International Airport =

Public use airport in Ottawa, Ohio

- IATA: none; ICAO: KPCW; FAA LID: PCW

Summary
- Airport type: Public
- Owner: Erie–Ottawa Airport Authority
- Serves: Port Clinton, Ohio
- Time zone: UTC−05:00 (-5)
  - Summer (DST): UTC−04:00 (-4)
- Elevation AMSL: 590 ft (180 m)
- Coordinates: 41°30′59″N 082°52′10″W
- Website: PortClintonAirport.com

Map
- Location of airport in Ohio PCW (the United States)

Runways
Direction	Length		Surface
Direction	ft	m	Surface
9/27	5,646	1,721	Asphalt
18/36	4,002	1,220	Asphalt

Statistics (2020)
- Aircraft operations: 54,150
- Based aircraft: 98
- Source: Federal Aviation Administration

Erie–Ottawa International Airport, also known as Carl R. Keller Field, (ICAO: KPCW, FAA LID: PCW) (Note: The airport formerly used the FAA location identifier 1G7.) is three miles east of Port Clinton, in Ottawa County, Ohio. It is owned by the Erie–Ottawa Airport Authority. The National Plan of Integrated Airport Systems for 2011–2015 categorized it as a general aviation facility. On November 9, 2013, Erie–Ottawa Airport obtained approval to handle international flights.

Most U.S. airports use the same three-letter location identifier for the FAA and IATA, this airport’s IATA code is KPCW.

The airport is the base for a number of local businesses that operate in the surrounding areas.

== History ==
An agreement to move the Vickery emergency landing field to the airport was reached in mid June 1942. The deal included a plan to increase the size of the field to 105 acres (42 ha). The site for the Peninsular Airport was acquired by the village of Port Clinton in early October 1946. By no later than mid July 1953 it was known as the Port Clinton Municipal Airport.

The airport was closed by the Civil Aeronautics Administration in March 1952, following the crash of a Beechcraft Bonanza a week earlier that injured the four occupants. An investigation by the CAA a week before the accident revealed that the condition of the field had deteriorated to the point that there were large ruts in the runway. By April, efforts had begun to build a 2,000-foot (610 m) stone runway to solve the problem. By late May, a dispute arose over the expiration of an exclusive rights contract by Milt Hersberger, the operator of a local air service. The possibility of continuing such a contract was rejected by the Board of Public Service and the airport committee in June, who both also proposed instituting a landing fee.

The airport's flying club was renamed the Tin Goose Flying Club in November 1961.

A state grant to the airport was approved in early March 1968. Construction to extend the existing 1,650-foot (500 m) east-west runway to 4,500 feet (1,400 m) began in late May. The subtitle Carl R. Keller Field was added the airport's name approximately a week later to recognize the role of the eponymous former mayor and chairman of the airport advisory committee in promoting the airport. In late June, a joint airport authority for both Erie and Ottawa Counties was established. The east-west runway was completed in early summer 1968. It was selected as the location for the county's regional airport in early September, but later that month a group seeking that designation for the Griffing Sandusky Airport prevented the associated $100,000 grant from being assigned to it. The airport was dedicated on 13 October 1968 and the following month the airport authority won a ruling allowing it to continue to apply for the grant. By late March 1969, the facility's name had been changed to the Erie–Ottawa Regional Airport. By September 1970, a project to lengthen the east-west runway to 5,000 feet (1,500 m) and widen the north-south runway to 65 feet (20 m) was nearly complete. Sandusky County voted to join the airport authority to make it a three-way organization in late March 1971. A grant of $150,000 to the authority was approved by the state in late June. (Note: The $150,000 was a combination of three $50,000 grants from each of the counties.) Construction to extend the north-south runway to 4,000 feet (1,200 m) had begun by early October.

Island Airlines, which had operated out of the airport since 1930 was sold to Griffing Flying Service in September 1992.

An increase in parking lot fees in November 2000 caused irritation for people that flew into the airport from islands in Lake Erie. Avion Management Services, the airport operator, left in May 2001 due to a lack of business. By mid October 2002, the ramp was being expanded to accommodate additional jet traffic.

The Liberty Aviation Museum opened at the airport in July 2012. Construction of seven 4,320-square-foot (401 m^{2}) private hangars had begun by late September 2013. Following the construction of a Border Patrol facility in 2014, it became Erie–Ottawa International Airport. Work on a 1,760-square-foot (164 m^{2}) Customs Service office began in September 2016.

The airport received a series of grants starting in the mid-2010s, including: $639,000 in 2015 to rehabilitate the paved surfaces, $300,000 in 2017 to update its master plan and layout, $4.5 million in 2019 to build additional taxiways to allow for more hangar space at the airport and upgrade lighting, and $1.1 million in 2021 to rehabilitate a taxi lane and improve structural integrity at parking aprons.

As of 2024, the airport was raising $10.3 million to upgrade its aircraft parking area. In 2023, Senator Sherrod Brown announced that a $294,000 grant was secured to begin construction of a new airplane parking ramp or new hangar, funded by the FAA Airport Terminal Program included in the Infrastructure Investment and Jobs Act that was signed into law by President Joe Biden.

== Facilities and aircraft ==
=== Facilities ===
The airport covers 407 acres (165 ha) at an elevation of 590 feet (180 m). It has two asphalt runways: runway 9/27 measures 5,646 by 100 feet (1,721 by 30 m), and runway 18/36 measures 4,002 by 75 feet (1,220 by 23 m).

The airport has a fixed-base operator that sells fuel. It offers services such as general maintenance, catering, hangars, courtesy transportation, and rental cars; it also has amenities such as conference rooms, a crew lounge, snooze rooms, and more.

The airport has a US customs office, allowing it to accept inbound international flights.

The airport is home to the Liberty Aviation Museum. There is also a diner at the airport.

=== Aircraft ===
In the year ending October 21, 2020, the airport had 54,150 aircraft operations, average 148 per day: 74% general aviation, 26% air taxi, and <1% military. 98 aircraft were then based at the airport: 80 single-engine and 11 multi-engine airplanes as well as 7 jet airplanes.

== Airlines and destinations ==
Airlines	Destinations
Griffing Flying Service	Charter: Kelleys Island, Ohio Middle Bass Island, Ohio North Bass Island, Ohio, Put-in-Bay, Ohio, Pelee Island, Ontario
Island Air Taxi	Charter: Put-in-Bay, Ohio

== Accidents and incidents ==
- On 14 March 1952, a Beechcraft Bonanza crashed after taking off from the airport, injuring the pilot and three passengers.
- On 21 August 1972, a Ford Trimotor crashed after taking off from the airport.
- On 26 July 1977, a Cessna 172 crashed while taking off from the airport.
- On October 7, 1990, a Beech V35 crashed while flying an instrument approach procedure to the Erie–Ottawa International Airport. The probable cause of the accident was found to be the pilot's failure to follow the proper instrument procedure and his failure to maintain the minimum descent altitude during an approach at night in instrument meteorological conditions.
- On December 29, 2014, a small plane crashed after takeoff from the Erie–Ottawa International Airport.
- On September 14, 2021, a Piper PA-32 Cherokee Six landed with its landing gear up at the Erie–Ottawa International Airport.

== See also ==
- List of airports in Ohio
