= Clay Center, Ohio =

- Village
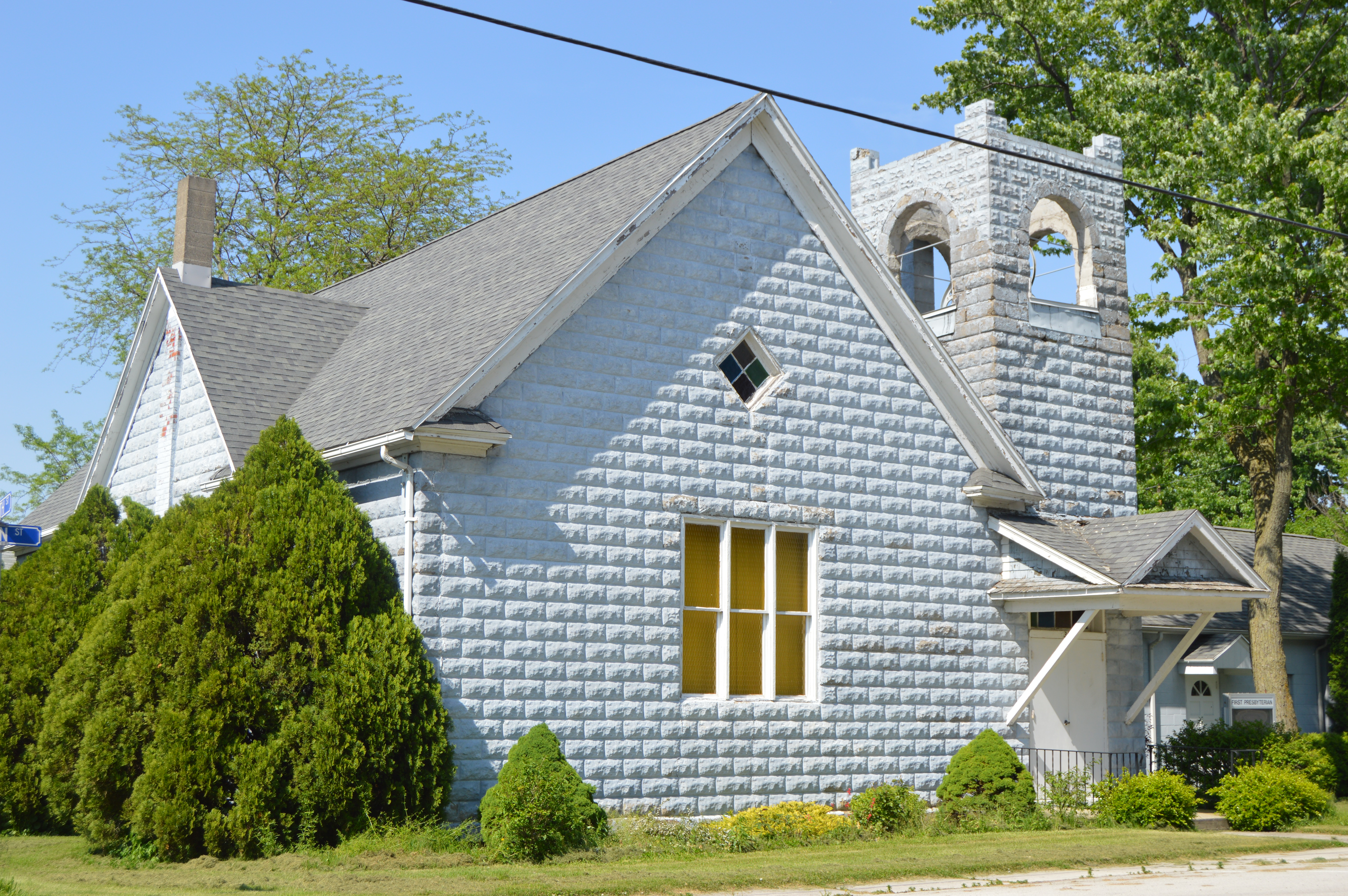
- Presbyterian church

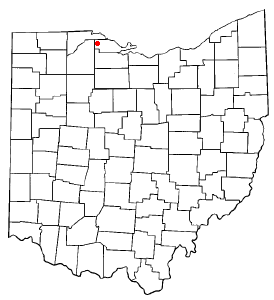
- Location of Clay Center, Ohio

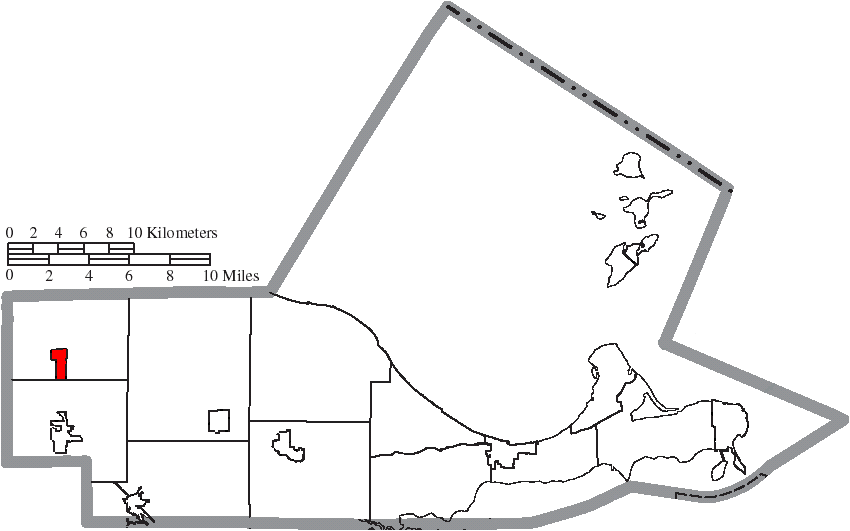
- Location of Clay Center in Ottawa County
- Coordinates: 41°34′23″N 83°21′51″W
- Country: United States
- State: Ohio
- County: Ottawa

Area
  - Total: 1.01 sq mi (2.62 km^{2})
  - Land: 1.01 sq mi (2.62 km^{2})
  - Water: 0 sq mi (0.00 km^{2})
- Elevation: 453 ft (138 m)

Population (2020)
  - Total: 262
  - Estimate (2023): 251
  - Density: 258.5/sq mi (99.82/km^{2})
- Time zone: UTC-5 (Eastern (EST))
  - Summer (DST): UTC-4 (EDT)
- ZIP code: 43408
- Area code: 419
- FIPS code: 39-15588
- GNIS feature ID: 2397636

Clay Center is a village in Ottawa County, Ohio, United States. The population was 262 at the 2020 census.

== History ==
Clay Center derives its name from originally being the center of a larger Clay Township. When Ottawa County was founded in 1840, Allen Township did not exist, but was the northern half of a larger Clay Township. When the Townships split in 1888, Clay Center became a part of Allen Township.

The town was founded by William Clark, a land speculator who believed a town in the center of the large township would be more likely to grow than the southern population center, Genoa. In 1883 Clay Township and Genoa discussed building a new Town Hall, and it was decided that Clay Township would help construct the building in downtown Genoa, instead of the geographic center in Clay Center. Local tradition states that this was the reason for Clay Township splitting in two a few years later.

== Geography ==
According to the United States Census Bureau, the village has a total area of 1.04 square miles (2.69 km^{2}), all land.

== Demographics ==
Historical population
Census	Pop.	Note	%±
1880	147		—
1950	590		—
1960	446		−24.4%
1970	370		−17.0%
1980	327		−11.6%
1990	289		−11.6%
2000	294		1.7%
2010	276		−6.1%
2020	262		−5.1%
2023 (est.)	251	▼	−4.2%
U.S. Decennial Census

=== 2010 census ===
As of the census of 2010, there were 276 people, 103 households, and 74 families living in the village. The population density was 265.4 inhabitants per square mile (102.5/km^{2}). There were 114 housing units at an average density of 109.6 per square mile (42.3/km^{2}). The racial makeup of the village was 98.2% White, 1.1% from other races, and 0.7% from two or more races. Hispanic or Latino of any race were 5.8% of the population.

There were 103 households, of which 35.0% had children under the age of 18 living with them, 50.5% were married couples living together, 11.7% had a female householder with no husband present, 9.7% had a male householder with no wife present, and 28.2% were non-families. 24.3% of all households were made up of individuals, and 14.6% had someone living alone who was 65 years of age or older. The average household size was 2.68 and the average family size was 3.20.

The median age in the village was 32.8 years. 26.4% of residents were under the age of 18; 11.3% were between the ages of 18 and 24; 26.1% were from 25 to 44; 21.8% were from 45 to 64; and 14.5% were 65 years of age or older. The gender makeup of the village was 46.0% male and 54.0% female.

=== 2000 census ===
As of the census of 2000, there were 294 people, 109 households, and 84 families living in the village. The population density was 325.6 inhabitants per square mile (125.7/km^{2}). There were 113 housing units at an average density of 125.2 per square mile (48.3/km^{2}). The racial makeup of the village was 98.30% White, 1.70% from other races. Hispanic or Latino of any race were 4.42% of the population.

There were 109 households, out of which 35.8% had children under the age of 18 living with them, 58.7% were married couples living together, 14.7% had a female householder with no husband present, and 22.9% were non-families. 20.2% of all households were made up of individuals, and 11.9% had someone living alone who was 65 years of age or older. The average household size was 2.70 and the average family size was 3.13.

In the village, the population was spread out, with 28.2% under the age of 18, 8.5% from 18 to 24, 29.6% from 25 to 44, 23.1% from 45 to 64, and 10.5% who were 65 years of age or older. The median age was 35 years. For every 100 females there were 97.3 males. For every 100 females age 18 and over, there were 88.4 males.

The median income for a household in the village was $55,000, and the median income for a family was $55,375. Males had a median income of $40,714 versus $27,813 for females. The per capita income for the village was $22,180. About 1.1% of families and 3.0% of the population were below the poverty line, including 4.6% of those under the age of eighteen and none of those 65 or over.
