= Williston, Ohio =

- Unincorporated community & Census-designated place
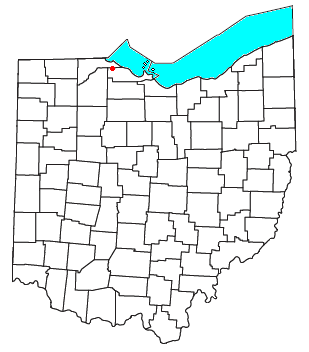
- Location of Williston, Ohio
- Coordinates: 41°36′09″N 83°20′31″W
- Country: United States
- State: Ohio
- County: Ottawa
- Township: Allen

Area
  - Total: 0.61 sq mi (1.58 km^{2})
  - Land: 0.61 sq mi (1.58 km^{2})
  - Water: 0 sq mi (0.00 km^{2})
- Elevation: 597 ft (182 m)

Population (2020)
  - Total: 439
  - Density: 718.0/sq mi (277.24/km^{2})
- Time zone: UTC-5 (Eastern (EST))
  - Summer (DST): UTC-4 (EDT)
- ZIP codes: 43468
- FIPS code: 39-85442
- GNIS feature ID: 2628987

Williston is an unincorporated community and census-designated place in northern Allen Township, Ottawa County, Ohio, United States, located along State Route 579. It is located in the northwestern part of the state, near Toledo. Its ZIP code is 43468. Its population was 439 people, according to the 2020 Census.

Local teenagers attend Genoa Area High School.

== Demographics ==
Historical population
Census	Pop.	Note	%±
2020	439		—
U.S. Decennial Census
