= Lakeside, Ohio =

Unincorporated community in Ohio

- Unincorporated community
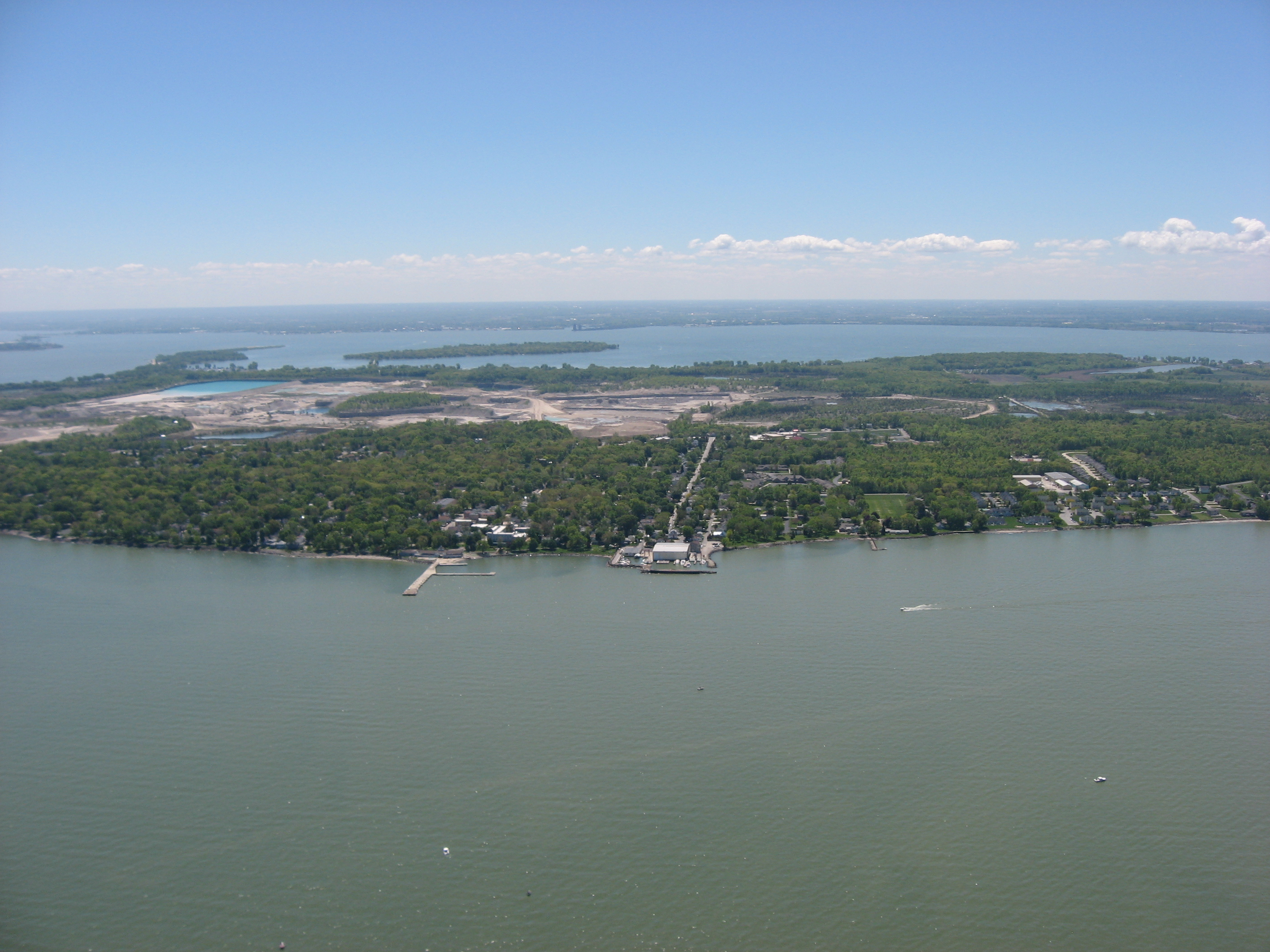
- Lakeside's shoreline

- Flag Logo

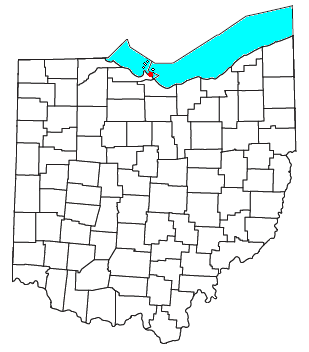
- Location of Lakeside, Ohio
- Coordinates: 41°32′30″N 82°45′07″W
- Country: United States
- State: Ohio
- County: Ottawa
- Township: Danbury

Area
  - Total: 0.69 sq mi (1.78 km^{2})
  - Land: 0.69 sq mi (1.78 km^{2})
  - Water: 0 sq mi (0.00 km^{2})
- Elevation: 607 ft (185 m)

Population (2020)
  - Total: 668
  - Density: 970.8/sq mi (374.83/km^{2})
- Time zone: UTC-5 (Eastern (EST))
  - Summer (DST): UTC-4 (EDT)
- ZIP codes: 43440
- FIPS code: 39-41552
- GNIS feature ID: 2628923
- Website: www.lakesideohio.com

Lakeside is a private community and census-designated place in Danbury Township, Ottawa County, Ohio, United States, on the shores of Lake Erie. It was formed in 1873 by members of the Methodist Church and remains a church-affiliated vacation resort and United Methodist Annual Conference site. It is one of only a few continuously operating Independent Chautauquas that persist in the 21st century. Located just west of the village of Marblehead, the community is approximately one square mile in size. As of the 2020 census, Lakeside had a population of 668. The entire community is listed on the National Register of Historic Places as the Lakeside Historic District.

As an unincorporated community, Lakeside is governed by the Lakeside Association, a company whose CEO is the de facto leader of the community. Its current CEO is Charles Allen.

Historical population
Census	Pop.	Note	%±
2020	668		—
U.S. Decennial Census

== History ==
Lakeside was established under the jurisdiction of the Central Ohio Conference of the UMC in August 1873. It was first founded as a tented revivalist camp, where it served as a hub for Methodist teachings. Meanwhile, the Chautauqua movement began to gain popularity. Lakeside soon thereafter became a Chautauqua, allowing its popularity to pick up over time and gain popularity with other denominations. The first permanent building was erected somewhere near the Hoover Auditorium, with the first residential cottages being built at the shores of Lake Erie. Despite this increase in popularity and permanent habitation, the bulk of services had yet to be provided until 1875, when the first part of Hotel Lakeside was built.

=== Residential land and usage ===
The first residential buildings were cottages, which were sold out on plots of land with renewable 99 year leases. Over the years, residents built cottages and houses on their plots. Most cottages are in the Victorian style, although different styles are present throughout. Restaurants and shops also opened around the downtown park of Lakeside. The Lakeside Association eventually purchased additional land on the eastern side, enabling the community to grow. Recreation facilities, meeting halls, places of worship, and parks have been added over the years. The Lakeside Association is responsible for the upkeep of all roads and public services within Lakeside. Lakeside has had its own symphony orchestra since its founding in 1963 with its current conductor, Daniel Meyer. One of its most famous activities is shuffleboard, with its courts hosting lots of national tournaments throughout its history.

== Architecture ==
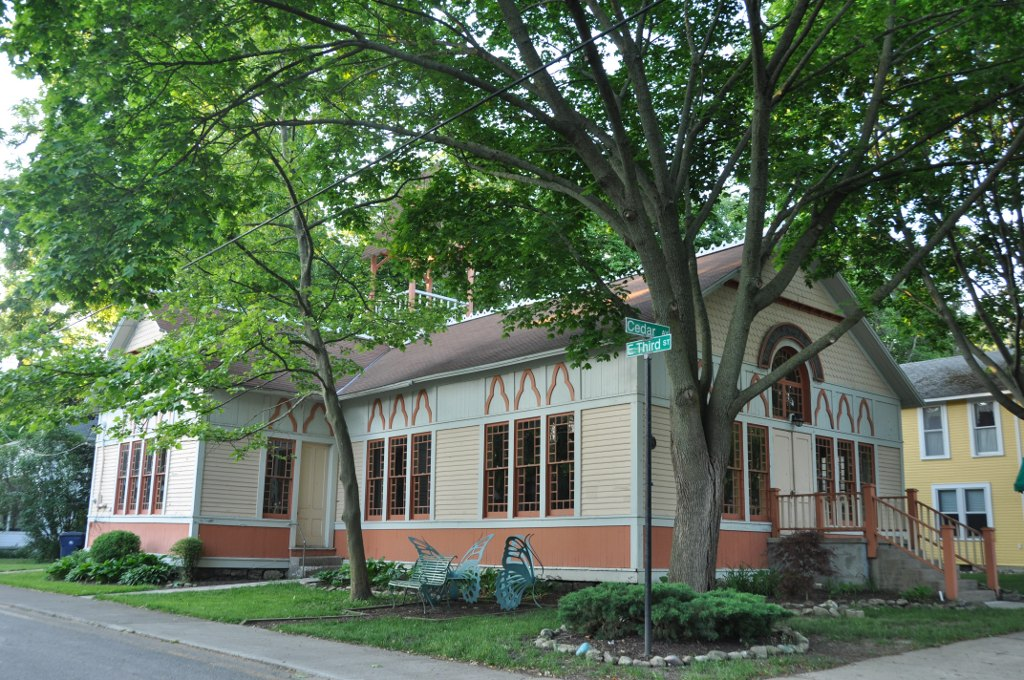
Bradley Temple, a meetinghouse in Lakeside used primarily for children's activities

Lakeside contains many well-preserved historic buildings. Many are in their original Victorian style. The Lakeside Association owns and operates a number of large assembly buildings:

- Hoover Auditorium (Third St. between Walnut and Central)
- South Auditorium (Sixth St. between Walnut and Central)
- Orchestra Hall (corner of Second and Walnut)
- Wesley Lodge (Fifth St. between Walnut and Central)

Places of worship:

- Lakeside United Methodist Church (corner of Fifth and Central)
- Chapel in the Woods (outdoor space along Maple past Seventh)
- Hoover Auditorium (Third St between Walnut and Central) Lakeside's main auditorium, with a seating capacity of 3,000 persons, is used for worship services on Sunday mornings and headline events during the week.
- Steele Memorial Bandstand & Pavilion, are used for Sunset Worship services (and other entertainment), Pavilion for early-to-middle late summer, and Pavilion in late summer.

== Notable visitors ==
Because Lakeside has historically been a summer vacation destination with few year-round residents, the listed here made at least one stop to Lakeside during their lifetime. One person who still spends many summers here is Steve Hartman. Famous people who have been to Lakeside & Hoover Auditorium are the likes of:

- Susan B. Anthony
- William Jennings Bryan
- Rose Woodallen Chapman (born in Lakeside)
- Amelia Earhart
- Eleanor Roosevelt
- Robert McFerrin
- Marian Anderson
- Pat Boone
- Emmylou Harris
- Ulysses S. Grant
- Rutherford B. Hayes
- William McKinley
- Champ Clark
- Drew Pearson
- J.C. Penney
- Lowell Thomas
- Jane Addams

== See also ==
- Lakeside and Marblehead Railroad
- Toledo, Port Clinton and Lakeside Railway
- Lakeside Association Police Department
