= Hinde Airport =

Public use airport near Huron, Ohio

- IATA: none; ICAO: none; FAA LID: 88D

Summary
- Airport type: Public
- Owner: Elaine H. & Joseph A. Bores
- Location: Huron, Ohio
- Time zone: UTC−05:00 (-5)
  - Summer (DST): UTC−04:00 (-4)
- Elevation AMSL: 609 ft (186 m)
- Coordinates: 41°24′16″N 082°36′11″W

Map
- Location of airport in Ohio 88D (the United States)

Runways
Direction	Length		Surface
Direction	ft	m	Surface
11/29	2,501	762	Turf

Statistics (2020)
- Aircraft Operations: 2,350
- Based aircraft: 25
- Sources: Federal Aviation Administration, AirNav, SkyVector

Hinde Airport (FAA LID: 88D) is a public use airport located 3 nautical miles northwest of Huron, Ohio.

== History ==
The history of the airport began as early as 1935 when Bill Hinde built a hangar at the family farm. Hinde, who had also owned Hinde Airport, moved his operations from that site to what was then named Huron Airport in 1958.

== Facilities and aircraft ==
=== Facilities ===
Hinde Airport has one runway, designated 11/29 with a turf surface measuring 2,501 by 70 feet (762 × 21 m).

The airport has a fixed-base operator that offers limited services. Parking includes tie-downs for visiting aircraft.

EAA Chapter 50 is located at the airport.

=== Aircraft ===
Based on the 12-month period ending 20 July 2020, the airport had 2,350 aircraft operations, an average of 45 per week. All were general aviation.

For the same time period, 25 aircraft are based on the field: 22 single-engine airplanes, 2 multi-engine airplanes and 1 ultralight.

== Accidents and incidents ==
- On 17 June 2002, a Piper PA-28 Cherokee crashed as a result of engine trouble while attempting to land at the airport.

== See also ==
- List of airports in Ohio
