= Danbury Township, Ohio =

Township in Ohio, US

Danbury Township, Ottawa County, Ohio
- Township
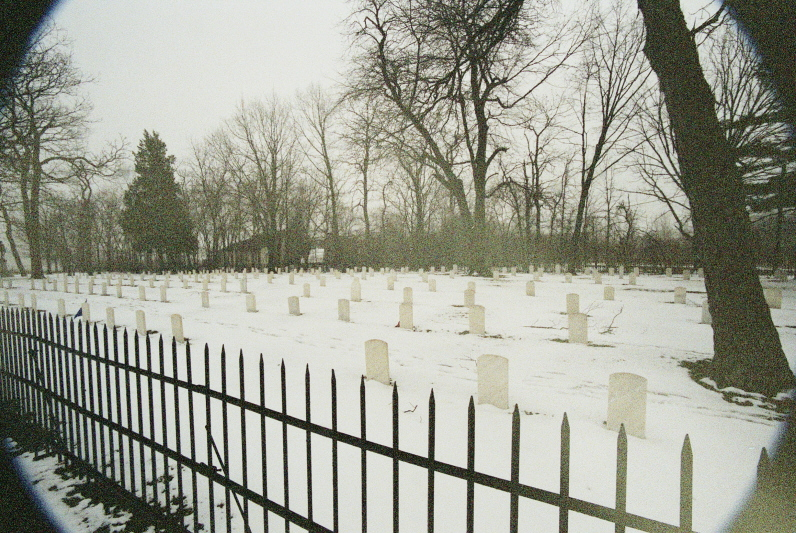
- Cemetery on Johnson's Island

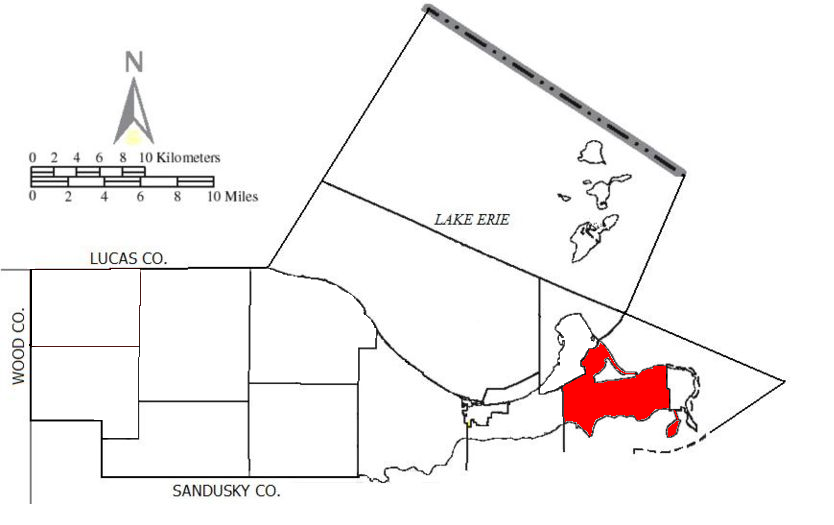
- Location of Danbury Township in Ottawa County.
- Coordinates: 41°31′56″N 82°45′58″W
- Country: United States
- State: Ohio
- County: Ottawa

Area
  - Total: 56.5 sq mi (146.4 km^{2})
  - Land: 18.2 sq mi (47.2 km^{2})
  - Water: 38.3 sq mi (99.2 km^{2})
- Elevation: 640 ft (195 m)

Population (2020)
  - Total: 4,924
  - Density: 270/sq mi (104.3/km^{2})
- Time zone: UTC-5 (Eastern (EST))
  - Summer (DST): UTC-4 (EDT)
- FIPS code: 39-20058
- GNIS feature ID: 1086760
- Website: Danbury Township

Danbury Township is one of the twelve townships of Ottawa County, Ohio, United States. The 2020 census found 4,924 people in the township.

== Communities ==
- Danbury, also known as Danbury Station, is an unincorporated community located within the southwest portion of the Township on the southwest portion of the Marblehead Peninsula along the shore of the Sandusky Bay.
- Lakeside is an unincorporated community and census-designated place located at 41°32′36″N 82°45′5″W along the shore of Lake Erie in the northeast portion of the township on the northeast portion of the Marblehead Peninsula. The entire community is listed on the National Register of Historic Places as the Lakeside Historic District.
- Marblehead is a village located at 41°32′5″N 82°43′45″W in the easter. portion of the Township and the eastern portion of the Marblehead Peninsula along the shores of Lake Erie.

== Name and history ==
It is the only Danbury Township statewide. This township is included in the region known as the Firelands and was originally a part of Huron County. It was named for Danbury, Connecticut, the native home of a large share of the first settlers.

Huron County was established by the Ohio General Assembly on February 7, 1809 and, at the time, comprised present-day Erie County (except for a small piece in the west); Huron County, Ruggles Township in Ashland County, Danbury Township, and part of Catawba Island Township.

Johnson's Island, the location of a significant Prisoner-of-war camp during the Civil War, is located in Sandusky Bay just south of the Marblehead Peninsula. It is now a part of the village of Marblehead.

== Geography ==
Located at the eastern point of the county at the end of the Marblehead Peninsula, it borders the following townships:

- Kelleys Island - northeast, across Lake Erie
- Sandusky - southeast, across Sandusky Bay
- Margaretta Township, Erie County - south, across Sandusky Bay
- Portage Township - west
- Catawba Island Township - northwest

== Demographics ==
The median age of males is 48.0 years of age. The median age of females is 48.6 years of age.

The median income for a household in the township was $55,578 in 2008. In 1999, the median income for a household in the township was $47,434.

== Government ==
The township is governed by a three-member board of trustees, who are elected in November of odd-numbered years to a four-year term beginning on the following January 1. Two are elected in the year after the presidential election and one is elected in the year before it. There is also an elected township fiscal officer, who serves a four-year term beginning on April 1 of the year after the election, which is held in November of the year before the presidential election. Vacancies in the fiscal officership or on the board of trustees are filled by the remaining trustees.

== Notable residents ==
- Louis C. Shepard, Medal of Honor recipient during the Civil War.
