= Clay Township, Ottawa County, Ohio =

Township in Ohio, US

- Township
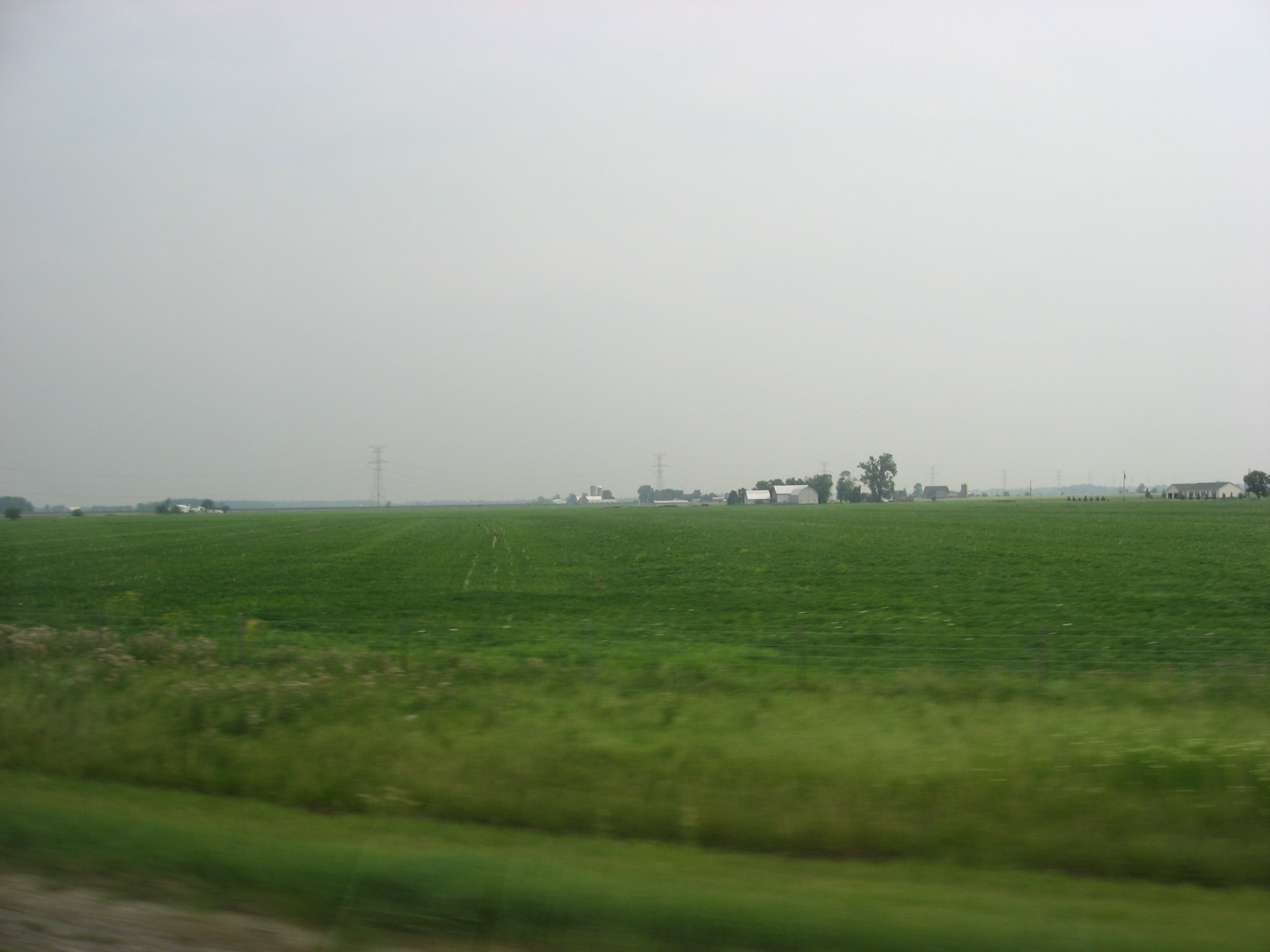
- Broad fields typical of Clay Township

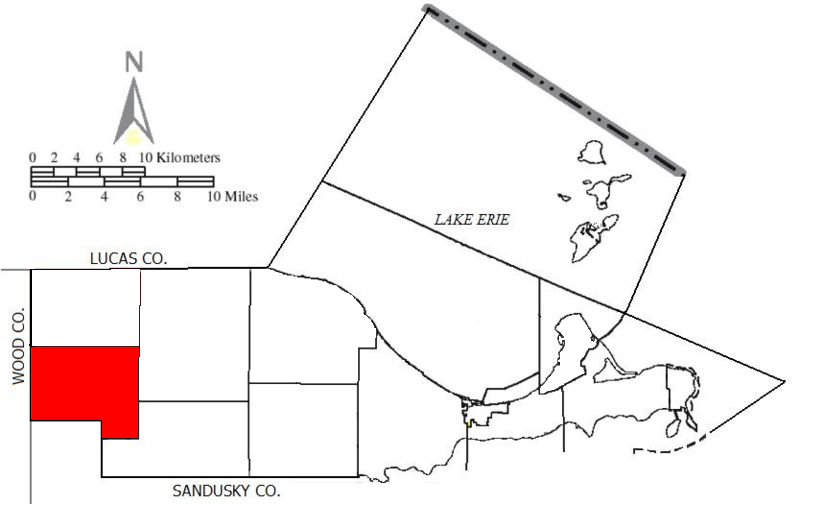
- Location of Clay Township in Ottawa County
- Coordinates: 41°31′32″N 83°21′20″W
- Country: United States
- State: Ohio
- County: Ottawa

Area
  - Total: 26.0 sq mi (67.4 km^{2})
  - Land: 26.0 sq mi (67.3 km^{2})
  - Water: 0.039 sq mi (0.1 km^{2})
- Elevation: 633 ft (193 m)

Population (2020)
  - Total: 4,825
  - Density: 186/sq mi (71.7/km^{2})
- Time zone: UTC-5 (Eastern (EST))
  - Summer (DST): UTC-4 (EDT)
- FIPS code: 39-15546
- GNIS feature ID: 1086759
- Website: https://www.claytownshipohio.net/

Clay Township is one of the twelve townships of Ottawa County, Ohio, United States. The 2020 census found 4,825 people in the township.

== Geography ==
Located in the southwestern corner of the county, it borders the following townships:

- Allen Township - north
- Benton Township - northeast
- Harris Township - southeast
- Woodville Township, Sandusky County - south
- Lake Township, Wood County - southwest
- Troy Township, Wood County - west

The village of Genoa is located in the center of the township, and the unincorporated communities of Forest Park and Martin lie in the township's northwest and northeast respectively.

== Name and history ==
Clay Township was named after statesman Henry Clay. It is one of nine Clay Townships statewide.

== Government ==
The township is governed by a three-member board of trustees, who are elected in November of odd-numbered years to a four-year term beginning on the following January 1. Two are elected in the year after the presidential election and one is elected in the year before it. There is also an elected township fiscal officer, who serves a four-year term beginning on April 1 of the year after the election, which is held in November of the year before the presidential election. Vacancies in the fiscal officership or on the board of trustees are filled by the remaining trustees.
