= Ottawa County, Ohio =

County in Ohio, United States

- County
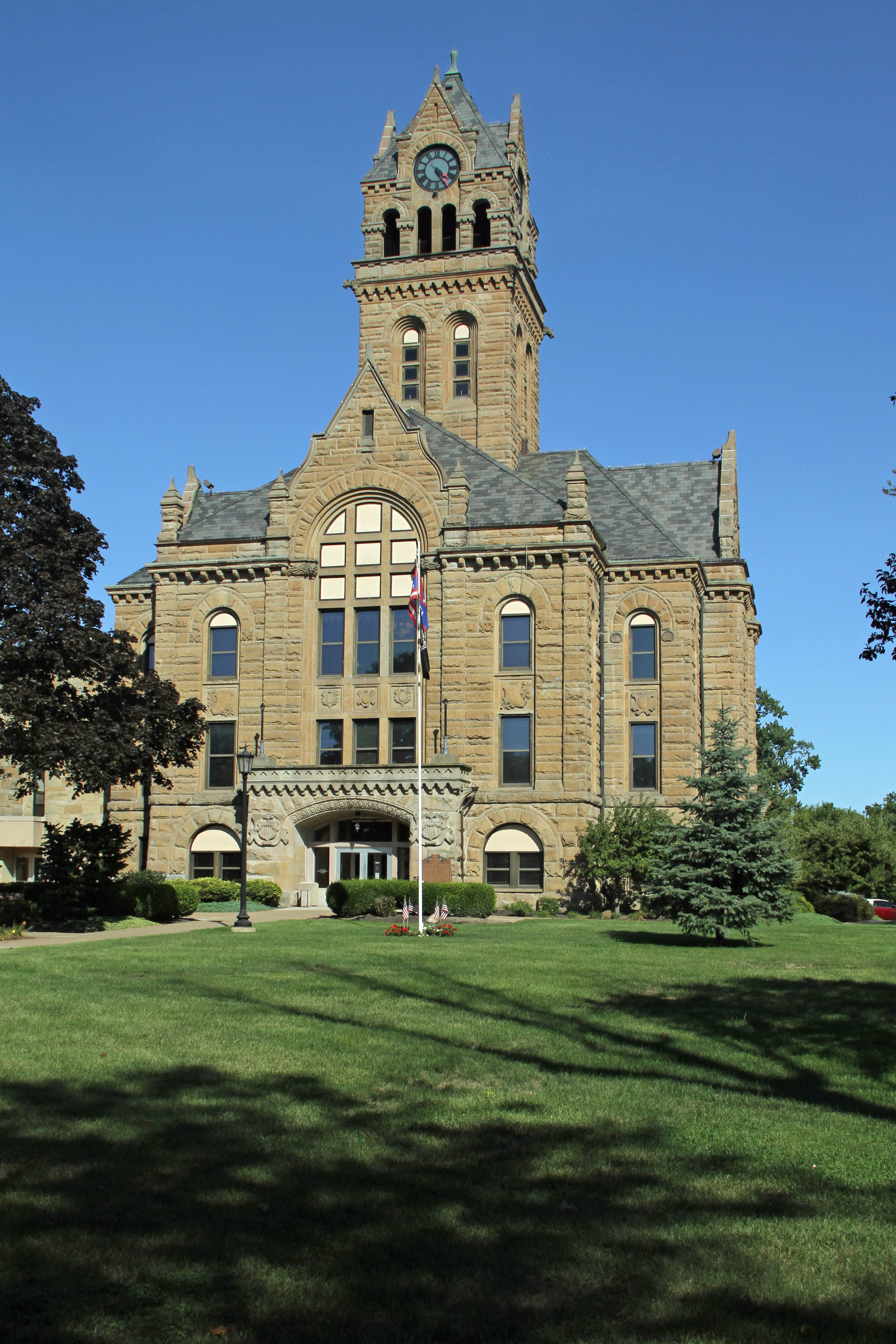
- Ottawa County Courthouse

- Flag Seal

- Location within the U.S. state of Ohio
- Coordinates: 41°35′N 83°04′W
- Country: United States
- State: Ohio
- Founded: March 6, 1840
- Named for: the Odawa tribe or a word meaning "trader"
- Seat: Port Clinton
- Largest city: Port Clinton

Area
  - Total: 585 sq mi (1,520 km^{2})
  - Land: 255 sq mi (660 km^{2})
  - Water: 330 sq mi (850 km^{2}) 56%

Population (2020)
  - Total: 40,364
  - Estimate (2025): 39,481 ▼
  - Density: 158/sq mi (61/km^{2})
- Time zone: UTC−5 (Eastern)
  - Summer (DST): UTC−4 (EDT)
- Congressional district: 9th
- Website: www.co.ottawa.oh.us

Ottawa County is a county located in the northwestern part of the U.S. state of Ohio. As of the 2020 census, the population was 40,364. Its county seat is Port Clinton. The county is named either for the Odawa (Ottawa) Indigenous peoples who lived there, or for an Indigenous word meaning "trader".

Ottawa County comprises the Port Clinton, OH Micropolitan Statistical Area, which is also included in the Toledo–Port Clinton, OH Combined Statistical Area.

== History ==
On September 10, 1813, during the War of 1812, nine vessels of the United States Navy under Commodore Oliver Hazard Perry, decisively defeated six vessels of Great Britain’s Royal Navy in the Battle of Lake Erie near Put-in-Bay. This action was one of the major battles of the war.

Ottawa County was formed on March 6, 1840, from portions of Erie, Lucas and Sandusky counties. It was named after the North American Indigenous tribe of the Odawa.

In 1974, the County Courthouse was listed on the National Register of Historic Places.

The county is notable in presidential politics for being a recent bellwether, having continuously voted for the winning candidate for thirteen elections from 1964 to 2016.

== Geography ==
According to the U.S. Census Bureau, the county has a total area of 585 square miles (1,520 km^{2}), of which 255 square miles (660 km^{2}) is land and 330 square miles (850 km^{2}) (56%) is water. It is the third-smallest county in Ohio by land area. It borders Ontario across Lake Erie.

=== Adjacent counties ===
- Essex County, Ontario, Canada (northeast across Lake Erie)
- Erie County (southeast)
- Sandusky County (south)
- Wood County (west)
- Lucas County (northwest)

=== National protected areas ===
- Ottawa National Wildlife Refuge (part)
- Perry's Victory and International Peace Memorial

== Demographics ==
Historical population
Census	Pop.	Note	%±
1840	2,248		—
1850	3,308		47.2%
1860	7,016		112.1%
1870	13,364		90.5%
1880	19,762		47.9%
1890	21,974		11.2%
1900	22,213		1.1%
1910	22,360		0.7%
1920	22,193		−0.7%
1930	24,109		8.6%
1940	24,360		1.0%
1950	29,469		21.0%
1960	35,323		19.9%
1970	37,099		5.0%
1980	40,076		8.0%
1990	40,029		−0.1%
2000	40,985		2.4%
2010	41,428		1.1%
2020	40,364		−2.6%
2025 (est.)	39,481	▼	−2.2%
U.S. Decennial Census; 1790–1960 1900–1990; 1990–2000 2020

=== 2020 census ===
As of the 2020 census, the county had a population of 40,364. The median age was 50.0 years. 18.4% of residents were under the age of 18 and 26.1% of residents were 65 years of age or older. For every 100 females there were 97.8 males, and for every 100 females age 18 and over there were 96.8 males age 18 and over.

The racial makeup of the county was 92.3% White, 0.9% Black or African American, 0.2% American Indian and Alaska Native, 0.4% Asian, <0.1% Native Hawaiian and Pacific Islander, 1.2% from some other race, and 4.9% from two or more races. Hispanic or Latino residents of any race comprised 5.1% of the population.

37.5% of residents lived in urban areas, while 62.5% lived in rural areas.

There were 17,748 households in the county, of which 23.2% had children under the age of 18 living in them. Of all households, 51.1% were married-couple households, 19.0% were households with a male householder and no spouse or partner present, and 23.5% were households with a female householder and no spouse or partner present. About 30.3% of all households were made up of individuals and 15.3% had someone living alone who was 65 years of age or older.

There were 28,596 housing units, of which 37.9% were vacant. Among occupied housing units, 79.7% were owner-occupied and 20.3% were renter-occupied. The homeowner vacancy rate was 1.4% and the rental vacancy rate was 11.0%.

=== Racial and ethnic composition ===
Ottawa County, Ohio – Racial and ethnic composition Note: the US Census treats Hispanic/Latino as an ethnic category. This table excludes Latinos from the racial categories and assigns them to a separate category. Hispanics/Latinos may be of any race.
Race / ethnicity (NH = Non-Hispanic)	Pop 1980	Pop 1990	Pop 2000	Pop 2010	Pop 2020	% 1980	% 1990	% 2000	% 2010	% 2020
White alone (NH)	38,313	38,132	38,767	38,780	36,436	95.60%	95.26%	94.59%	93.61%	90.27%
Black or African American alone (NH)	243	261	260	302	335	0.61%	0.65%	0.63%	0.73%	0.83%
Native American or Alaska Native alone (NH)	43	46	79	57	47	0.11%	0.11%	0.19%	0.14%	0.12%
Asian alone (NH)	54	87	93	114	157	0.13%	0.22%	0.23%	0.28%	0.39%
Native Hawaiian or Pacific Islander alone (NH)	x	x	20	7	6	x	x	0.05%	0.02%	0.01%
Other race alone (NH)	30	12	7	16	92	0.07%	0.03%	0.02%	0.04%	0.23%
Mixed race or Multiracial (NH)	x	x	224	397	1,232	x	x	0.55%	0.96%	3.05%
Hispanic or Latino (any race)	1,393	1,491	1,535	1,755	2,059	3.48%	3.72%	3.75%	4.24%	5.10%
Total	40,076	40,029	40,985	41,428	40,364	100.00%	100.00%	100.00%	100.00%	100.00%

=== 2010 census ===
As of the 2010 United States census, there were 41,428 people, 17,503 households, and 11,884 families living in the county. The population density was 162.5 inhabitants per square mile (62.7/km^{2}). There were 27,909 housing units at an average density of 109.5 per square mile (42.3/km^{2}). The racial makeup of the county was 96.5% white, 0.8% black or African American, 0.3% Asian, 0.2% American Indian, 0.9% from other races, and 1.3% from two or more races. Those of Hispanic or Latino origin made up 4.2% of the population. In terms of ancestry, 44.6% were German, 11.9% were Irish, 9.8% were English, 6.3% were American, and 6.1% were Polish.

Of the 17,503 households, 26.3% had children under the age of 18 living with them, 54.7% were married couples living together, 8.9% had a female householder with no husband present, 32.1% were non-families, and 27.4% of all households were made up of individuals. The average household size was 2.34 and the average family size was 2.82. The median age was 46.3 years.

The median income for a household in the county was $53,463 and the median income for a family was $64,258. Males had a median income of $52,736 versus $33,557 for females. The per capita income for the county was $27,809. About 6.3% of families and 9.0% of the population were below the poverty line, including 11.9% of those under age 18 and 6.5% of those age 65 or over.

=== 2000 census ===
As of the census of 2000, there were 40,985 people, 16,474 households, and 11,729 families living in the county. The population density was 161 inhabitants per square mile (62/km^{2}). There were 25,532 housing units at an average density of 100 units per square mile (39/km^{2}). The racial makeup of the county was 96.56% White, 0.65% Black or African American, 0.21% Native American, 0.23% Asian, 0.05% Pacific Islander, 1.44% from other races, and 0.87% from two or more races. 3.75% of the population were Hispanic or Latino of any race.

There were 16,474 households, out of which 29.10% had children under the age of 18 living with them, 58.90% were married couples living together, 8.50% had a female householder with no husband present, and 28.80% were non-families. 25.00% of all households were made up of individuals, and 11.20% had someone living alone who was 65 years of age or older. The average household size was 2.45 and the average family size was 2.92.

In the county, the population was spread out, with 23.30% under the age of 18, 6.70% from 18 to 24, 26.80% from 25 to 44, 26.80% from 45 to 64, and 16.40% who were 65 years of age or older. The median age was 41 years. For every 100 females there were 97.50 males. For every 100 females age 18 and over, there were 94.70 males.

The median income for a household in the county was $44,224, and the median income for a family was $51,919. Males had a median income of $39,823 versus $24,727 for females. The per capita income for the county was $21,973. About 4.20% of families and 5.90% of the population were below the poverty line, including 7.40% of those under age 18 and 5.40% of those age 65 or over.

== Politics ==
Prior to 1912, Ottawa County was a Democratic Party stronghold in presidential elections. Starting with the 1912 election, the county was a national bellwether, only backing losing candidates in 1940, 1944, 1960 (Richard Nixon) and 2020 (Donald Trump).

United States presidential election results for Ottawa County, Ohio
Year	Republican		Democratic		Third party(ies)	
Year	No.	%	No.	%	No.	%
1856	454	48.71%	477	51.18%	1	0.11%
1860	571	44.37%	692	53.77%	24	1.86%
1864	823	49.31%	846	50.69%	0	0.00%
1868	963	42.48%	1,304	57.52%	0	0.00%
1872	1,122	43.66%	1,439	55.99%	9	0.35%
1876	1,336	37.70%	2,208	62.30%	0	0.00%
1880	1,510	36.58%	2,559	61.99%	59	1.43%
1884	1,575	36.07%	2,742	62.80%	49	1.12%
1888	1,730	35.73%	3,065	63.30%	47	0.97%
1892	1,588	34.37%	2,943	63.70%	89	1.93%
1896	2,079	38.69%	3,260	60.67%	34	0.63%
1900	2,131	39.87%	3,185	59.59%	29	0.54%
1904	2,437	46.92%	2,706	52.10%	51	0.98%
1908	2,202	39.48%	3,329	59.69%	46	0.82%
1912	791	17.15%	2,728	59.16%	1,092	23.68%
1916	1,793	34.52%	3,347	64.44%	54	1.04%
1920	4,336	59.41%	2,867	39.28%	96	1.32%
1924	4,137	51.77%	2,571	32.17%	1,283	16.06%
1928	5,772	62.54%	3,435	37.22%	22	0.24%
1932	3,600	34.18%	6,817	64.73%	115	1.09%
1936	4,006	35.96%	6,335	56.87%	798	7.16%
1940	6,872	55.29%	5,556	44.71%	0	0.00%
1944	6,922	58.35%	4,941	41.65%	0	0.00%
1948	5,591	47.45%	6,157	52.25%	35	0.30%
1952	8,708	59.99%	5,808	40.01%	0	0.00%
1956	8,806	62.98%	5,176	37.02%	0	0.00%
1960	9,260	58.34%	6,612	41.66%	0	0.00%
1964	5,639	36.96%	9,618	63.04%	0	0.00%
1968	7,149	47.30%	6,319	41.81%	1,647	10.90%
1972	9,772	57.86%	6,465	38.28%	652	3.86%
1976	8,241	45.04%	9,646	52.71%	412	2.25%
1980	8,641	51.18%	6,753	40.00%	1,489	8.82%
1984	10,920	60.41%	7,053	39.02%	102	0.56%
1988	9,352	53.39%	8,038	45.89%	127	0.73%
1992	6,782	34.26%	8,128	41.06%	4,885	24.68%
1996	6,991	37.01%	9,321	49.35%	2,576	13.64%
2000	9,917	49.66%	9,485	47.50%	566	2.83%
2004	12,073	51.91%	11,118	47.80%	68	0.29%
2008	10,624	46.01%	12,064	52.25%	402	1.74%
2012	10,538	46.83%	11,503	51.11%	464	2.06%
2016	12,653	56.52%	8,285	37.01%	1,447	6.46%
2020	14,628	60.83%	9,008	37.46%	410	1.71%
2024	14,872	61.86%	8,866	36.88%	304	1.26%

United States Senate election results for Ottawa County, Ohio1
Year	Republican		Democratic		Third party(ies)	
Year	No.	%	No.	%	No.	%
2024	13,317	56.19%	9,460	39.92%	921	3.89%

== Government and politics ==
=== County officials ===
The County elects 9 officeholders.

Office	Name	Party
Commissioner	Donald A. Douglas	Republican
Commissioner	Mark W. Stahl	Republican
Commissioner	Mark Coppeler	Republican
Prosecutor	James VanEerten	Republican
Sheriff	Stephen J. Levorchick	Republican
Clerk of Courts	Chris Enoch	Republican
Recorder	Nate Daniels	Republican
Treasurer	Anthony Hatmaker	Republican
Engineer	Dan Toris	Independent
Coroner	Vacant	
Auditor	Jennifer Widmer	Republican
Municipal Court Judge	John Klaehn	Republican
Common Pleas Court Judge	Bruce A. Winters	Independent
Juvenile Division Judge	Fredrick Haney III	Republican

== Transportation ==
=== Major highways ===
8 major highways run through Ottawa County, including two interstates, and eight state routes.

- Interstate 80 (Ohio Turnpike)
- Interstate 90 (Ohio Turnpike)
- Ohio State Route 2
- Ohio State Route 19
- Ohio State Route 51
- Ohio State Route 53
- Ohio State Route 105
- Ohio State Route 163
- Ohio State Route 269
- Ohio State Route 590

=== Airports ===
- Erie-Ottawa Regional Airport
- Middle Bass-East Point Airport
- Middle Bass Island Airport
- North Bass Island Airport
- Put-in-Bay Airport

== Communities ==
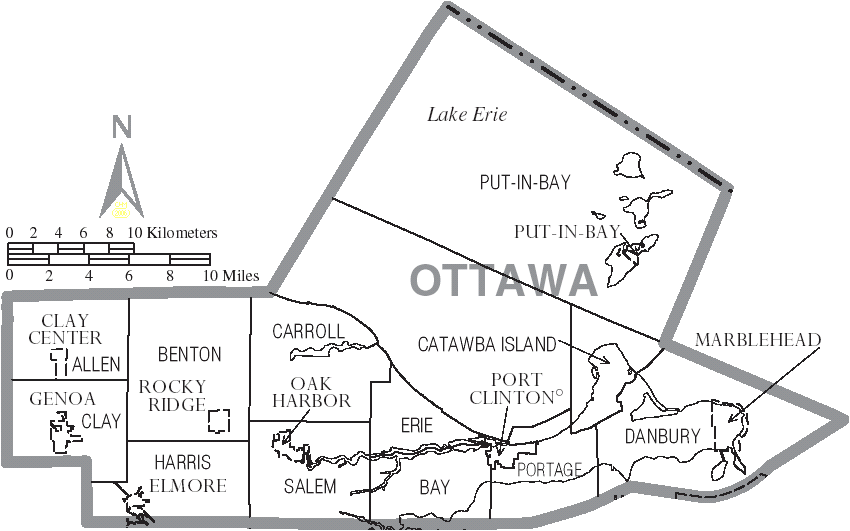
Map of Ottawa County, Ohio with municipal and township labels

=== City ===
- Port Clinton (county seat)

=== Villages ===
- Clay Center
- Elmore
- Genoa
- Marblehead
- Oak Harbor
- Put-in-Bay
- Rocky Ridge

=== Townships ===
- Allen
- Bay
- Benton
- Carroll
- Catawba Island
- Clay
- Danbury
- Erie
- Harris
- Portage
- Put-in-Bay
- Salem

=== Census-designated places ===
- Curtice
- Lakeside
- Williston

=== Unincorporated communities ===
- Catawba Island
- Danbury
- Elliston
- Forest Park
- Graytown
- Gypsum
- Isle St. George
- Lacarne
- Limestone
- Martin
- Middle Bass

== Notable residents ==
- Louis C. Shepard - American Civil War Medal of Honor recipient from Ashtabula County, buried in Lakeview cemetery, Port Clinton, Ohio.
- Crystal Bowersox, singer-songwriter, runner up on American Idol

== See also ==
- National Register of Historic Places listings in Ottawa County, Ohio
