= Louis C. Shepard =

Louis Capet Shepard
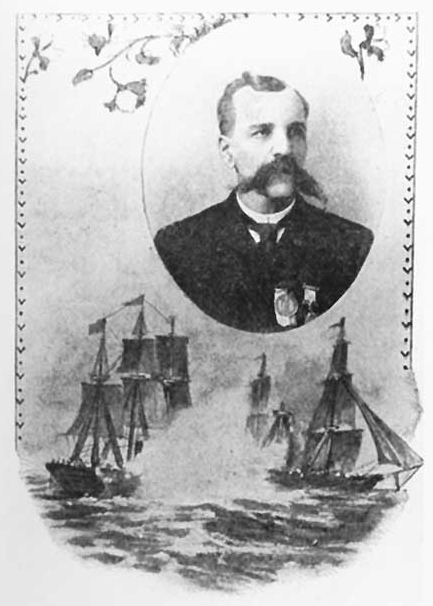
- Ordinary Seaman Louis C. Shepard
- Born: September 2, 1841; Ashtabula, Ohio, US
- Died: April 27, 1919 (aged 77); Danbury, Ohio, US
- Military career
- Allegiance: United States
- Branch: U.S. Army; U.S. Navy
- Service years: 1861–1865
- Rank: Private corporal Ordinary Seaman
- Units: Co. I 19th Ohio Infantry; 11th Indpt. Batt'y, N.Y. Light Art'y; USS Allegheny (1847); USS Wabash (1855); USS Commodore Perry (1859); USS Constellation (1854)
- Conflicts: American Civil War: Battle of Rich Mountain; Second Battle of Bull Run; Battle of Chancellorsville; Battle of Gettysburg; Battle of Mine Run; Second Battle of Fort Fisher
- Awards: Medal of Honor

Lewis Capet Shepard (September 2, 1841 – April 27, 1919) was a Union Navy sailor during the American Civil War who received America's highest military decoration, the Medal of Honor, for his actions at the Second Battle of Fort Fisher. Due to a Navy clerical error his citation records his first name as Louis.

== Army Service ==
Born in Ashtabula County, Ohio, Shepard enlisted as a private in Company I, of the 19th Ohio Infantry, mustering in on April 27, 1861, for a term of three months. During that time he participated in the Battle of Rich Mountain in Randolph County, Virginia (now West Virginia). This first major land battle of the civil war and Union victory propelled General George B. McClellan to command of the Army of the Potomac. According to Shepards 19th OVI muster card he spent three days on extra duty setting telegraph poles, mustering out of this unit August 30, 1861.

He reenlisted in the 11th Independent Battery, New York Light Artillery on September 18, 1861, for a period of three years. On August 26, 1862, he was captured with 19 other soldiers from the 11th IBNYA at the Second Battle of Bull Run also known as Second Manassas. During October and November 1862 he is listed with the 7th Detachment, 2nd Battalion, Paroled Prisoners, at Annapolis, Maryland. After returning to the 11th IBNYA in December 1862 he was promoted to Corporal on January 2, 1863. Corporal Shepard's unit was transferred to the Reserve Artillery and attached temporarily to Battery K, 1st New York Light Artillery. Shepard also saw action at Chancellorsville, Gettysburg and the Battle of Mine Run.

Corporal Shepard was discharged on the 7th and reenlisted on February 8, 1864, in the 11th IBNYA at Brandy Station, Va. as a veteran volunteer under General Order 191 signed June 25, 1863. He was again discharged on April 23, 1864, after petitioning the Army for a transfer to the Navy under General Order 91 of 1864.

== Navy Service ==
Enlisting in the United States Navy on April 25, 1864, at Baltimore, Maryland as an ordinary seaman, he served aboard the USS Allegheny (1847), USS Wabash (1855), USS Commodore Perry (1859) and the USS Constellation (1854).

During his service aboard the USS Wabash (1855), he participated in the landing party that assaulted Fort Fisher in Wilmington, North Carolina in January 1865. He advanced gallantly through severe enemy fire, while armed only with a revolver and cutlass, which made it impossible to return the fire at that range. Shepard succeeded in not only reaching the angle of the fort, but in being one of the few to enter it. When the rest of the men to his rear were forced to retreat due to devastating fire, Shepard was forced to withdraw and seek the shelter of one of the mounds near the stockade. Shepard then succeeded in regaining the safety of his ship.

Shepard was just 23 years old at the time. After the fall of Fort Fisher, the Confederate army evacuated its remaining forts in the Cape Fear area, and Union forces soon overtook Wilmington. Once Wilmington fell, the supply line of the Confederacy was severed, and the war soon ended.

He was later presented with the Medal of Honor in recognition of his service. Due to a Navy clerical error, his citation reads Louis; however his name was spelled Lewis. Shepard died in Danbury, Ohio.

In April 2005, Ohio Congressman Steven C. LaTourette, representing the district that contains Shepard's native Ashtabula, passed a resolution in the House honoring Shephard. The flag that was flown over the United States Capitol on April 27, 2005, was unveiled on Memorial Day 2005 during the dedication ceremony for the new Ashtabula County Veterans Memorial. VFW Post 3334 in Jefferson was instrumental on behalf of the new memorial, and for choosing to honor the valor of Louis C. Shepard.

== Medal of Honor citation ==

Rank and Organization:

Ordinary Seaman, U.S. Navy. Born: 1843, Ohio. Accredited to: Ohio. G.O. No.: 59, June 22, 1865.

Citation:

Served as seaman on board the U.S.S. Wabash in the assault on Fort Fisher, 15 January 1865. Advancing gallantly through severe enemy fire while armed only with a revolver and cutlass which made it impossible to return the fire at that range, Shepard succeeded in reaching the angle of the fort and in going on, to be one of the few who entered the fort. When the rest of the body of men to his rear were forced to retreat under a devastating fire, he was forced to withdraw through lack of support and to seek the shelter of one of the mounds near the stockade from which point he succeeded in regaining the safety of his ship.

== Medal of Honor Legion ==
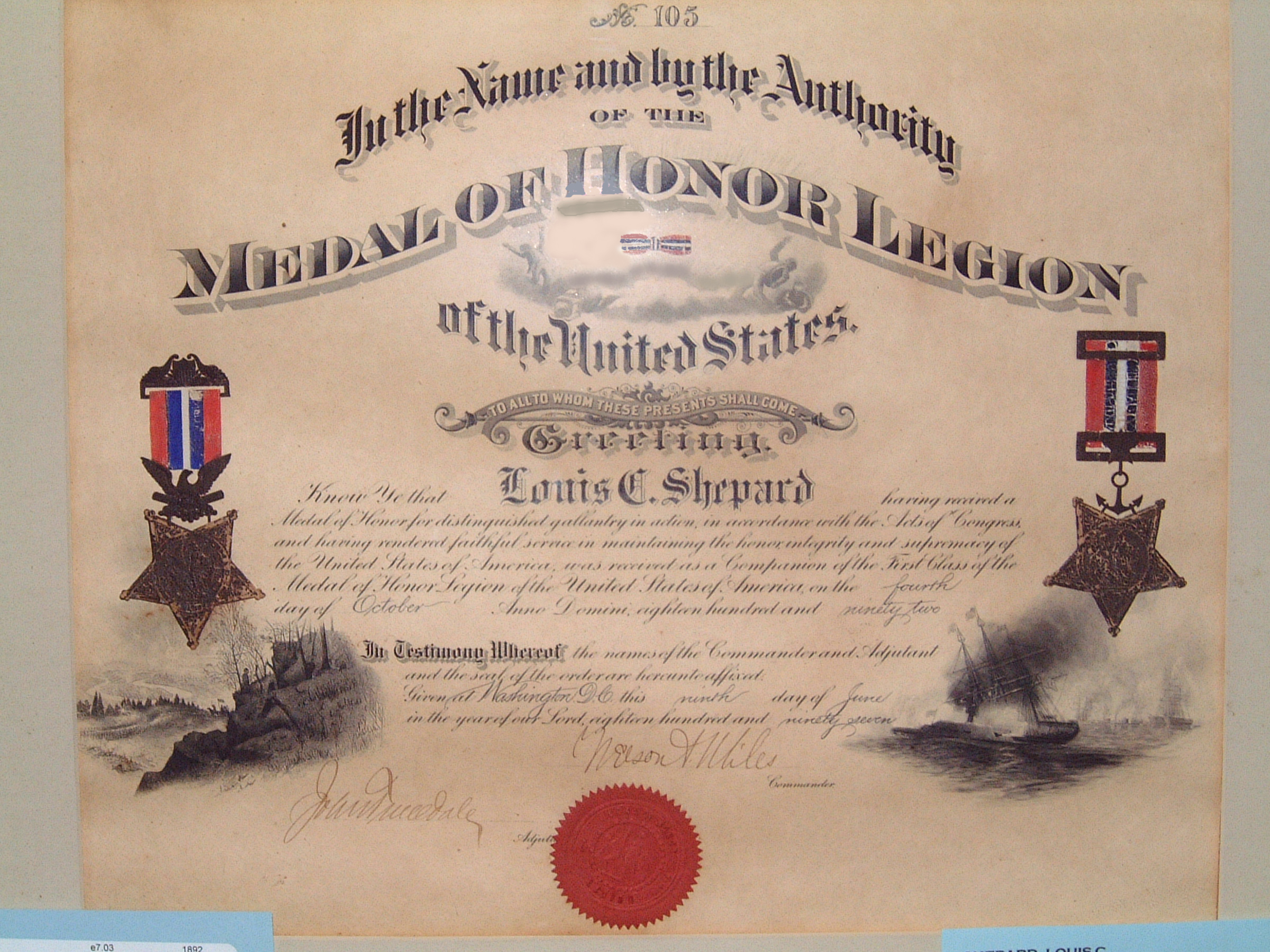
Medal of Honor Legion certificate

No. 105

In the Name and by the Authority of the Medal of Honor Legion of the United States.

To all to whom these presents shall come Greeting

Know ye that Louis C. Shepard having received a Medal of Honor for distinguished gallantry in action, in accordance with the Acts of Congress and having rendered faithful service in maintaining the honor, integrity and supremacy of the United States of America, was received as a companion of the First Class of the Medal of Honor Legion of the United States of America on the fourth day of October Anno Domine, eighteen hundred and ninety two

In Testimony Whereof the names of the Commander and Adjutant and the seal of the order are hereunto affixed. Given at Washington D.C. this ninth day of June in the year of our lord eighteen hundred and ninety seven

Nelson A. Miles Commander

John Tweedale Adjutant

== See also ==
- List of Medal of Honor recipients
- List of American Civil War Medal of Honor recipients: Q–S
