= Allen Township, Ottawa County, Ohio =

Township in Ohio, US

- Township
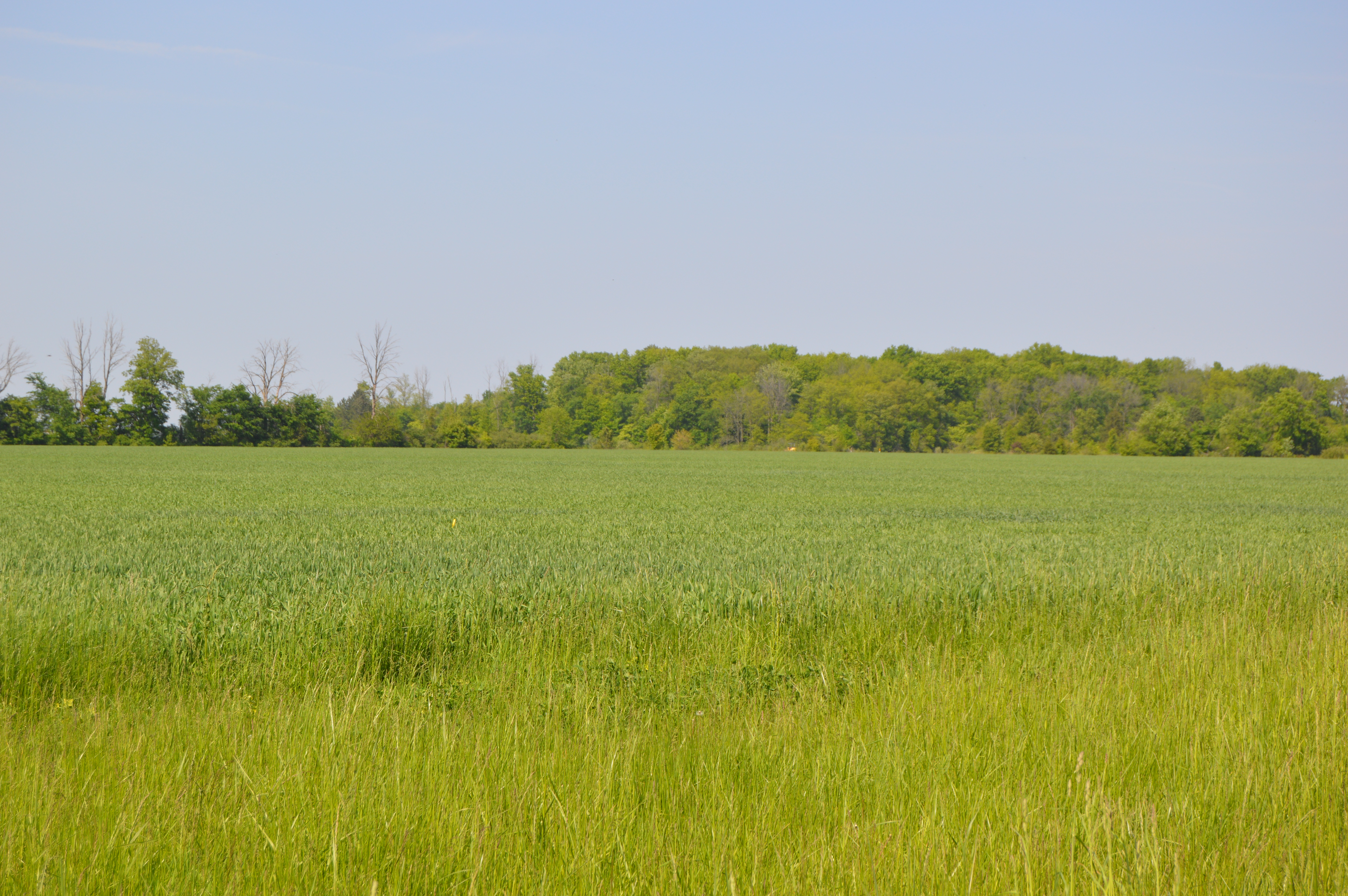
- Fields west of Clay Center

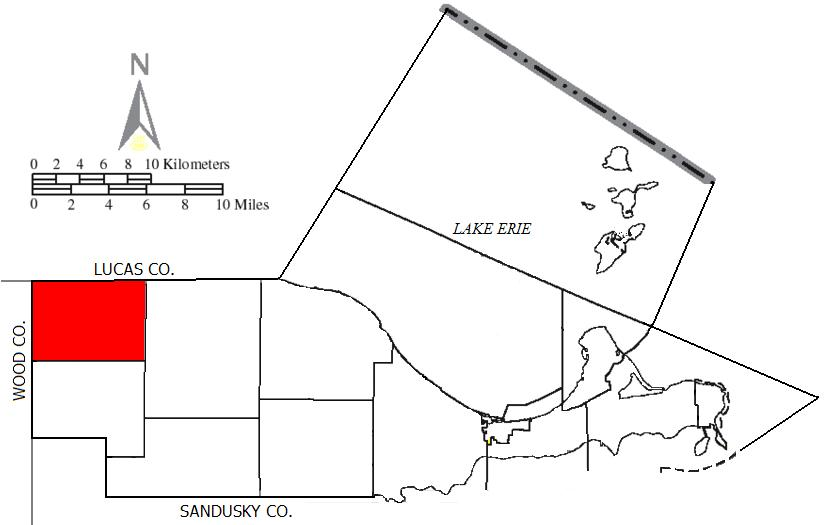
- Location of Allen Township in Ottawa County.
- Coordinates: 41°35′46″N 83°21′47″W
- Country: United States
- State: Ohio
- County: Ottawa

Area
  - Total: 25.3 sq mi (65.4 km^{2})
  - Land: 25.3 sq mi (65.4 km^{2})
  - Water: 0 sq mi (0.0 km^{2})
- Elevation: 604 ft (184 m)

Population (2020)
  - Total: 3,773
  - Density: 149/sq mi (57.7/km^{2})
- Time zone: UTC-5 (Eastern (EST))
  - Summer (DST): UTC-4 (EDT)
- FIPS code: 39-01322
- GNIS feature ID: 1086754
- Website: https://www.allentownship.us/

Allen Township is one of the twelve townships of Ottawa County, Ohio, United States. The 2020 census found 3,773 people in the township.

== Geography ==
Located in the northwestern corner of the county, it borders the following townships and cities:

- Jerusalem Township, Lucas County - north
- Benton Township - east
- Clay Township - south
- Lake Township, Wood County - west
- Northwood - northwest, south of Oregon
- Oregon - northwest, north of Northwood

The village of Clay Center is located in the southern part of the township, and the census-designated places of Curtice and Williston lie in the township's north.

== Name and history ==
Statewide, other Allen Townships are located in Darke, Hancock, and Union counties.

== Government ==
The township is governed by a three-member board of trustees, who are elected in November of odd-numbered years to a four-year term beginning on the following January 1. Two are elected in the year after the presidential election and one is elected in the year before it. There is also an elected township fiscal officer, who serves a four-year term beginning on April 1 of the year after the election, which is held in November of the year before the presidential election. Vacancies in the fiscal officership or on the board of trustees are filled by the remaining trustees.
