= Martin, Ohio =

- Unincorporated community
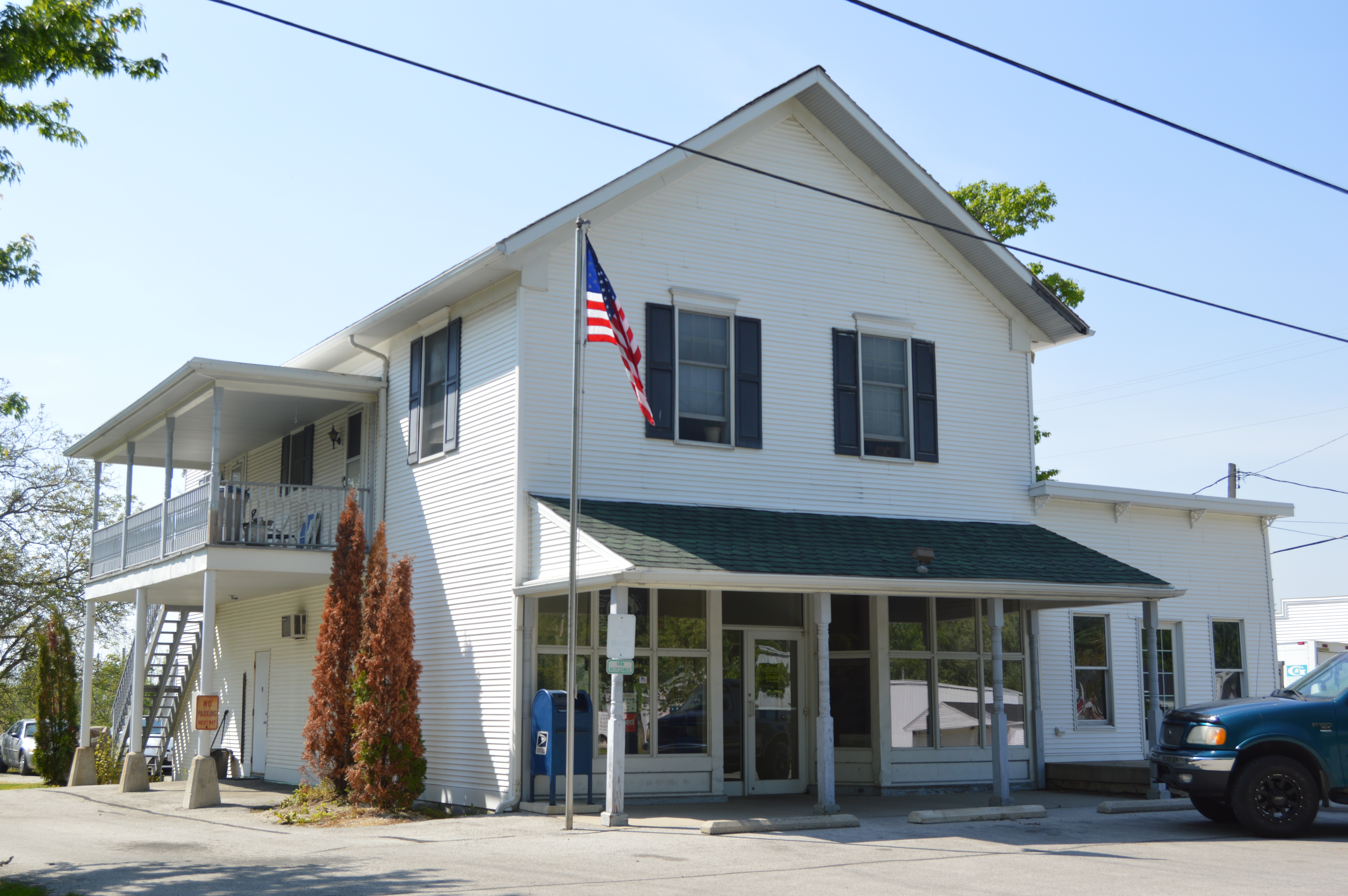
- Post office

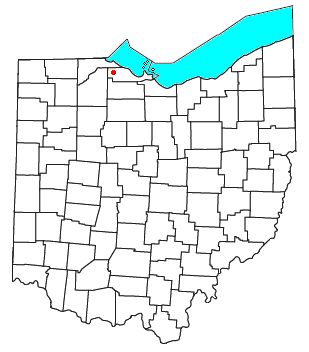
- Location of Martin, Ohio
- Coordinates: 41°33′27″N 83°20′12″W
- Country: United States
- State: Ohio
- County: Ottawa
- Township: Clay
- Elevation: 604 ft (184 m)
- Time zone: UTC-5 (Eastern (EST))
  - Summer (DST): UTC-4 (EDT)
- ZIP codes: 43445
- GNIS feature ID: 1048948

Martin is an unincorporated community in northeastern Clay Township, Ottawa County, Ohio, United States. It has a post office with the ZIP code 43445.
