= Griffing Flying Service =

Airline of the United States

Griffing Flying Service, Inc.
IATA	ICAO	Call sign
none	none	none
- Commenced operations: 1937
- Hubs: Erie-Ottawa International Airport
- Headquarters: Port Clinton, Ohio
- Website: www.flygriffing.com

Griffing Flying Service, Inc. is a privately owned aviation company based in Ottawa County, Ohio. It operates on-demand passenger flights to the Lake Erie Islands, as well as air charter services to the United States, Canada, and The Bahamas. The company also provides flight training, aerial tours and aircraft maintenance.

Griffing Flying Service is a family-operated business. Founded in 1937 by Harry Thomas Griffing, a former truck driver, by 2016 it was headed by Harry Thomas Griffing Jr., with Harry Thomas Griffing III as its chief pilot. The latter is the third generation of pilots in the family.

After seven years of negotiations, Griffing took over a rival, Island Airlines, in 1992. The deal included the rights to delivery agreements with the United States Postal Service and United Parcel Service. It had 18 employees and a fleet of eight aircraft in 2012. It then operated the 133-acre (54 ha) Griffing Sandusky Airport in Sandusky, Ohio but was preparing gradually to move its base to Erie–Ottawa International Airport in Ottawa County, where it had in any case operated during the winter since 2008. The move was completed by 2013.

In 2016, the company was named Business of the Year by the Ottawa County Improvement Corporation.

== Fleet ==
Griffing Flying Service flies a fleet of small propeller-driven airplanes, including:

Griffing Flying Service fleet
Aircraft	Total	Passengers
King Air B200	1	8
Britten-Norman Islander	1	8
Piper Saratoga	2	5
Piper Archer II	2	3
Piper Cherokee 140	1	3
