= J-bar =

J-bar may refer to:

- J with bar (Ɉ, ɉ)
- J-bar lift, an apparatus for bringing people to the top of a ski slope
- The J-Bar, a drinking establishment at the Hotel Jerome in Aspen, Colorado, USA

J-bar may also be an abbreviation for Johnson bar:

- Johnson bar (vehicle), a lever used to control some function of various vehicles
- Johnson bar (tool), a wheeled hand tool used for moving heavy objects
