= Ford Trimotor =

American three-engined transport aircraft

Trimotor
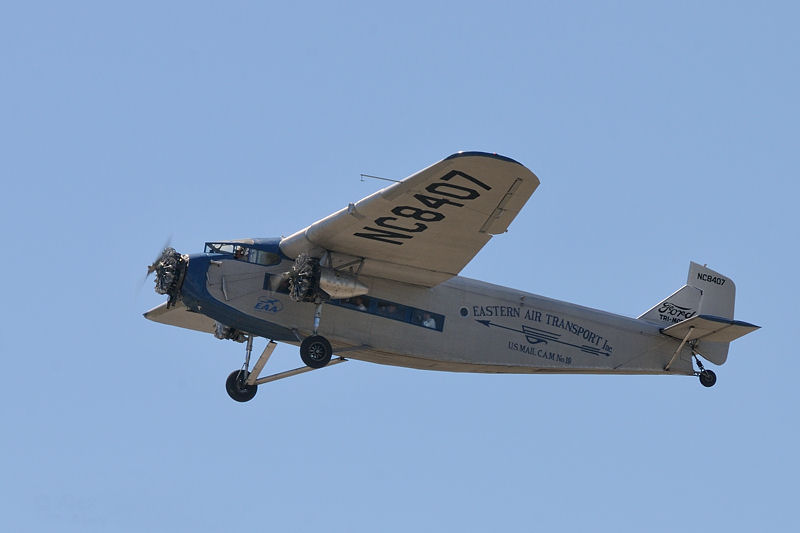
- Experimental Aircraft Association (EAA) - Oshkosh. Ford 4-AT-E Trimotor (2014)

General information
- Type: Transport aircraft
- Manufacturer: Stout Metal Airplane Division of the Ford Motor Company
- Designer: William Bushnell Stout
- Status: Limited excursion service
- Primary users: about 100 airlines United States Army Air Corps; United States Navy; Royal Canadian Air Force
- Number built: 199

History
- Introduction date: 1926
- First flight: June 11, 1926
- Variant: Stout Bushmaster 2000

The Ford Trimotor (also called the "Tri-Motor", and nicknamed the "Tin Goose") is an American three-engined transport aircraft. It made its first flight on June 11, 1926. Production started in 1925 by the companies of Henry Ford and ended on June 7, 1933, after 199 had been made. It was designed for the civil aviation market, but also saw service with military units.

== Design and development ==
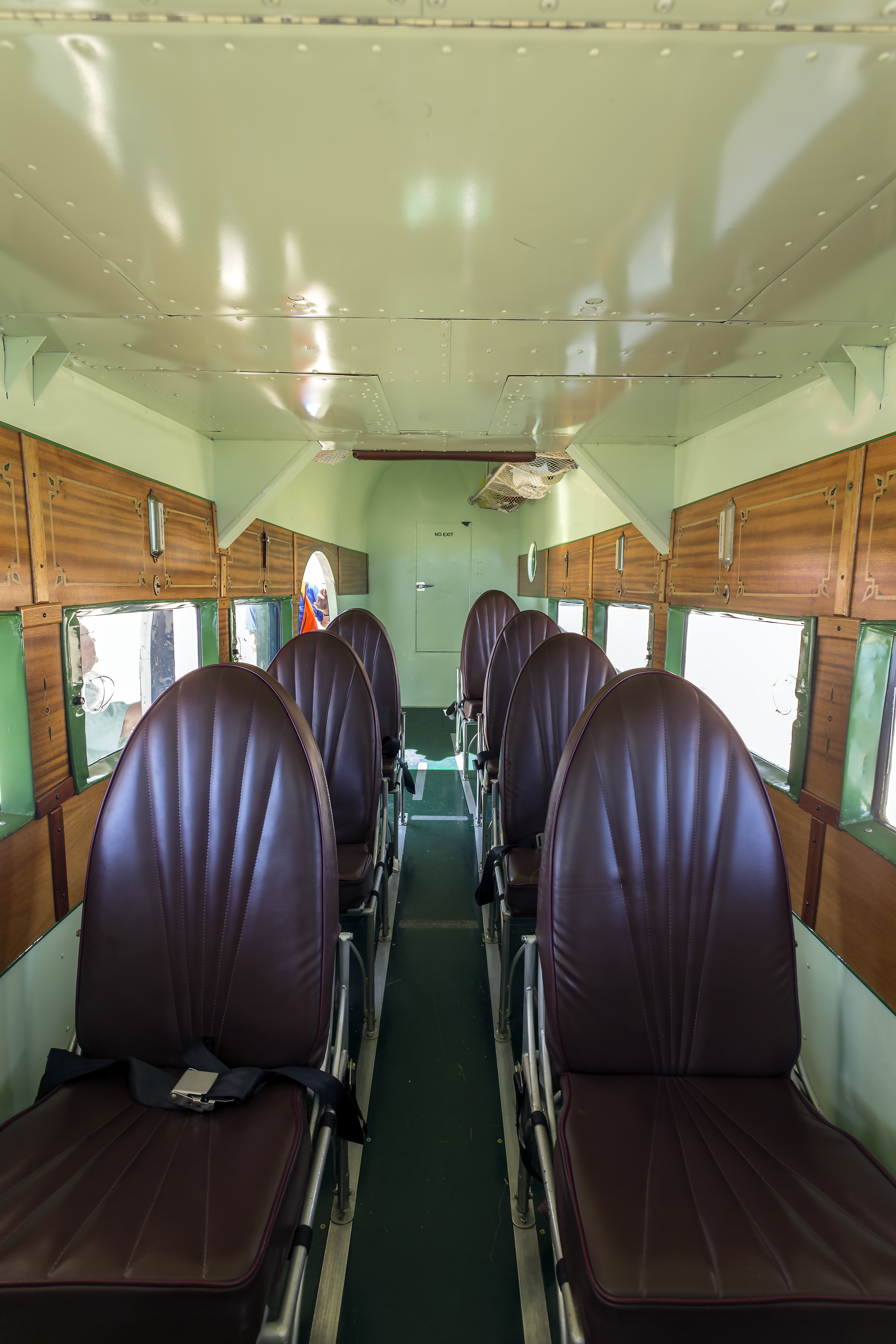
Modernized Ford Trimotor interior

In the early 1920s, Henry Ford, along with a group of 19 others including his son Edsel, invested in the Stout Metal Airplane Company. Stout, a bold and imaginative salesman, sent a mimeographed form letter to leading manufacturers, blithely asking for $1,000 with the line, "For your one thousand dollars you will get one definite promise: You will never get your money back" to convince them. Stout raised $20,000, including $1,000 each from Edsel and Henry Ford.

In 1925, Ford bought Stout and its aircraft designs. The single-engined Stout monoplane was turned into a trimotor, the Stout 3-AT with three Curtiss-Wright air-cooled radial engines. After a prototype was built and test-flown with poor results, the "4-AT" and "5-AT" emerged.

The Ford Trimotor using all-metal construction was not a revolutionary concept, but it was certainly more advanced than the standard construction techniques of the 1920s. The aircraft resembled the Fokker F.VII Trimotor (except for being all metal which Henry Ford claimed made it "the safest airliner around"). Its fuselage and wings followed a design pioneered by Junkers during World War I with the Junkers J.I and used postwar in a series of airliners starting with the Junkers F.13 low-wing monoplane of 1920 of which a number were exported to the US, the Junkers K 16 high-wing airliner of 1921, and the Junkers G 24 trimotor of 1924. All of these were constructed of aluminum alloy, which was corrugated for added stiffness, although the resulting drag reduced its overall performance. So similar were the designs that Junkers sued and won when Ford attempted to export an aircraft to Europe. In 1930, Ford countersued in Prague, and despite the possibility of anti-German sentiment, was decisively defeated a second time, with the court finding that Ford had infringed upon Junkers' patents.

Although designed primarily for passenger use, the Trimotor could be easily adapted for hauling cargo, since its seats in the fuselage could be removed. To increase cargo capacity, one unusual feature was the provision of "drop-down" cargo holds below the lower inner wing sections of the 5-AT version.

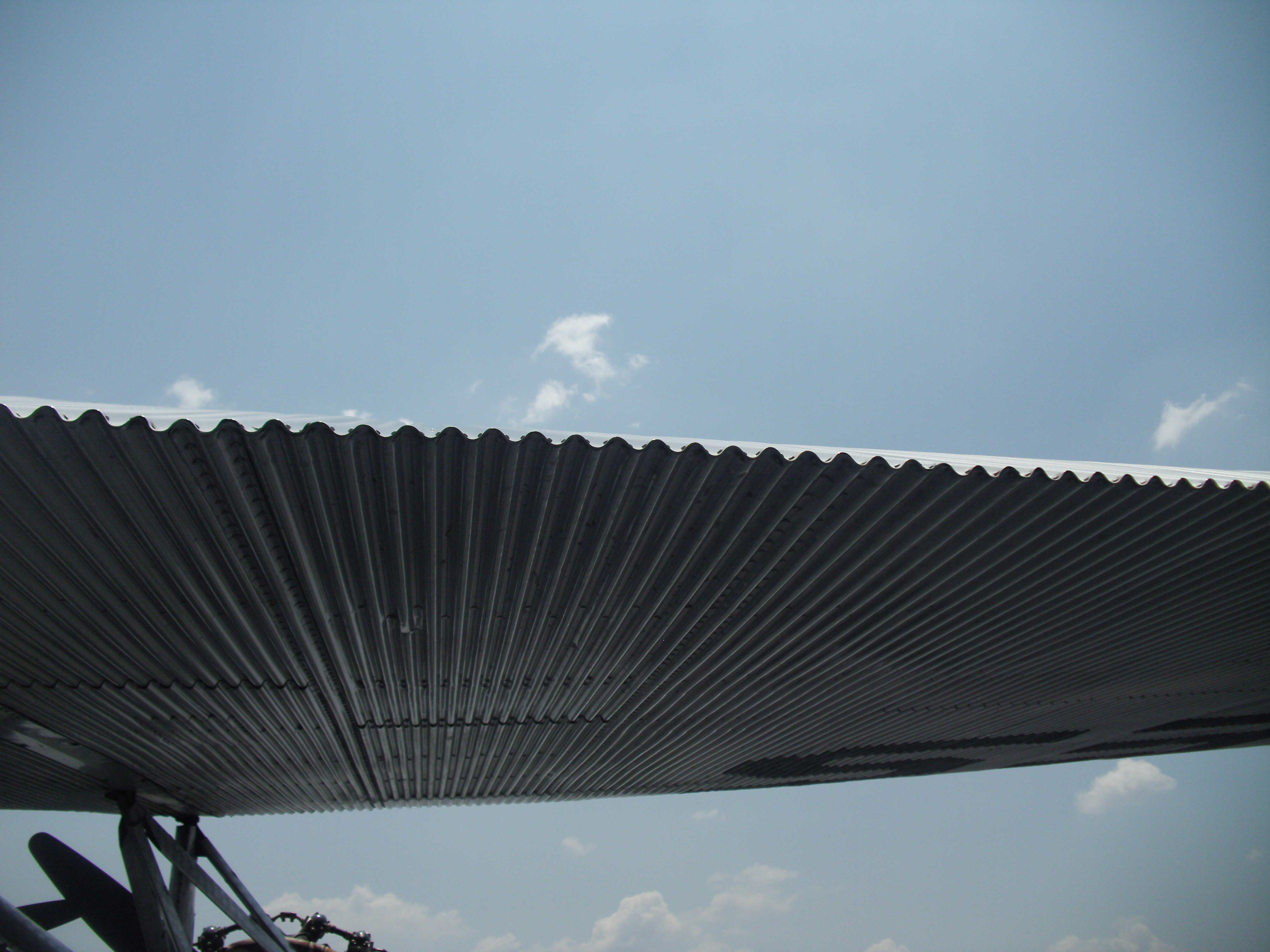
Corrugated wing of a 1929 Ford 4-AT-E Trimotor

One 4-AT with Wright J-4 200-hp engines was built for the U.S. Army Air Corps as the C-3, and seven with Wright R-790-3 (235 hp) as C-3As. The latter were upgraded to Wright R-975-1 (J6-9) radials at 300 hp and redesignated C-9. Five 5-ATs were built as C-4s or C-4As.

The original (commercial production) 4-AT had three air-cooled Wright radial engines. It carried a crew of three: a pilot, a copilot, and a stewardess, as well as eight or nine passengers (Note: Up to 12 passengers could be accommodated in special configurations.). The later 5-AT had more powerful Pratt & Whitney engines. All models had an aluminum corrugated sheet-metal body and wings. Unlike many aircraft of this era, extending through World War II, its control surfaces (ailerons, elevators, and rudders) were not fabric covered, but were also made of corrugated metal. As was common for the time, its rudder and elevators were actuated by metal cables that were strung along the external surface of the aircraft. Engine gauges were also mounted externally, on the engines, to be read by the pilot while looking through the aircraft windshield. Another interesting feature was the use of the hand-operated "Johnny brake."

Like Ford cars and tractors, these Ford aircraft were well designed, relatively inexpensive, and reliable (for the era). The combination of a metal structure and simple systems led to their reputation for ruggedness. Rudimentary service could be accomplished "in the field" with ground crews able to work on engines using scaffolding and platforms. To fly into otherwise-inaccessible sites, the Ford Trimotor could be fitted with skis or floats.

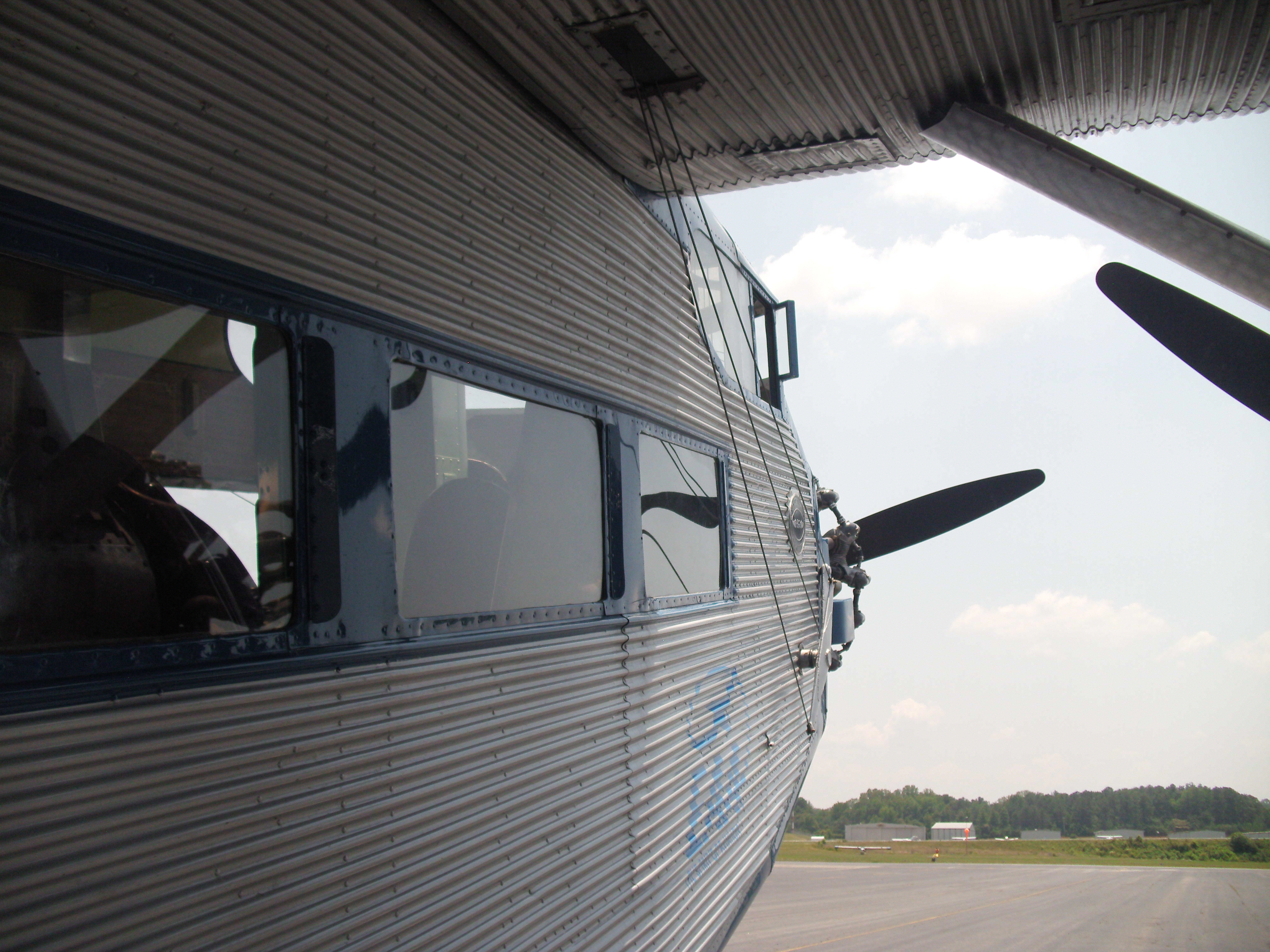
Externally mounted control wires of a Ford Trimotor

The rapid development of aircraft at this time (the vastly superior Boeing 247 first flew at start of 1933), along with the death of his personal pilot, Harry J. Brooks, on a test flight, led to Ford losing interest in aviation. While he did not make a profit on its aircraft business, Ford's reputation lent credibility to the infant aviation and airline industries, and he helped introduce many aspects of the modern aviation infrastructure, including paved runways, passenger terminals, hangars, airmail, and radio navigation. (Note: Note: The 28-page booklet, The Amazing Story of America's Oldest Flying Airliner, describes the history of the Ford Trimotor 4-AT-10, C-1077, also known as G-CARC "Niagara". It also describes the restoration process and some general history of Ford's Trimotor, as well as his aviation enterprises.)

In the late 1920s, the Ford Aircraft Division was reputedly the "largest manufacturer of commercial airplanes in the world." Alongside the Ford Trimotor, a new single-seat commuter aircraft, the Ford Flivver or "Sky Flivver" had been designed and flown in prototype form, but never entered series production. The Trimotor was not to be Ford's last venture in aircraft production. During World War II, the largest aircraft manufacturing plant in the world was built at the Willow Run, Michigan plant, where Ford produced thousands of B-24 Liberator bombers under license from Consolidated Aircraft.

William Stout left the Metal Airplane division of the Ford Motor Company in 1930. He continued to operate the Stout Engineering Laboratory, producing various aircraft. In 1954, Stout purchased the rights to the Ford Trimotor in an attempt to produce new examples. A new company formed from this effort brought back two modern examples of the trimotor aircraft, renamed the Stout Bushmaster 2000, but even with improvements that had been incorporated, performance was judged inferior to modern designs.

== Operational history ==
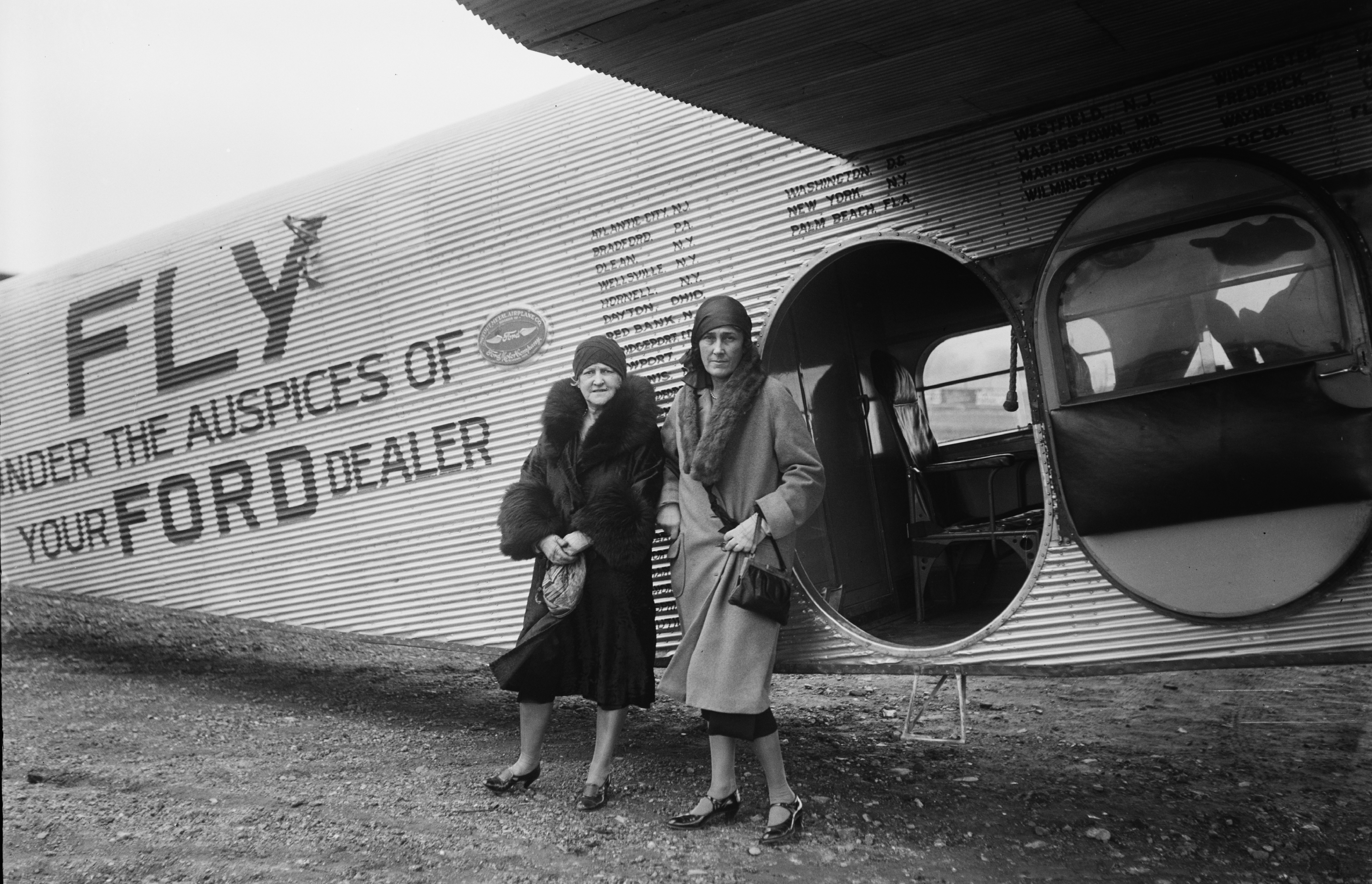
Two women standing at the door of a Trimotor at Washington National Airport in 1930

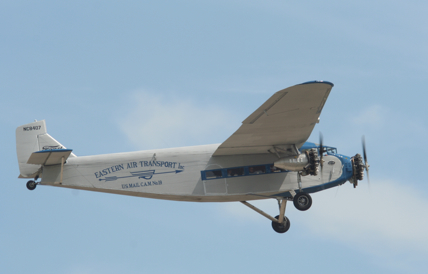
Restored 1929 Ford 4-AT-E Trimotor "NC8407" owned by the Experimental Aircraft Association (EAA) and painted in the colors of Eastern Air Transport

Production ran from 1926 and 1933 and 199 were built, including 79 4-ATs, and 117 5-ATs, plus some experimental craft. Well over 100 airlines of the world flew the Ford Trimotor. From mid-1927, the type was also flown on executive transportation duties by several commercial nonairline operators, including oil and manufacturing companies.

The impact of the Ford Trimotor on commercial aviation was immediate, as the design represented a "quantum leap over other airliners." Within a few months of its introduction, Transcontinental Air Transport was created to provide coast-to-coast operation, capitalizing on the Trimotor's ability to provide reliable and, for the time, comfortable passenger service. While advertised as a transcontinental service, the airline had to rely on rail connections with a deluxe Pullman train that would be based in New York being the first part of the journey. Passengers then met a Trimotor in Port Columbus, Ohio, that would begin a hop across the continent ending at Waynoka, Oklahoma, where another train would take the passengers to Clovis, New Mexico, where the final journey would begin, again on a Trimotor, to end up at the Grand Central Air Terminal in Glendale, a few miles northeast of Los Angeles. This demanding trip would be available for only a year before Transcontinental was merged into a combine with Western Air Service.

Ford Trimotors were also used extensively by Pan American Airways, for its first international scheduled flights from Key West to Havana, Cuba, in 1927. Eventually, Pan American extended service from North America and Cuba into Central and South America in the late 1920s and early 1930s. One of Latin America's earliest airlines, Cubana de Aviación, was the first to use the Ford Trimotor in Latin America, starting in 1930, for its domestic services.

The heyday for Ford's transport was relatively brief, lasting only until 1933, when more modern airliners began to appear. Rather than completely disappearing, the Trimotors gained an enviable reputation for durability with Ford ads in 1929 proclaiming, "No Ford plane has yet worn out in service." First being relegated to second- and third-tier airlines, the Trimotors continued to fly into the 1960s, with numerous examples being converted into cargo transports to further lengthen their careers, and when World War II began, the commercial versions were soon modified for military applications.

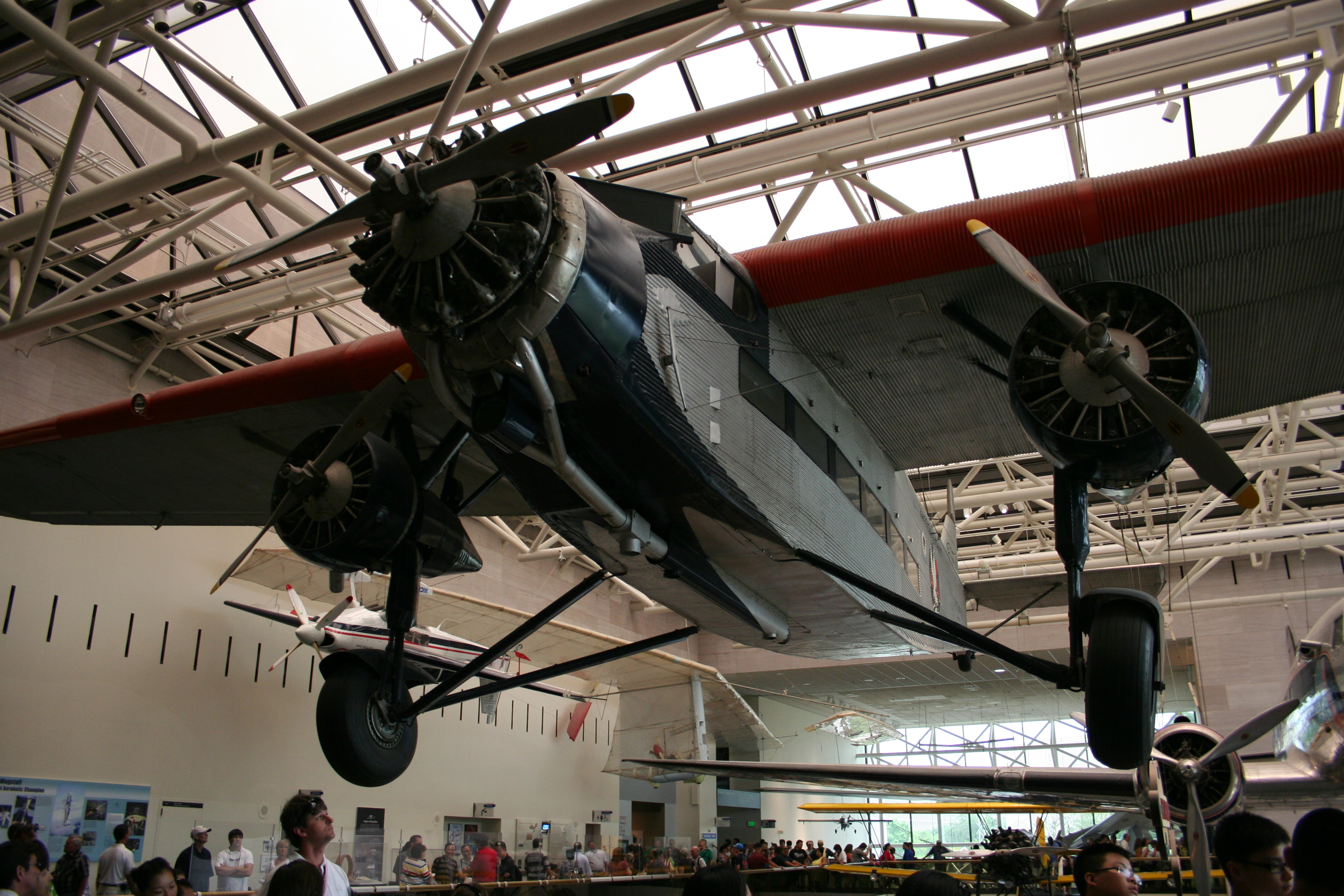
On display in The Smithsonian's National Air and Space Museum in Washington, D.C.

Some of the significant flights made by the Ford Trimotor in this period greatly enhanced the reputation of the type for strength and reliability. One example was Ford 4-AT Trimotor serial number 10, built in 1927. It flew in the United States and Mexico under registration number C-1077, and for several years in Canada under registration G-CARC. It had many notable accomplishments; it was flown by Charles Lindbergh and Amelia Earhart, among many others. It made the first commercial flight from the United States to Mexico City, as well as the first commercial flight over the Canadian Rockies. After damage on landing in 1936, it was grounded and remained for decades at Carcross, Yukon. In 1956, the wreck was salvaged and preserved, and in the mid-1980s, Greg Herrick took over C-1077 and began restoring it. As of 2006, C-1077 is in flying condition again, restored to its December 1927 appearance.

On November 27 and 28, 1929, Commander Richard E. Byrd (navigator), chief pilot Bernt Balchen, and two other crewmen, the copilot and the photographer, made the first flight above the geographic South Pole in a Ford Trimotor that Byrd named the Floyd Bennett. This was one of three aircraft taken on this polar expedition, with the other two being named The Stars and Stripes and The Virginian, replacing the Fokker Trimotors that Byrd previously used.

In February 1930, a Ford Trimotor was used for the flight of Elm Farm Ollie, the first cow to fly in an aircraft and to be milked mid-flight.

Franklin Roosevelt flew aboard a Ford Trimotor in 1932 during his presidential campaign in one of the first uses of an aircraft in an election, replacing the traditional "whistle stop" train trips.

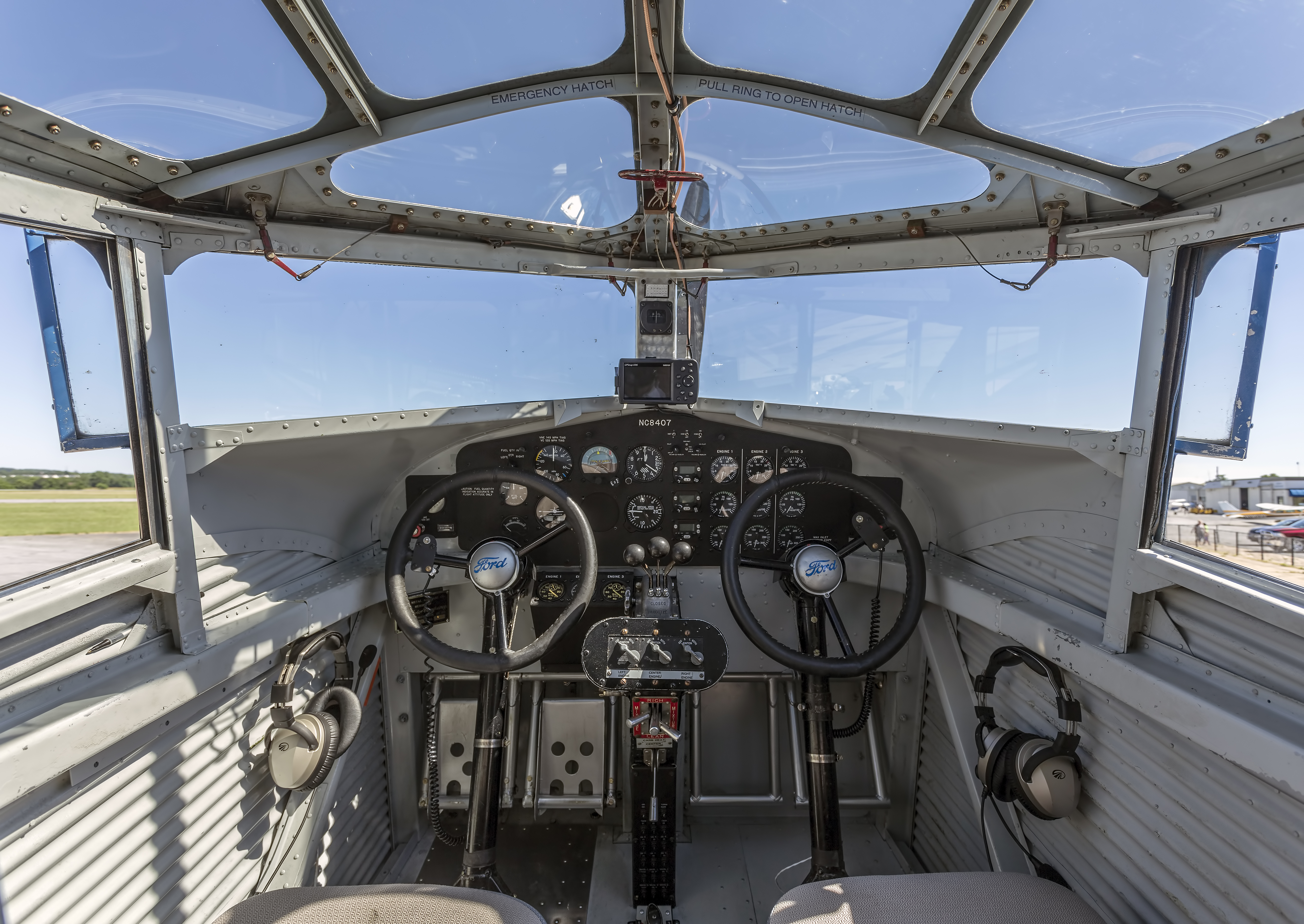
The cockpit of NC-8407

A Ford Trimotor was used in a search for the lost flyers of the Sigizmund Levanevsky trans-polar flight in 1937. Movie stunt flyer Jimmie Mattern flew a specially modified Lockheed Electra along with fellow movie flyer, Garland Lincoln, flying a stripped-down Trimotor donated by the president of Superior Oil Company. With 1,800 gallons of avgas and 450 gallons of oil in the modified cabin, the Trimotor was intended to act as a "tanker" for the expedition. The Electra was able to transfer fuel in the air from the Trimotor, through a hose cast out the 4-AT's door. With the first aerial refueling test successful, the pair of pilots set out for Fairbanks, landing first at Burwash Landing, Yukon Territory, Canada, on August 15, 1937, but the Trimotor ran out of fuel and crashed in inclement weather the following day. The Trimotor was abandoned on the tundra.

One of the major uses of the Trimotor after it was superseded as a passenger aircraft by more modern aircraft like the Boeing 247 (1933) or the Douglas DC-2 (1934), then DC-3, was the carrying of heavy freight to mining operations in jungles and mountains. The Trimotor was employed for decades in this role.

In 1942, during the Battle of Bataan, a Trimotor was used in evacuations. The aircraft would haul 24 people nearly 500 miles a trip, twice daily. The aircraft was eventually strafed and destroyed by Japanese aircraft.

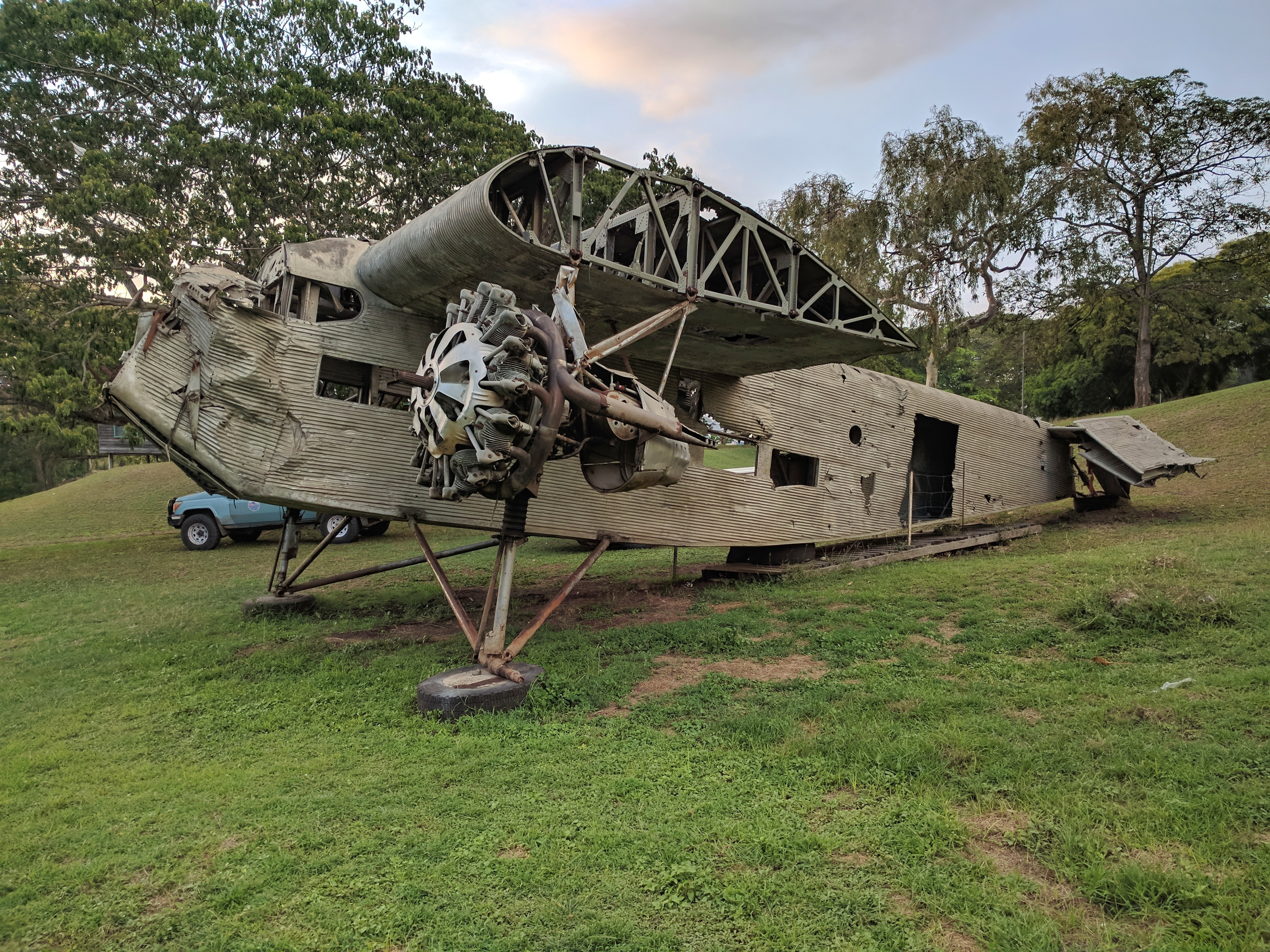
Former Royal Australian Air Force (33 Squadron) Ford 5-AT-C A45-1 displayed at the Papua New Guinea National Museum and Art Gallery, Port Moresby

In postwar years, the Ford Trimotors continued in limited service with small, regional air carriers. Scenic Airways Ford Trimotor N414H was used for 65 years as a sightseeing aircraft flying over the Grand Canyon.

== Variants ==
=== Ford designations ===
2-AT Pullman
Stout's monoplane with a single 400 hp (300 kW) Liberty L-12 V-12 engine, developed into 3-AT. 11 Built.
3-AT
Stout's tri-motor prototype with three 200 hp (150 kW) Wright J-4 Whirlwind radial engines. Outboard engines on wings, and nose engine mounted very low. One built.
4-AT
Prototype with three 200 hp (150 kW) J-4 Whirlwinds, with outer engines below wings. Two pilots in open cockpit, and eight passengers given half-round windows. One built.
4-AT-A
Production enclosed-cockpit version with rectangular windows with top corners rounded. 14 built.
4-AT-B
4-AT-A with three 220 hp (160 kW) Wright J-5 Whirlwind radials. Carried 12 passengers. 39 built.
4-AT-C
4-AT-B with nose engine replaced by a 400 hp (300 kW) Pratt & Whitney R-1340 Wasp radial. One built.
4-AT-D
4-AT-B with lengthened 78 ft 0 in (23.77 m) wings and fitted with various engines and other minor modifications. One built and two modified.
4-AT-E
4-AT-B with three 300 hp (220 kW) Wright J-6-9 Whirlwind nine-cylinder radials. 24 built with rectangular windows as used on 5-AT-A.
4-AT-F
4-AT-E but stressed for higher loads. One built.
5-AT-A
4-AT-E with longer 77 ft 10 in (23.72 m) wing and fuselage with an extra window on each side, powered by three 420 hp (310 kW) Wasps. Carried 13 passengers. Three built.

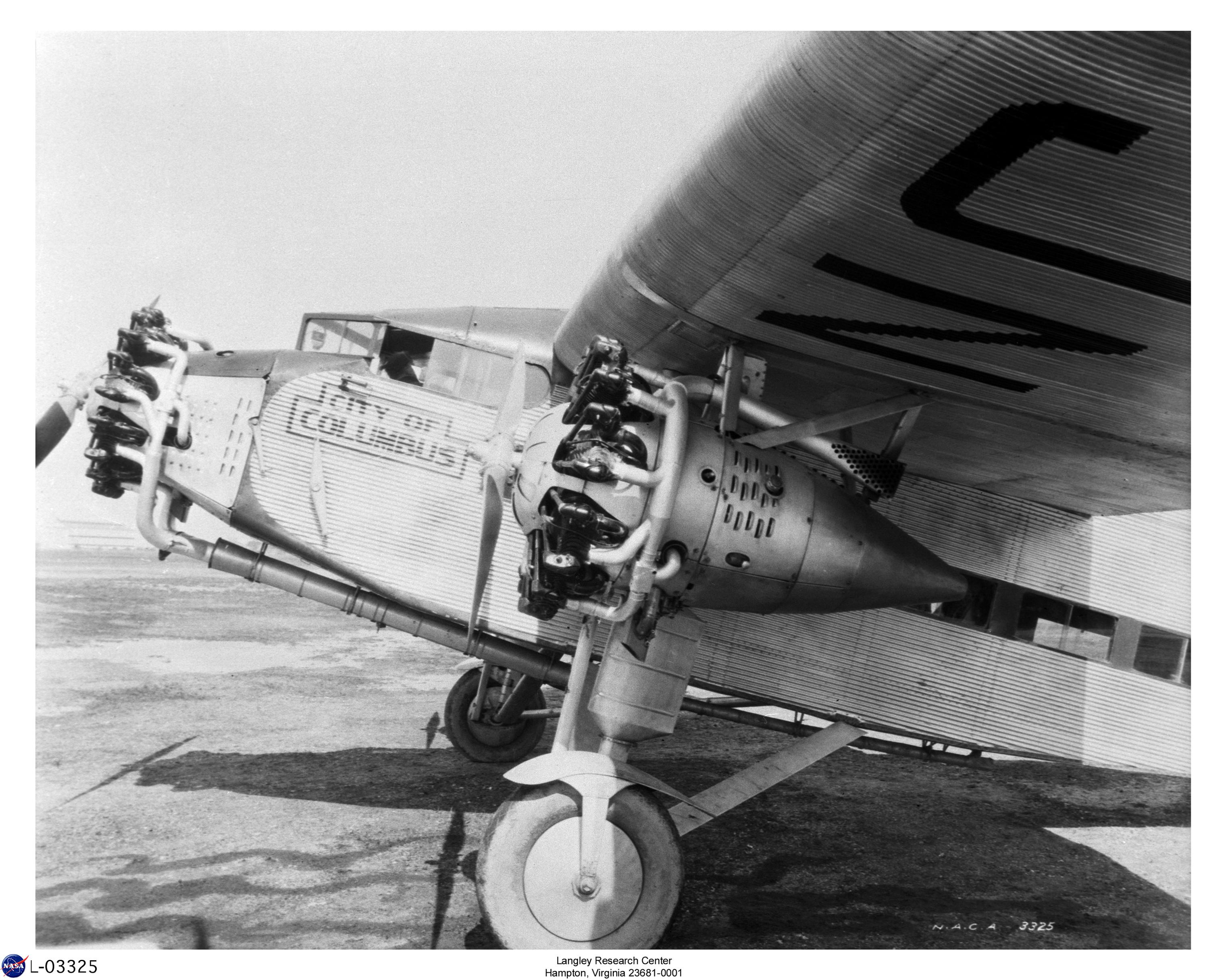
TAT Ford 5-AT-B flown by Lindbergh

5-AT-B
5-AT-A powered by 420 hp (310 kW) Wasp C-1 or SC-1 radials. Carried 15 passengers. 41 built.
5-AT-C
Improved version with engine cowlings and wheel pants, similar to the Ford 5-AT-A. Carried 17 passengers. 51 built.
5-AT-CS
5-AT-C floatplane with twin Edo floats. One built.
5-AT-D
Wings 8 in (20 cm) higher for taller cabin, and weights increased. Powered by three 450 hp (340 kW) Wasp SC radials. 20 built.
5-AT-DS
5-AT-D floatplane with Edo floats. One built.
5-AT-E
Version with outboard engines moved to wing leading edges. One 5-AT-C modified for tests, but converted back.
6-AT-A
Economy 5-AT-A with reduced power, load and performance. Three 300 hp (220 kW) Wright J-6-9 Whirlwind radials. Three built.
6-AT-AS
6-AT-A floatplane with Edo floats. One modified.
7-AT-A
6-AT-A with 420 hp (310 kW) Pratt & Whitney Wasp radial in the nose.
8-AT
5-AT-C converted to single-engine freighter. Six different engines ranging from 575 to 700 hp (429 to 522 kW) installed. One built.
9-AT
4-AT-B with three 300 hp (220 kW) Pratt & Whitney R-985 Wasp Junior radial engines. One built.
10-AT
Project for larger aircraft with two engines above fuselage and two on wings. None built but developed into 12-AT and built as 14-A as a trimotor.
11-AT
4-AT-E with three 225 hp (168 kW) Packard DR-980 Diesel radial engines. One built.
12-AT
Project, development of 10-AT, not built.
13-A
5-AT-D with two 300 hp (220 kW) Wright J-6-9 Whirlwind radials, and a 575 hp (429 kW) Wright Cyclone radial in the nose. 1 built.

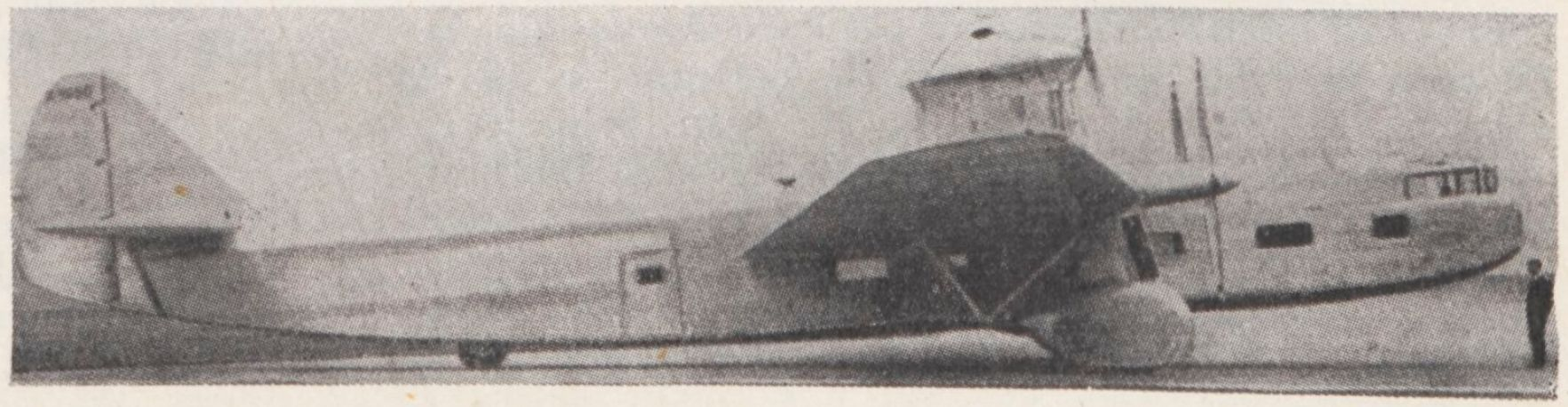
Ford 14-A photo from L'Aerophile May 1932

14-A
Similar to 10-AT and 12-AT, 1 built but not flown, was to have carried 32 passengers.

=== United States military designations ===
==== United States Army Air Corps ====
XC-3
One 4-AT-A evaluated by the USAAC.
C-3
4-AT-A redesignated from XC-3 following evaluation
C-3A
4-AT-E with three 235 hp (175 kW) Wright R-790-3 Whirlwind radials. Seven built, all converted to C-9 standard.
C-4
One 4-AT-B for evaluation.

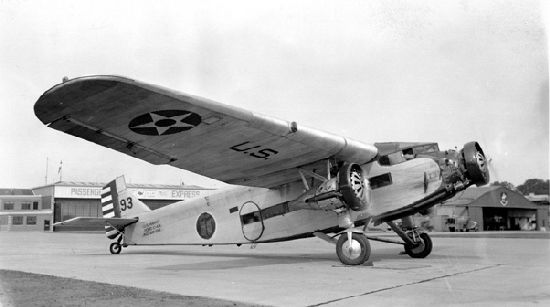
Ford C-4A

C-4A
5-AT-D, with three 450 hp (340 kW) Pratt & Whitney R-1340-11 Wasp radials. Four built
C-4B
Single C-4A re-engined with three 450 hp (340 kW) R-1340-7 Wasps.
C-9
Redesignation of C-3As fitted with 300 hp (220 kW) Wright R-975-1 Whirlwind radials
XB-906
5-AT-D modified into bomber with three 500 hp (370 kW) Wasps for United States Army Air Corps. One built.

==== US Navy and US Marines ====
XJR-1
One 4-AT-A evaluated by the United States Navy
JR-2
U.S. Marine Corps 4-AT-E transport, with three Wright J-6-9 engines. Two built, redesignated RR-2 in 1931.
JR-3
5-AT-C for U.S. Navy (one) and U.S. Marine Corps (two). Three built.

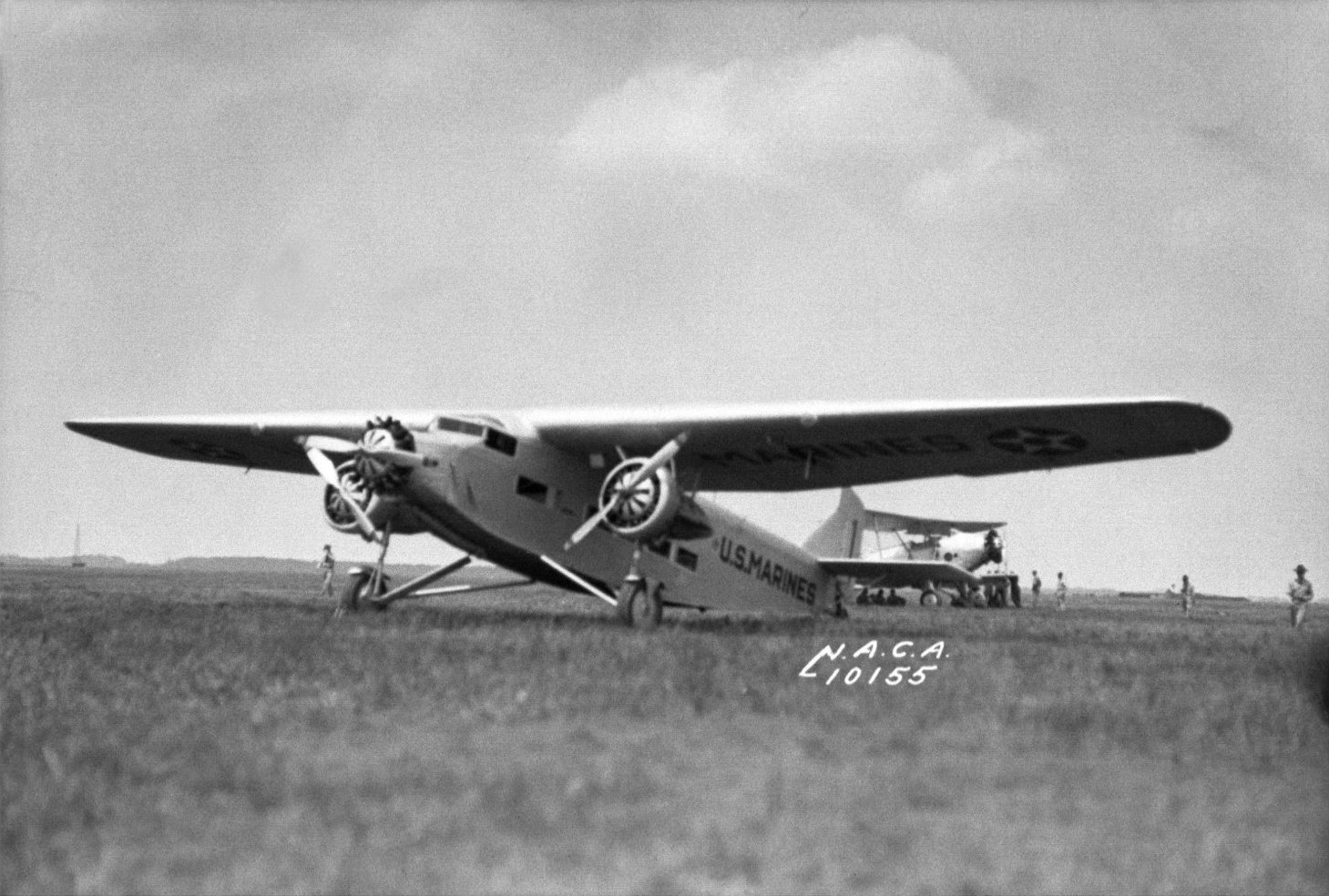
Ford RR-1 at Langley, Virginia 1934

RR-1
XJR-1 redesignated in 1931.
RR-2
JR-2 redesignated in 1931.
RR-3
JR-3 redesignated in 1931.
RR-4
Single 5-AT-C for Navy.
RR-5
4-AT-Ds, one each for the U.S. Navy and U.S. Marines.

== Operators ==
=== Civil operators ===
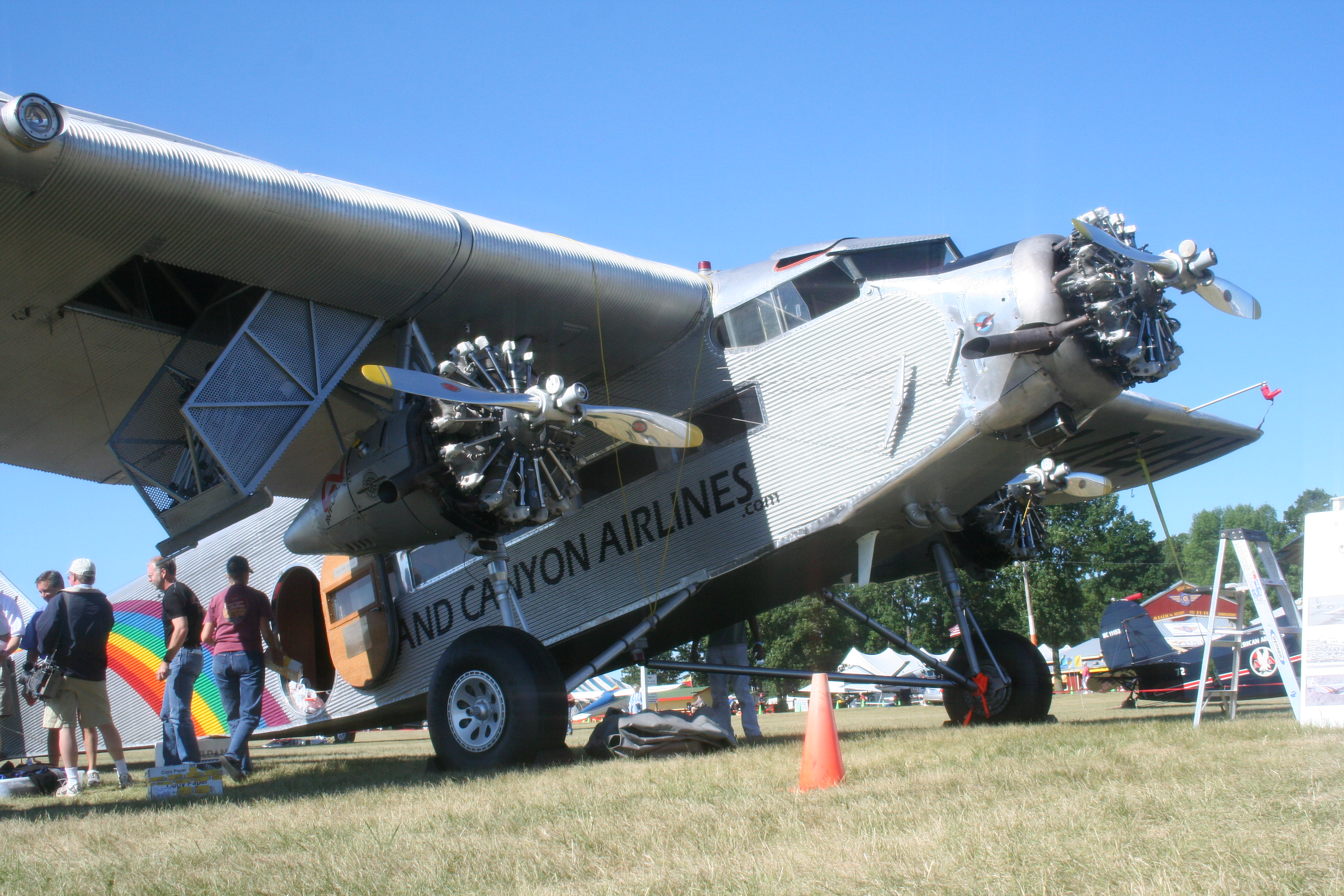
Grand Canyon Airlines Ford Trimotor with wing baggage compartment open

Chile

- LAN-Chile (Línea Aérea Nacional-Chile), three examples.

Colombia

- SACO
- SCADTA

Canada

- BYN Co.(British Yukon Navigation Company) CF-AZB flew in the Yukon from April 1936 until damaged in August 1940.

Republic of China

- China National Aviation Corporation (CNAC) operated at least three 5-ATs

Cuba

- Cubana

Czechoslovakia

- Czechoslovak Airlines

Dominican Republic

- Dominicana de Aviación, Dominican Republic airline flew Ford Trimotors in the early 1930s.

Mexico

- Mexicana

Spain

- First CLASSA, then LAPE, after Iberia

USA

- American Airways
- Eastern Air Transport
- Grand Canyon Airlines
- Island Airlines, Bass Islands, Ohio
- Maddux Air Lines
- Northwest Airways
- Pan American Airways
- Southwest Air Fast Express (S.A.F.E.way)
- Star Air Service
- Texaco
- Transcontinental Air Transport
- Transcontinental & Western Air (TWA)
- United Air Lines
- Wien Air Alaska

Venezuela

- AVENSA

=== Military operators ===
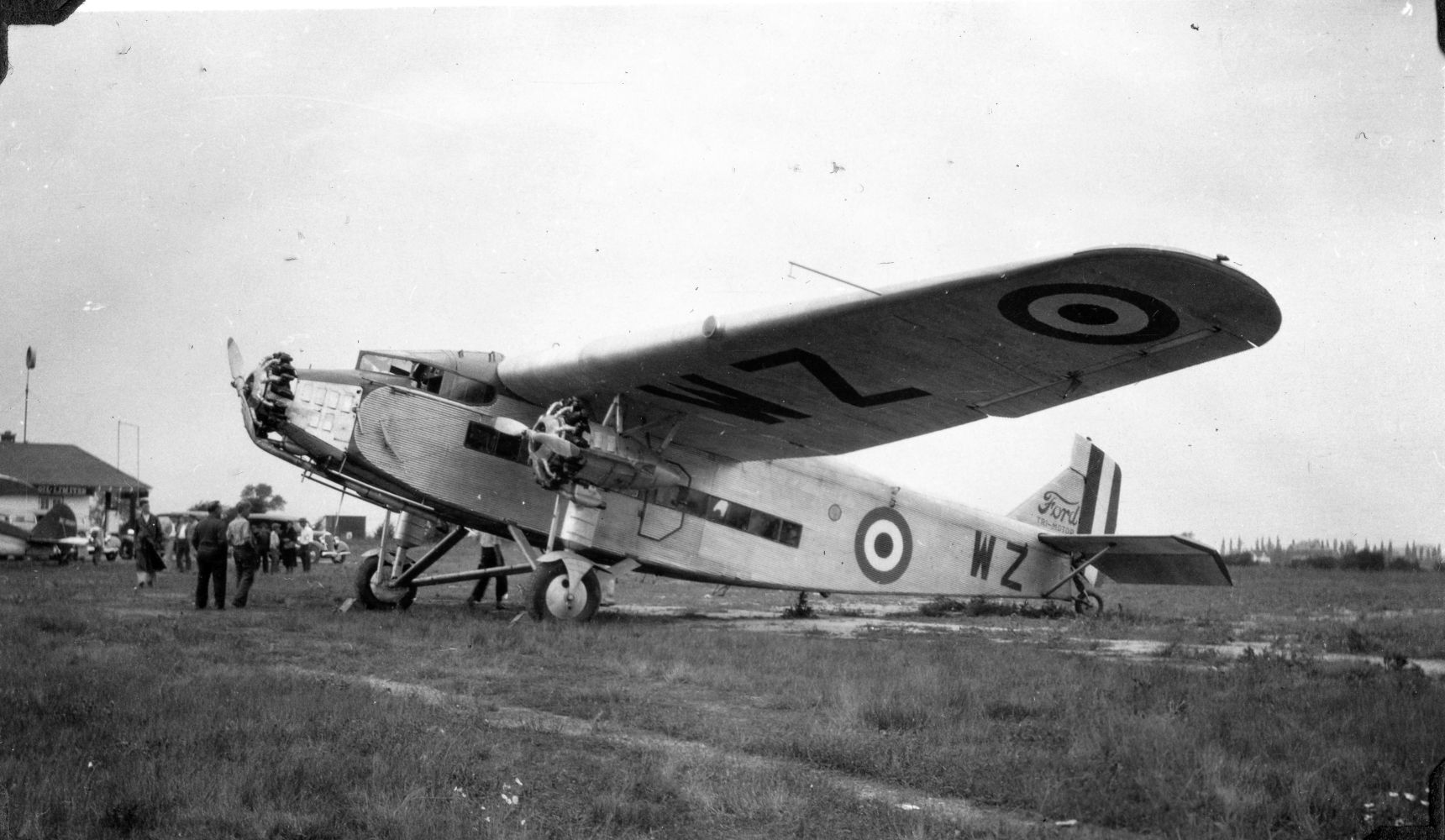
Royal Canadian Air Force Ford 6-AT-A G-CYWZ

Australia

- Royal Australian Air Force
  - No. 24 Squadron RAAF

Canada

- Royal Canadian Air Force operated a single 6-AT-A/6-AT-AS.

Colombia

- Colombian Air Force

Spain

- Spanish Republican Air Force

United Kingdom

- Royal Air Force
  - No. 271 Squadron RAF operated a single 5-AT-D during 1940.

USA

- United States Army Air Corps
- United States Marine Corps
- United States Navy

== Accidents and incidents ==
- On March 17, 1929, a Colonial Western Airways 4-AT-B Tri-Motor, NC7683, suffered a double engine failure during its initial climb after takeoff from Newark Airport in Newark, New Jersey. It failed to gain height and crashed into a railroad freight car loaded with sand, killing 14 of the 15 people on board the aircraft. At the time, it was the deadliest airplane accident in American history. In addition, the surviving pilot also became the earliest known sole survivor of a commercial aircraft accident.
- On April 21, 1929, a Maddux Air Lines 5-AT-B Tri-Motor, NC9636, collided with a United States Army Air Service (USAAS) Boeing PW-9D fighter, 28-037, over San Diego; all six on board both aircraft died. The pilot of the Boeing PW-9D was performing stunts and then attempted to pass in front of the airliner, but misjudged the speed of the Maddux aircraft and his aircraft struck the cockpit of the Ford Tri-Motor.
- On September 3, 1929, a Transcontinental Air Transport 5-AT-B Tri-Motor, NC9649, named City of San Francisco, crashed into Mount Taylor near Grants, New Mexico in a thunderstorm; all eight people on board died.
- On January 19, 1930, a Maddux Air Lines 5-AT-C Tri-Motor, NC9689, operating as Flight 7, crashed near Oceanside, California due to adverse weather conditions, killing all 16 on board.
- On August 22, 1930, a ČSA Československé Aerolinie Ford 5-AT-C Tri-Motor, OK-FOR, hit the ground in poor visibility after a sharp turn to avoid a chimney and caught fire, in an attempt to stay clear of a thunderstorm, killing 12 of 13 on board.
- On January 24, 1933, a Pacific Air Transport Ford Trimotor on a cargo flight crashed on takeoff, killing 2 of the 3 occupants on board.
- On June 24, 1935, Tri-Motor 5-AT-B of SACO Servicio Aéreo Colombiano registered F-31 collided with a Tri-Motor of SCADTA, (Sociedad Colombo-Alemana de Transportes Aéreos), registered C-31, at Olaya Herrera Airfield near Medellín, Colombia; of the 20 on board both aircraft, only three passengers survived. Among the dead was the tango singer Carlos Gardel.

== Surviving aircraft ==
As of 2025, 18 Ford Trimotors still existed, eight of which had current FAA airworthiness certificates. (Note: Note: The Ford Tri-Motor List is an enthusiast's register of existing Ford Trimotors, Bushmasters and Stinson Trimotors.)

=== Airworthy ===
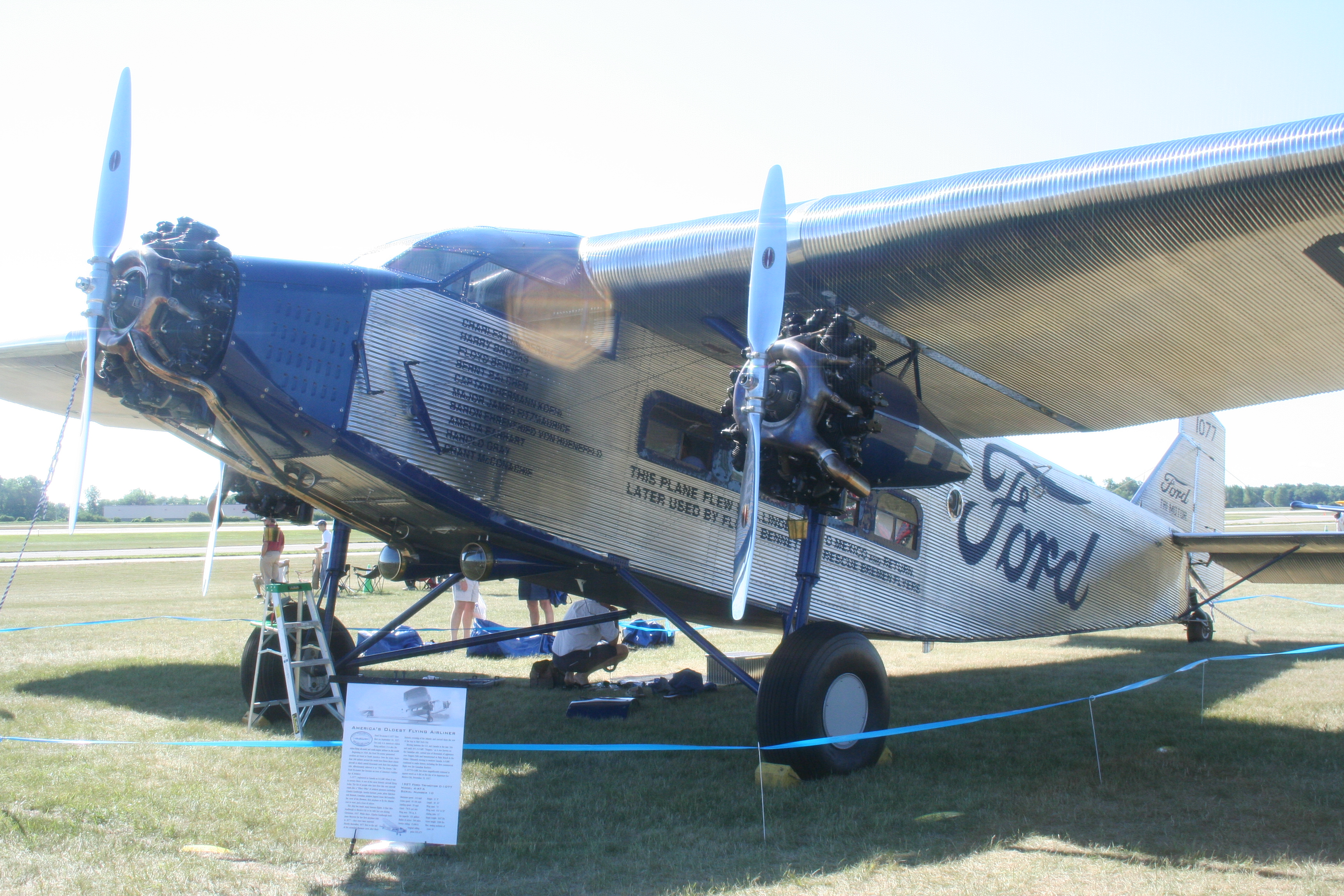
Oldest flying Ford, a 1927 4-AT-A, Serial No. 10, NC1077

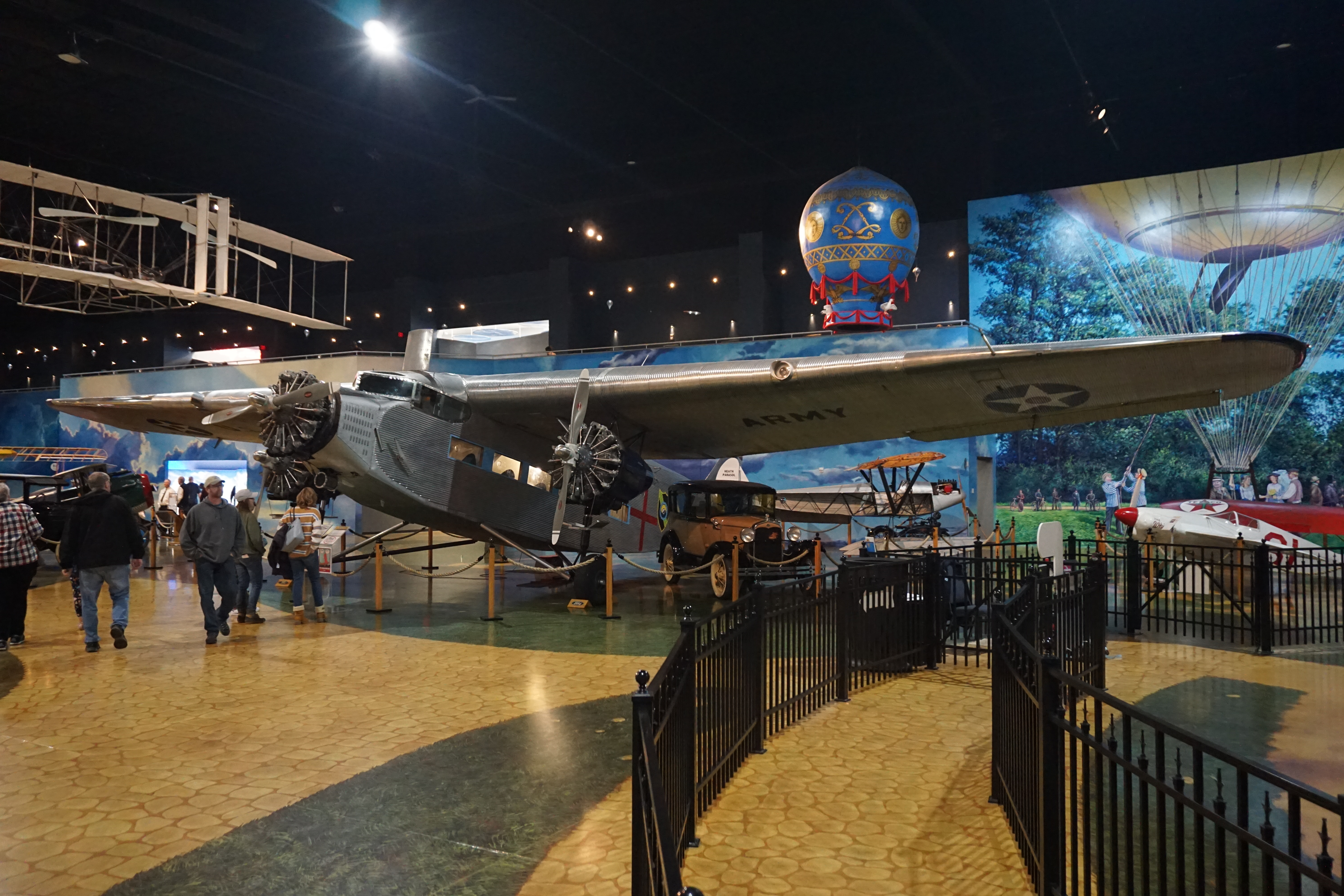
Ford 5-AT-C NC8419 at the Air Zoo in Michigan

- C/N:10 tail number: NC1077 (4-AT-A, September 1927) "NC1077, G-CARC Niagara" Currently owned by Greg Herrick's Yellowstone Aviation. Oldest flying Trimotor, C/N (Construction Number) 10. It is based at the Golden Wings Museum, near Minneapolis, Minnesota, US. This aircraft featured in the 2009 film Amelia (a biopic of aviator Amelia Earhart).
- C/N:42 tail number: NC9610 (Formerly NC7684) (4-AT-B, September 1928) Currently owned by Yankee Air Force, based in Belleville, Michigan, US.
- C/N:55 tail number: NC9612 (4-AT-E, 1929) The "City of Richmond" Originally owned by: Mamer Flying Service, Spokane, WA. Currently owned by: Scott Glover, Mid America Flight Museum. It is based in Mt. Pleasant, Texas, US.
- C/N:69 tail number: NC8407 (4-AT-E, 1929) Originally owned by: Eastern Air Transport Currently owned by: The Experimental Aircraft Association is based at the EAA AirVenture Museum in Oshkosh, Wisconsin, US. It tours the United States performing at airshows and other aviation events.
- C/N:8 tail number: NC9645 (5-AT-B, 1928) "City of Wichita/City of Port Clinton" Currently owned by: Liberty Aviation Museum. It is dressed in Transcontinental Air Transport livery. It is based at the Erie-Ottawa International Airport in Port Clinton, Ohio, US. It was previously owned by Evergreen Vintage Aircraft, Inc., and previously based at the Evergreen Aviation Museum, McMinnville, Oregon, US.
- C/N:34 tail number: N9651 (5-AT-B, 1929) - The "City of Philadelphia" Originally owned by: Trans Continental Air Transport. Currently owned by: Kermit Weeks. It is based at Fantasy of Flight in Polk City, Florida, US. This aircraft has made many film appearances, including Indiana Jones and the Temple of Doom.
- C/N:58 tail number: NC8419 (5-AT-C, 1929) Originally owned by: Northwest Airlines. Currently owned by: Kalamazoo Aviation History Museum. Based at The Air Zoo in Kalamazoo, Michigan, US. The airplane combined several 5-AT airframes, one of which served with five carriers before being used by the United States Forest Service between 1951 and 1959. The original crashed and burned on August 4, 1959, while landing at a remote strip in the Nez Perce National Forest, killing two smokejumpers.
- C/N:74 tail number: N414H (5-AT-C, 1928) Originally owned by: Ford Motor Co. Previously owned by Sopwith, Ltd. It was based at Valle Airport in Valle, Arizona, US. It was used in 2008 and 2009 for flight instruction and type ratings. It is now owned by, and based at the Western Antique Aeroplane & Automobile Museum (WAAAM) in Hood River, Oregon, US.

=== On static display ===
- C/N:15 tail number: NX4542 (4-AT-B, 1928) Richard E. Byrd's South Pole aircraft. Originally owned by: Ford Motor Company. Currently owned by: Henry Ford Museum. It is on display at The Henry Ford Museum in Dearborn, Michigan, US.
- C/N:46 tail number: NC7861 (4-AT-B, Unknown) Originally owned by: Union Electric, St. Louis. Currently owned by: National Museum of Naval Aviation Pensacola, Florida, US. Displayed as Navy RR-5 serial A-9206.
- C/N:11 tail number: NC9637 (5-AT-B,1929) Originally owned by: Pan Am. Currently owned by: the San Diego Air & Space Museum in San Diego, California, US.
- C/N:39 tail number: NC9683 (5-AT-B, 1929) Originally owned by: American Airlines. Currently owned by: The Smithsonian's National Air and Space Museum. in Washington, D.C.
- C/N:60 tail number: none - ex-RAAF (5-AT-C, 1929) Originally owned by: Ford Motor Company; in England. Currently owned by: Papua New Guinea National Museum and Art Gallery. Possible rebuild.

=== Under restoration ===
- C/N:38 tail number: N7584 (4-AT-B, January 1928) Originally owned by: Robertson Aircraft, St Louis. Currently owned by: Kermit Weeks. It was badly damaged in Florida by Hurricane Andrew, in the fall of 1992. Currently Located: Vicksburg, Michigan, US.
- C/N:58 tail number: NC9642 (4-AT-E, January 1929) Originally owned by: Mohawk Airways, NY. Currently owned by: Maurice Hovius' Hov-aire, Inc. Possible rebuild. Sale reported. Currently Located: Vicksburg, Michigan, US.
- C/N:62 tail number: NC8400 (4-AT-E, January 1929) Originally owned by: Mohawk Airways, NY. Currently owned by: Maurice Hovius' Hov-aire, Inc. Possible rebuild. Currently Located: Vicksburg, Michigan, US.
- C/N:65 tail number: NC8403 (4-AT-E, May 1929) The "Ptarmigan II" Originally owned by: Mamer Flying Service. Currently owned by Alaska Aviation Heritage Museum. Possible restoration. As of February 10, 2005, currently Located at Golden Wings Museum near Minneapolis, Minnesota, US.
- C/N:13 tail number: NC9667 (5-AT-B, 1929) The "AN-AAR" Originally owned by Southwest Air Fast Express (S.A.F.E.way). Currently owned by: Maurice Hovius' Hov-aire, Inc. This is a restoration project undertaken by the "Tin Goose Chapter", EAA 1247, in Port Clinton, Ohio, US.

From 1954 onwards, efforts were made to modernize the Trimotor as the Stout Bushmaster 2000. Saddled with financial, management and marketing problems, only two examples were completed with a third fuselage started but never completed.

== Specifications (Ford 4-AT-E Trimotor) ==
Short recording alongside EAA's Ford TriMotor while in Miami, Fl, USA

Data from Flight International 14 November 1930

General characteristics

- Crew: 3 (pilot, co-pilot, flight attendant)
- Capacity: 11 passengers
- Length: 49 ft 10 in (15.19 m)
- Wingspan: 74 ft 0 in (22.56 m)
- Height: 11 ft 9 in (3.58 m)
- Cabin length: 16 ft 3 in (5 m)
- Cabin width (average): 4 ft 6 in (1 m)
- Cabin height (average): 6 ft 0 in (2 m)
- Cabin volume: 461 cu ft (13 m^{3})
- Airfoil: root: Göttingen 386; tip: Göttingen 386
- Empty weight: 6,500 lb (2,948 kg)
- Gross weight: 10,130 lb (4,595 kg)
- Fuel capacity: 231 US gal (192 imp gal; 874 L)
- Oil capacity: 24 US gal (20 imp gal; 91 L)
- Powerplant: 3 × Wright J-6-9 Whirlwind 9-cylinder air-cooled radial piston engines, 300 hp (220 kW) each for take-off
- Propellers: 2-bladed fixed-pitch propellers

Performance

- Maximum speed: 132 mph (212 km/h, 115 kn)
- Cruise speed: 107 mph (172 km/h, 93 kn) at 1,700 rpm
- Stall speed: 57 mph (92 km/h, 50 kn)
- Range: 570 mi (920 km, 500 nmi)
- Service ceiling: 16,500 ft (5,000 m)
- Absolute ceiling: 18,600 ft (5,669 m)
- Absolute ceiling on 2 engines: 7,100 ft (2,164 m)
- Rate of climb: 920 ft/min (4.7 m/s)
- Time to altitude: 7,200 ft (2,195 m) in 10 minutes

== See also ==
Related development

- Stout Bushmaster 2000

Aircraft of comparable role, configuration, and era

- Fokker F.VII
- Junkers G 24
- Junkers G 31

Related lists

- List of aircraft of World War II
- List of civil aircraft
- List of military aircraft of the United States
- List of United States Navy aircraft designations (pre-1962)
