= Stout Bushmaster 2000 =

American three-engined transport aircraft

Bushmaster 2000
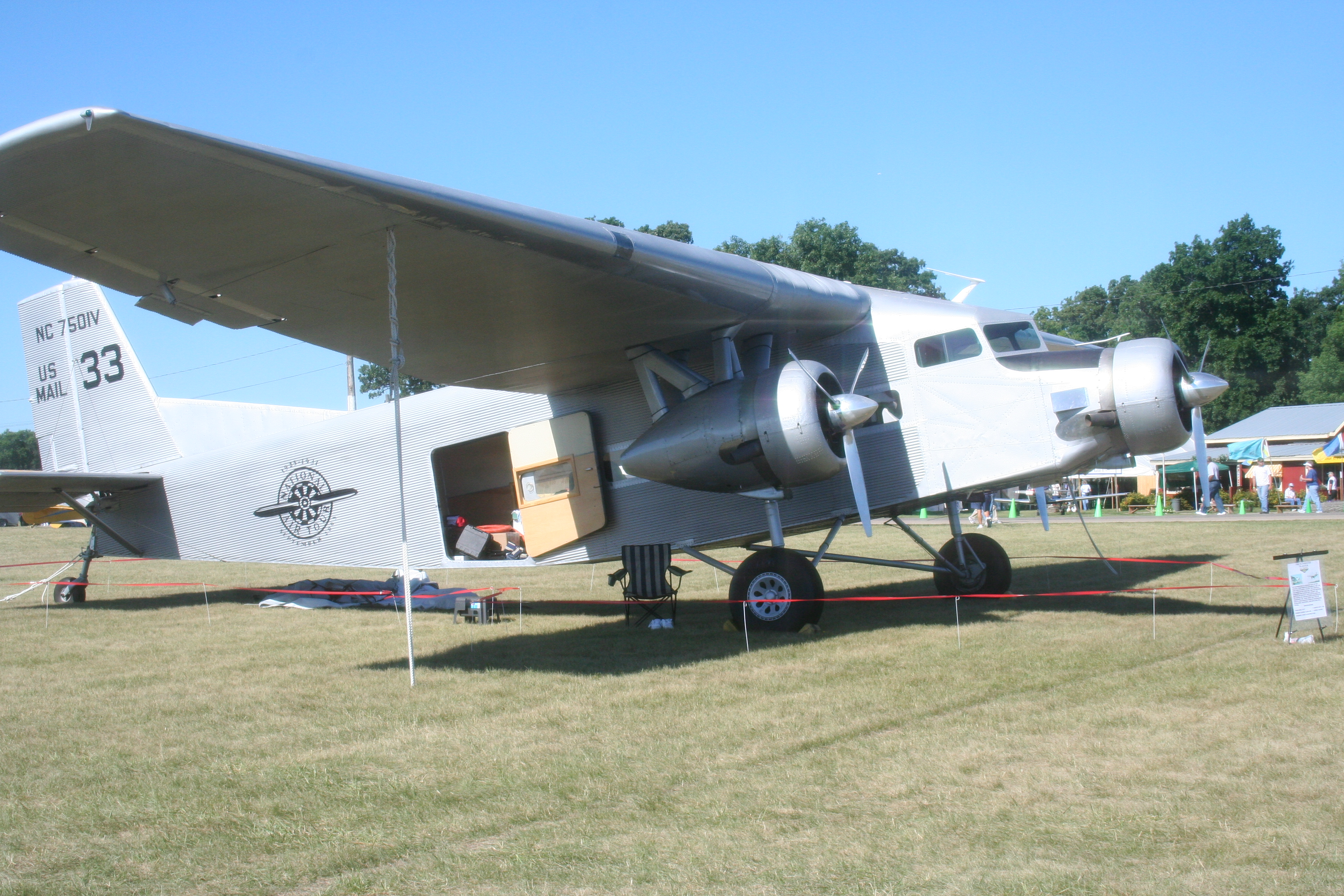
- Bushmaster 2000 at Oshkosh, Wisconsin, 2005

General information
- Type: Airliner
- National origin: United States
- Manufacturer: Bushmaster Aircraft
- Number built: 2

History
- First flight: 1964
- Developed from: Ford Trimotor

The Bushmaster 2000 is a small commuter airliner built in the United States in an attempt to revive the Ford Trimotor design. Work began in 1953 by testing a vintage Trimotor and in 1954 Bill Stout purchased the design rights to the original Trimotor. Due to "Ford Tri-Motor" licensing problems, the Ford 15-AT-D was given the Bushmaster 2000 name. On 15 January 1955, Stout and partner Robert Hayden from the Hayden Aircraft Corporation announced they were planning to build 1,000 new Bushmasters, but it would be eleven years before the first prototype of the new design flew.

The Bushmaster 2000 featured significant modernization of the original 1920s design, particularly in the choice of materials and construction techniques. It also had more powerful engines, enlarged cockpit windows, a lighter and stronger aluminum-alloy skin, a foot-operated hydraulic replacement of the old Trimotor's hand-operated "Johnny Brake," a larger stabilizer and a dorsal fin to reduce yaw, modern trim tabs and interior rather than exterior control cables.

However, even with modern engines and propellers, the aircraft's performance did not compare favorably with contemporary designs of similar capacity, and no sales ensued. Combined with financial, management and marketing problems, only two examples were built with a third fuselage never completed.

The first Bushmaster, N7501V was assembled in 1966, and is owned by Pleasant Aviation LLC At mid America flight Museum and based at Mt Pleasant Regional Airport near Mount Pleasant, Texas. The second aircraft N750RW was completed 18 January 1985 by Ralph Williams, the President of Hydro-Forming in Long Beach, California. This aircraft was written off in an accident at Fullerton Municipal Airport, California on 25 September 2004.

== Specifications ==
Data from Jane's All the World's Aircraft 1974–75

General characteristics

- Crew: Two
- Capacity: 23 passengers
- Length: 50 ft 8 in (15.44 m)
- Wingspan: 77 ft 11 in (23.75 m)
- Height: 13 ft 5 in (4.09 m)
- Wing area: 851.7 sq ft (79.13 m^{2})
- Empty weight: 7,500 lb (3,402 kg)
- Gross weight: 12,500 lb (5,670 kg)
- Powerplant: 3 × Pratt & Whitney R-985-AN-1 Wasp Junior 9-cylinder radial engines , 450 hp (340 kW) each

Performance

- Maximum speed: 128 mph (206 km/h, 111 kn) IAS
- Stall speed: 55 mph (89 km/h, 48 kn)
- Range: 700 mi (1,100 km, 610 nmi)

== See also ==
Related development

- Ford Trimotor

Aircraft of comparable role, configuration, and era

- Junkers JU-52NG

== Bibliography ==
- O'Callaghan, Timothy J. (2002). The Aviation Legacy of Henry & Edsel Ford. Ann Arbor, Michigan: Proctor Publications.
- O'Leary, Michael (December 2004). "Bushmaster Lost". Air Classics.
- "Return of the Tin Goose". Time. 6 January 1967. Archived from the original on 29 May 2011.
- Taylor, John W. R. (ed.). Jane's All the World's Aircraft 1974–75. New York: Franklin Watts, Inc. ISBN 0-531-02747-3.
- Taylor, Michael J. H. (1989). Jane's Encyclopedia of Aviation. London: Studio Editions. p. 225.
- World Aircraft Information Files. London: Bright Star Publishing. pp. File 890 Sheet 101.
