= Maddux Air Lines =

Airline of Southern California (1927–1930)

Coordinates: 33°56′29.7″N 118°24′31″W

- Maddux Air Lines logo
IATA	ICAO	Call sign
-	-	-
- Commenced operations: September 22, 1927; 98 years ago
- Ceased operations: November 16, 1929; 96 years ago (merged with Transcontinental Air Transport to form TAT-Maddux)
- Operating bases: Mines Field; Lindbergh Field
- Key people: Jack L. Maddux

Maddux Air Lines was an airline based in Southern California that operated Ford Tri-motors in California, Arizona, and Mexico in the late 1920s.

== Founding ==
In 1927 Jack L. Maddux, an owner of a Los Angeles Ford and Lincoln car dealership, founded Maddux Air Lines. The airline's inaugural flight was on September 22, 1927 when the airline's Ford 4-AT Tri-motor carrying 12 passengers flew from San Diego, California to Los Angeles, California. This flight was to a small dirt landing strip that would later become Los Angeles International Airport, although the landing strip, called Inglewood Site, was not suitable for the airline, and Jack Maddux chose instead Rogers Airport, with improved facilities, and later Grand Central Air Terminal in Glendale. Among the passengers were several notables, and although the event was kept relatively quiet, it served as a publicity act.

== History ==
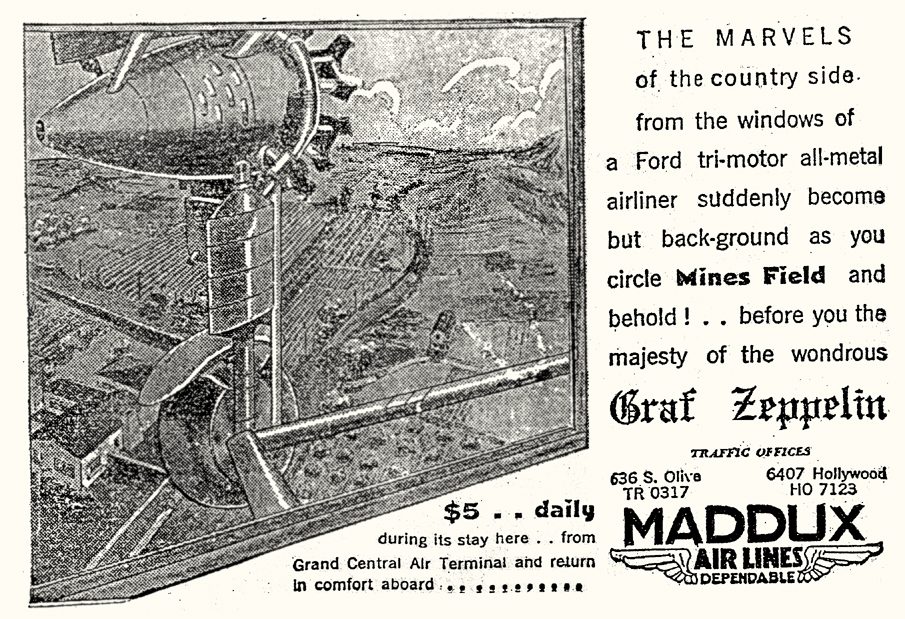
Advertisement for airplane rides from Grand Central Air Terminal to see the Graf Zeppelin then visiting Los Angeles (August, 1929)

In the remaining few months of 1927 Maddux carried 1400 passengers. For the following few years Maddux expanded its fleet of Ford Tri-motors and its routes. The airline's hubs were in Los Angeles and San Diego.

In April 1928 Maddux started passenger service from Los Angeles to San Francisco, California, with scheduled stops in Fresno and Oakland and, by reservation, in Visalia and Bakersfield. It competed with Western Air Express on this route. Service also began from San Diego to Agua Caliente, Tijuana, in Mexico, in November. 9440 passengers were transported that year.

In February 1929 passenger service to Phoenix, Arizona began. Other local short-hop flights were also added. On August 26, 1929 a Maddux Tri-motor, along with other aircraft, escorted the famous LZ 127 Graf Zeppelin airship to Mines Field (now part of Los Angeles International Airport) where it stopped during its around the world flight.

Among the famous aviators who were involved with Maddux were Charles Lindbergh and Amelia Earhart. Maddux also had a publicity department that advertised the celebrities who flew with the airline. These included Will Rogers, who rode on the inaugural flight, and Hollywood actors Arthur Edmund Carewe and Dolores del Río.

Maddux Air Line, established in 1927 was the California terminus for Trancontinental Air Transport (TAT) when it started New York to California operations in July 1929. For six months the Maddux and TAT airplanes carried a combination logo of their two companies until TAT bought out Maddux in November 1929. Lindbergh helped establish TAT but had nothing to do with the Maddux operation.

== Merging ==
On November 16, 1929 Transcontinental Air Transport (T-A-T), an airline offering transcontinental service with the use of trains and planes, bought Maddux Air Lines, resulting in TAT-Maddux Air Lines, with Jack Maddux as the western head. Charles Lindbergh, who worked more with TAT than with Maddux, stayed at the Maddux's home to negotiate the merger. Combined, this airline operated the largest fleet of Tri-motors at the time, including seven 5-AT's and several more 4-AT's, carrying 40,000 passengers in 1929. In 1930 TAT-Maddux merged with its former competitor Western Air Express to form Transcontinental & Western Air (T&WA), which later became TWA.

== Accidents ==
On April 21, 1929 a Maddux Air Lines Ford 5-AT-B Tri-motor was involved in a midair collision with a single-engine U.S. Army Boeing PW-9D pursuit biplane near San Diego. Shortly after taking off from San Diego, the airliner was flying at around 2,000 ft (610 m) on its way to Imperial Valley, California, when the pilot of the biplane buzzed the airliner and, misjudging its speed, collided with it. The army pilot, Lieutenant Howard W. Keefer, tried to bail out of the wreckage, but his parachute got entangled, and both aircraft crashed near the Lexington Park subdivision of eastern San Diego on the side of a canyon. All five people aboard the Tri-Motor and the Army pilot, who was found “criminally negligent” for approaching the airliner, died in the crash. This was the first midair collision involving a U.S. airliner.

On January 19, 1930 TAT-Maddux Flight Number 7, a Ford 5-AT-C Tri-Motor crashed north of Oceanside, California. Flying from the races at Agua Caliente Racetrack, near Tijuana, Mexico to Los Angeles, the plane encountered rain, low clouds, fog, and possibly engine problems. The pilots were attempting to turn around and/or land when they misjudged the aircraft's height off the ground and the left wing struck the ground, slamming the aircraft into the ground, which subsequently caught fire. Both pilots and all 14 passengers aboard died in the crash. Charles Lindbergh, as chairman of TAT-Maddux's technical committee, was involved in the investigation and made an aerial inspection of the crash site after the disaster.

== See also ==
- List of defunct airlines of the United States
