= Transcontinental Air Transport =

1928–1930 American airline, predecessor of TWA

- Founded: 1928; 98 years ago
- Commenced operations: July 7, 1929; 96 years ago
- Ceased operations: 1930; 96 years ago (merged with Western Air Express to form what became TWA)
- Key people: Charles Lindbergh

Transcontinental Air Transport (T-A-T) was an airline founded in 1928 by Clement Melville Keys that merged in 1930 with Western Air Express to form what became TWA. Keys enlisted the help of Charles Lindbergh to design a transcontinental network to get government airmail contracts. Lindbergh established numerous airports across the country in this effort. Lindbergh's involvement led to the airline becoming popularly known as the Lindbergh Line.

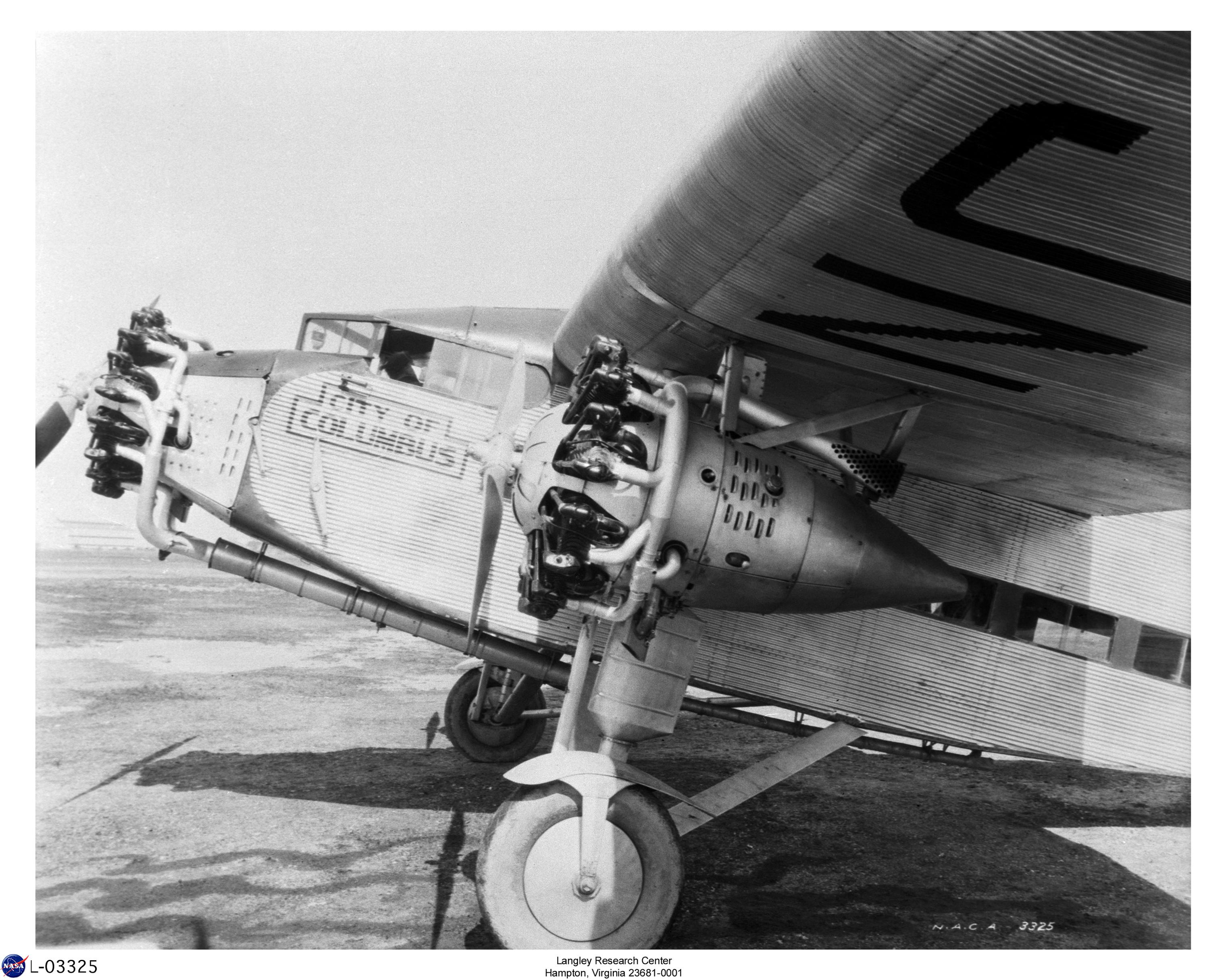
TAT Ford 5-AT-B City of Columbus flown by Lindbergh

== History ==
The original TAT route between New York and Los Angeles

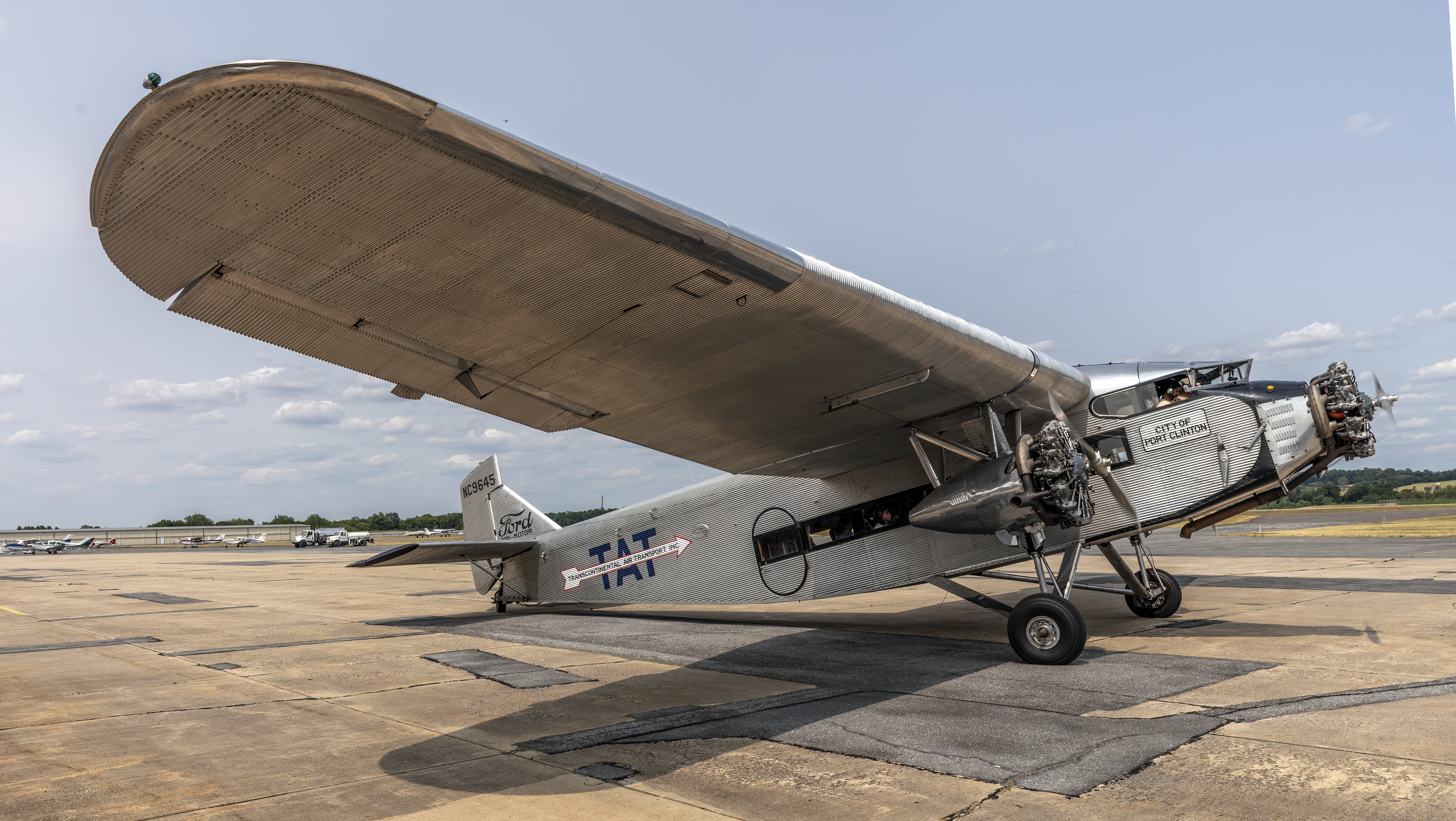
A former TAT aircraft N9645, photographed in 2023

On July 7, 1929, transcontinental trips began. It initially offered a 48-hour coast to coast trip with the passengers taking flights during the day and trains by night.

The first leg on the Pennsylvania Railroad departed from New York City at 6:05pm Eastern time and travelled overnight to Columbus, Ohio. There, passengers boarded a Ford Trimotor aircraft at what is now John Glenn Columbus International Airport, and flew to Waynoka, Oklahoma, an 11-hour flight that required four brief stops. At Waynoka, passengers boarded a Santa Fe Railway train for a second overnight rail trip to Clovis, New Mexico. There, they took a second Ford Trimotor flight to Los Angeles, with three stops along the way, eventually arriving at 5:52pm Pacific time at the Grand Central Airport in Glendale.

The return journey departed from Los Angeles at 8:45am and arrived at New York at 9:50am of the third day. The one-way fare from New York to Los Angeles was $352 ($6,600 in 2025).

The Ford Trimotor service was one of the first to offer meals en route, provided by the Fred Harvey Company.; Fred Harvey also provided meals on the ground at several stops. The service was also one of the first to be geared toward passengers–most airlines at the time focused on transporting air mail. Cynics were to deride the TAT abbreviation as "Take A Train". And in its first eighteen months of operation, the company lost $2.7 million ($52 million in 2025).

In November 1929 TAT bought Maddux Air Lines. The company was tendering to the United States Postal Service for the contract for the New York to Los Angeles air mail route. However, before granting the contract Walter Folger Brown, the US postmaster general forced TAT to merge with Western Air Express to form Transcontinental & Western Air (T&WA). In October 1930, the new airline began an all-air, coast to coast passenger service that took 36 hours, with an overnight stop at Kansas City Western became an independent company once again in 1934. However, Transcontinental opted to retain the T&WA name, and eventually evolved into Trans World Airlines or TWA.

== Accidents and incidents ==
On September 3, 1929, NC9649, named City of San Francisco, crashed into the forested slope of Mount Taylor near Grants, New Mexico. The crash took place during a thunderstorm; the three crew and five passengers on board died.

The September crash was the first of three serious accidents for TAT over the next five months.

== Legacy ==
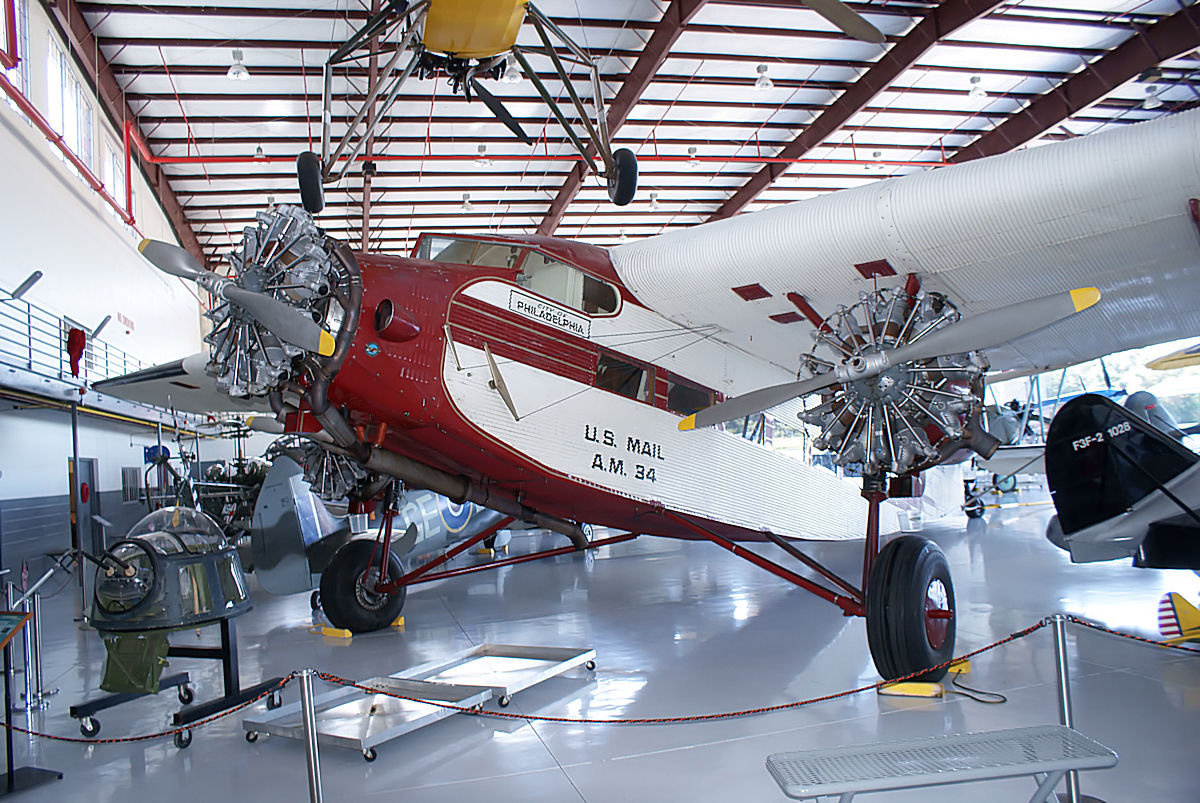
N9651. City of Philadelphia, formerly one of the TAT fleet (2009)

Two of the Ford Tri-Motors that flew the transcontinental route with TAT are preserved in flying condition:

- N9645, serial number 8. Built in 1928 it was registered as NC9645 and named City of Wichita in TAT service. The aircraft is currently owned by: Liberty Aviation Museum. It is painted in TAT livery with the name City of Port Clinton and is based at the Erie-Ottawa International Airport in Port Clinton, Ohio. Since 1964, it has been registered as N9645.
- N9651, serial number 34. Built in 1929 and named City of Philadelphia, it is currently owned by Kermit Weeks. The aircraft is based at Fantasy of Flight in Polk City, Florida. When in service with TAT, the aircraft flew the Clovis to Los Angeles leg of the journey.

The Western New Mexico Aviation Heritage Museum in Grants, New Mexico, has a restored light and arrow which was used to direct pilots along the route. The United States Forest Service district office in Grants stores a collection of items of wreckage recovered from the crash site of NC9649, City of San Francisco. A USFS-sponsored, 2009 archaeological survey of the site found many other fragments of the aircraft.

== See also ==
- List of defunct airlines of the United States
