= Elm Farm Ollie =

First cow to fly in an airplane

Painting of Elm Farm Ollie by E.D. Thalinger in 1930

Elm Farm Ollie (also known as "Nellie Jay") became the first cow to fly in an airplane on February 18, 1930, as part of the International Aircraft Exposition in St. Louis, Missouri, United States.

== Flight ==
=== Background ===
The newly-built St. Louis Arena served as the location for the second International Aircraft Exposition. Organized by the Aeronautical Chamber of Commerce, the expo aimed to reinvigorate the floundering aviation industry. The onset of the Great Depression in the United States greatly diminished the market for planes, while supply of aircraft remained high, as did the public's concerns about the flight safety. Simultaneously, the industry grappled with internal struggles related to U.S. government air mail contracts which they felt threatened their financial stability. Famous aviators including Edward Stinson and Elinor Smith took part in the expo to help draw crowds. Charles Lindbergh, renowned pilot of the Spirit of St. Louis, was announced as an attendee. Event organizers promised public displays of planes and other aviation exhibits valued at over $2,500,000, an aviation-themed musical, and aerial demonstrations, including several world-record and world-first flights.

=== Record Flight ===
Up until the expo, no cow is known to have flown. In keeping with the motivations for the show, it was hoped that getting a cow airborne would generate buzz about planes, show the stability and safety of aircraft, and demonstrate the possibility of aviation as an effective means to transport livestock. Advertisements for the stunt also promised "scientific data will be collected on her behavior." Elm Farm Ollie, a Guernsey cow, was flown in a Ford Trimotor piloted by Claude Sterling of Parks Air College from her home at Sunnymeade Farms in Bismarck, Missouri to St. Louis. She was reportedly chosen because of her high daily milk yield, requiring up to three daily milkings. She was milked by Elsworth Bunce, in the process also becoming the first cow milked in-flight. The yield was then put into containers attached to parachutes and tossed out of the aircraft as it flew over the onlookers in the city below. Some accounts state the milking occurred on the flight from Bismarck, while others indicate it took place during a second flight that originated in St. Louis. As Lindbergh was speculated to attend the exposition, some milk was reserved for him, though the speculation proved to be false and he never actually made it to St. Louis.

=== Legacy ===
The story of Elm Farm Ollie turned up several times in trivia books and newspaper articles over the decades, including a feature in the Ripley's Believe It or Not! comic strip. She has been enshrined in Wisconsin, the Dairy State, where Barry Levenson, a former state Assistant Attorney General and founder of the National Mustard Museum, made February 18 "Elm Farm Ollie Day" in connection to a festival in Mount Horeb, Wisconsin, the museum's former location. Levenson's contributions to the Elm Farm Ollie corpus include a cantata titled "Madamme Butterfat."

== See also ==
- Hey Diddle Diddle
- Air cargo
- Elsie the Cow
- The Montgolfier brothers demonstrate ballooning with animals
- Animals in space
