= Johnson bar (disambiguation) =

Johnson bar may refer to:

- Johnson bar, a type of corrugated metal bar used to reinforce concrete
- Johnson bar (vehicle), a hand lever on various vehicles
- Johnson Bar (locomotive), a hand lever on steam locomotives
- Johnson bar, a lever-dolly (similar to a crowbar) for moving heavy apparatus
