= Johnson bar (vehicle) =

Hand lever on various vehicles

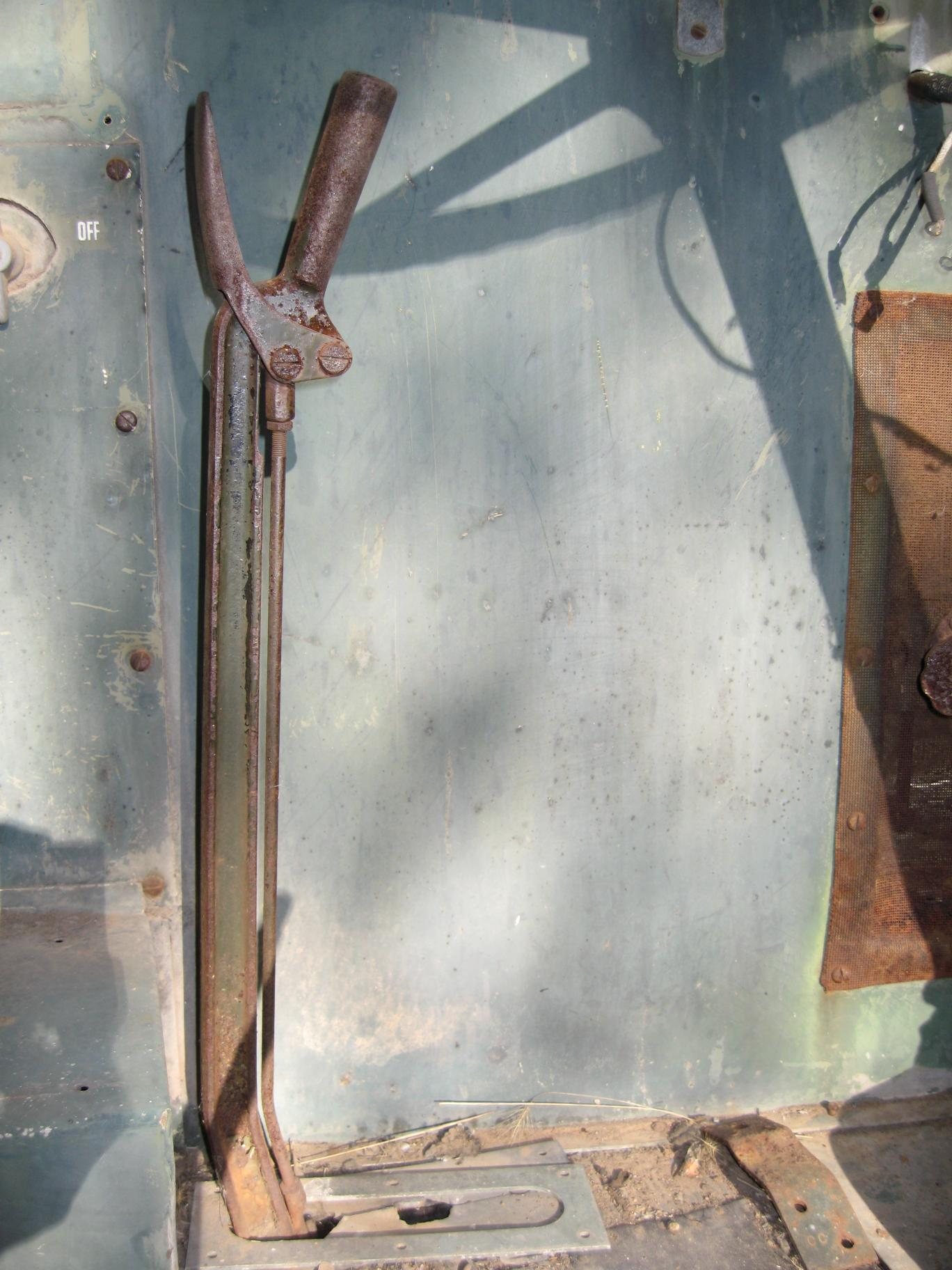
A Johnson bar activated parking/emergency brake on a 1930s White transit bus

Johnson bar is the term for several different hand-operated levers used in vehicles. Their distinguishing feature is a positive latch, typically spring-loaded, to hold the lever in a selected position, capable of being operated with one hand. Some Johnson bars have a fully ratcheting mechanism, some just a series of detents, and others yet simply engaged and disengaged positions.

A common example is the Johnson bar-controlled parking brake found on many trucks and buses.

Johnson bar is also the North American term for a steam engine's reversing lever, used to control the valve gear.

The forward/reverse lever on Caterpillar tractors is also called a Johnson bar.

Some light general aviation aircraft (including Piper Cherokees, Beech Musketeers, and some early model Cessnas—such as the Cessna 140)—use Johnson bars to actuate flaps and wheel brakes. The Cessna 162 Skycatcher uses a Johnson bar for flap operation. A small number of older aircraft (including the Mooney M-18, some older M20s and some Progressive Aerodyne SeaReys) also have landing gear actuated by Johnson bars. The Boeing 707/720 aircraft had a Johnson bar for manually extending the nose landing gear, in case the normal gear extension failed.

== See also ==
- Cutoff
- Reversing lever
