= WTTF =

Radio station in Tiffin, Ohio

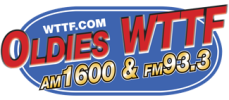
- Tiffin, Ohio; United States
- Broadcast area: Seneca County
- Frequency: 1600 kHz
- Branding: Oldies WTTF

Programming
- Language: English
- Format: Oldies
- Affiliations: ABC News Radio; Westwood One

Ownership
- Owner: Tom Klein; (BAS Broadcasting, Inc.)
- Sister stations: WCPZ; WFRO-FM; WLEC; WMJK; WOHF

History
- First air date: 1959
- Call sign meaning: We're Talking TIFfin

Technical information
- Licensing authority: FCC
- Facility ID: 70527
- Class: D
- Power: 500 watts (daytime); 19 watts (nighttime)
- Transmitter coordinates: 41°07′32″N 83°13′55″W
- Translator: 93.3 W227BJ (Tiffin)

Links
- Public license information: Public file; LMS
- Webcast: Listen live
- Website: www.wttf.com

WTTF (1600 AM) — branded as Oldies WTTF — is a commercial radio station licensed to Tiffin, Ohio broadcasting a full service oldies format, along with an emphasis on local news, talk and high school sports. Owned and operated by Tom Klein, through licensee BAS Broadcasting, Inc., the station serves Tiffin and much of surrounding Seneca County.

WTTF operates at 1600 kHz with a maximum daytime power of 500 watts, reducing its output power to 19 watts at night. The station transmits its AM signal from a three-tower directional antenna array on County Road 112, two miles southwest of downtown Tiffin. WTTF is simulcast full-time on low-power FM translator W227BJ (93.3 FM), also licensed to Tiffin.

== History ==
WTTF was founded by Robert G. Wright and Milton Maltz, who joined forces to form Malrite Broadcasting Company (the name "Malrite" being a combination of the two surnames), ultimately owning a chain of radio station in the Great Lakes area, including WTTF-AM-FM. The construction permit for WTTF was first applied for in June 1957, and to initially broadcast at 1250 kHz. However, this application was amended a year later to its present frequency. Studios were located at 112 East Market Street in downtown Tiffin, but by 1965 had moved to 185 South Washington Street, where they would remain for the duration of the Malrite-Wright ownership era.

In May 1972, WTTF and its FM sister station, WTTF-FM (known today as WCKY-FM), had split from Malrite into its own entity, completely independent of Malrite, after Maltz had sold his stake in the stations to Wright. However, the licensee remained that of WTTF, Inc., which had been changed from Malrite shortly before the station signed on.

For much of its existence, WTTF-AM-FM was a 100 percent simulcast operation under the ownership of WTTF, Inc. This was highly unusual for a 50,000 watt FM station, with a signal that reached two other states (Michigan and Indiana), and a full-service news and talk-intensive format, even after WTTF had received nighttime power in the late 1980s. It became a family-owned business in every sense of the word. Robert G. Wright served as the station's general manager until the mid-1970s, when he retired and his younger son Richard J. "Dick" Wright, who also served as the station's chief engineer, assumed those duties. Wright's elder son, Robert E. "Bob" (but answered to his middle name Ed in order to avoid confusion with his father) Wright, served as station program director and promotions manager.

Not much of the WTTF operation had changed over the course of Wright ownership. For years, even after the advent of magnetic tape and then compact disc, WTTF didn't fully make the conversion for its music. However, Dick Wright built a live-assist automation system in the mid-1980s consisting of four reel-to-reel tape players controlled by the operator in the studio. This would supply the regular weekday music programming up until the station's sale in 1997. Records were still played from the longtime turntables in the studio for its Saturday music programming called Saturday at the Oldies. Another program, Sunday Gold featured music from a different reel-to-reel tape library.

The station also aired Tradio, a buy-sell-trade program three times a day. The program had started originally as a longform one, but was shortened to about five minutes each broadcast, to avoid possible listener tuneout. The incredibly popular program jammed the phone lines each day with listeners offering items for sale, or wanting to buy.

=== The DW-76 ===
WTTF, known for its thriftiness over the years, also became recognized for its engineering ingenuity. When the FCC mandated Emergency Broadcast System (EBS) monitoring by all licensed radio stations, requiring the purchase of special reception equipment, Dick Wright built WTTF's EBS receiver himself. The unit, called the DW-76 (meaning Dick Wright and its 1976 manufacture date), was field tested and granted FCC type approval for legal use only at WTTF.

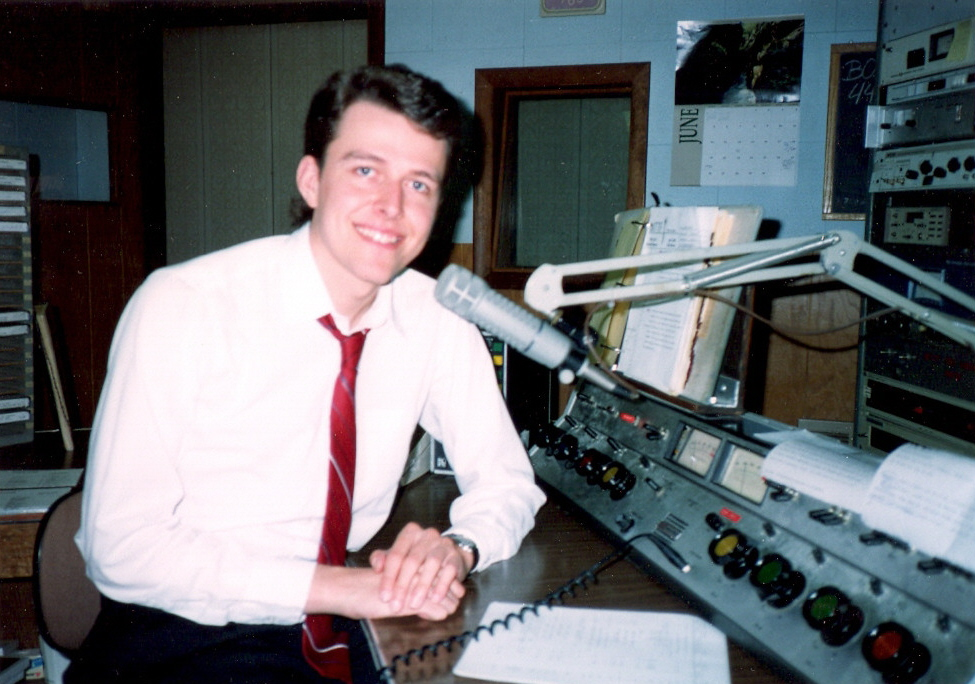
Former WTTF-AM-FM afternoon announcer Ken Hawk in 1994, taken in the main on-air studio at former 185 South Washington Street studio location. The DW-76 is seen just below microphone boom (gray panel with two switches).

=== Wrights die; stations sold ===
Robert G. Wright died of lung cancer at the age of 67 in July 1983. Ownership of the station was passed on to his sons and his wife Florence. This ownership arrangement continued for many years until February 1996, when tragedy struck the Wright family.

Robert E. Wright died in a car accident in his Jeep Wrangler while traveling northbound on Ohio Route 53 during a heavy snowstorm. His vehicle went left of center and struck an oncoming pickup driven by a 65-year-old woman, who also perished in the crash. Wright was 56.

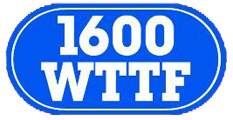
WTTF logo, 1998-2008.

Dick Wright and his mother, as the two surviving owners, decided to sell the station the following year to Jacor Communications, which would also gradually be absorbed into the Clear Channel Communications corporate structure. Following the takeover by Clear Channel, WTTF-FM was rechristened WCKY-FM, with separate programming from the AM station and taking a country format under the "Buckeye Country" banner. Florence Wright died at age 84 on May 11, 2000.

After the sale, Dick Wright was retained with the title of Assistant Engineer, largely due to the close proximity of the transmitter facilities to his home, thus making him able to quickly fix any transmitter problems. Wright continued in this capacity until his death on January 1, 2008 at the age of 66.

== Facilities and programming ==
In 2003, Clear Channel moved both stations from its longtime location at 185 South Washington Street into a new location further down the street at Washington Town Square, where it remained until December 2010.

Under the previous ownership by Clear Channel Communications), WTTF aired the programming of Fox Sports Radio with a mix of adult contemporary and oldies as indicated by its tagline "Music and More." Fox News Radio was aired at the top of the hour in addition to local news and sports coverage. It remains a locally originating full service station serving Tiffin and Seneca County in addition to the Findlay, Carey, Fostoria, Fremont, Bucyrus, Norwalk, Bowling Green and Sandusky areas within its west to northeast direction pattern.

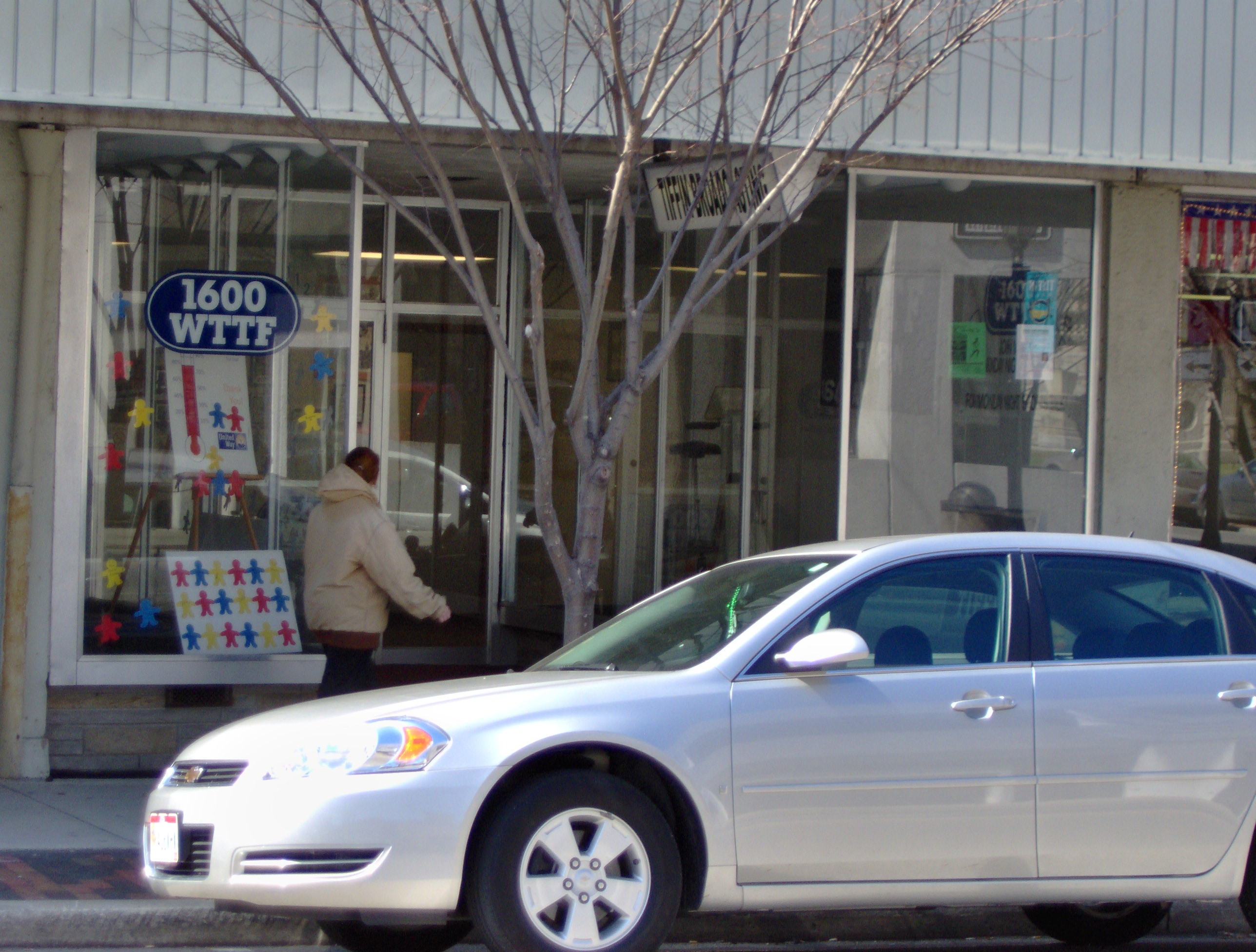
WTTF's former studios at Washington Town Square on South Washington Street, downtown Tiffin.

Clear Channel initially was selling their Findlay cluster, along with other small market clusters, over to Florida based GoodRadio.TV LLC in May 2007, but the deal soon collapsed prior to FCC approval. Clear Channel ended up spinning off WTTF, along with the Sandusky cluster and WPFX over to Fremont-based BAS Broadcasting on January 15, 2008. BAS took over WTTF on February 1, and as WCKY-FM is not included in the deal, this ended 45 years of common ownership between the two stations.

WTTF switched to an oldies format in the latter part of August 2008, before settling on ABC/Citadel's "Timeless" channel (which sister stations WLEC and WMVO also carried). With the demise of "Timeless" in February 2010, WTTF moved to Waitt Radio Networks' The Lounge programming service. The station aired Cumulus Media's True Oldies Channel, hosted by Scott Shannon, for much of its programming day. ABC News Radio airs at the top of the hour. WTTF's high school sports coverage is networked with sister stations WFRO-FM, WLEC and WMJK as the BAS Sports Network.

WTTF was spun off in 2008 by BAS Broadcasting to radio talk show host (and Heidelberg College graduate) Doug Stephan's company Tiffin Broadcasting LLC. BAS continued to operate WTTF via an LMA (local marketing agreement) until late 2009. Stephan's syndicated weekday talk show Doug Stephan's Good Day was eventually carried on WTTF.

According to the October 25, 2008 issue of the Advertiser-Tribune, WTTF was to be donated to Heidelberg College as a gift by Stephan., which ultimately did not happen. Though Stephan still owned the station, WTTF's studios moved from Washington Town Square into Heidelberg's new Adams Hall School of Business (the former Laird Hall of Science) in December 2010, teaming it with Heidelberg's existing campus station WHEI, while still operating as a commercial entity.

On February 26, 2011, WTTF began an FM simulcast using FM translator W227BJ at 93.3 MHz (but otherwise branded as "AM 1600 and Cool FM 93.3 WTTF").

WTTF was acquired by Anthony Paradiso's Tiffin Broadcasting II, LLC, on the week of February 21, 2014, after Stephan's arrangement to donate the license to Heidelberg University failed to be consummated. Paradiso was a partner with Stephen on the previous incarnation of Tiffin Broadcasting and a 17% owner in BAS Broadcasting.

After the sale, WTTF dropped Stephen's "Good Day" programming from the schedule in favor of a locally hosted morning drive program hosted by John Spahr. The station's oldies format continued despite the closedown of "The True Oldies Channel."

On April 13, 2020, BAS Broadcasting purchased WTTF after a reverse LMA of more than five years. Studios were moved from the campus of Heidelberg College to 80 E Market Street in Tiffin, at the corner of Ohio state routes 18 and 100. The purchase, at a price of $688,000, was consummated on May 28, 2020.

== Personnel ==
WTTF has enjoyed a history of tenured personnel over the years. Former news director Frank Barber (1940 - 2013) held this position when joining WTTF-AM-FM in 1994 until the sale to BAS Broadcasting in February 2008 (although he still was employed by Clear Channel until a nationwide downsizing effort on April 28, 2009). Barber replaced Jack Kagy, who had held the position for 22 years until leaving the station to take a job with Seneca County.

Account executive Conrad (C.C.) Hufford was also a longtime fixture of WTTF, having first joined the station in the late 1960s. He retired in October 2020 after 54 years of service. Also, John Buccigross, of ESPN, and well known standup comic Brian Regan each worked one season with Kagy as color announcers for WTTF's coverage of Heidelberg college football while they were students at Heidelberg.
