= WLEC =

Radio station in Sandusky, Ohio

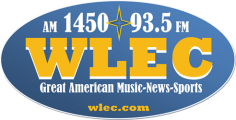
- Sandusky, Ohio; United States
- Broadcast area: Sandusky–Port Clinton; Lake Erie Islands
- Frequency: 1450 kHz
- Branding: AM 1450 93.5 FM WLEC

Programming
- Language: English
- Format: Full-service and oldies
- Affiliations: ABC News Radio; Cleveland Guardians Radio Network; Ohio State Sports Network; Westwood One

Ownership
- Owner: BAS Broadcasting
- Sister stations: WCPZ; WFRO-FM; WMJK; WOHF

History
- First air date: December 7, 1947
- Call sign meaning: founding owners Lake Erie Corporation

Technical information
- Licensing authority: FCC
- Facility ID: 19705
- Class: C
- Power: 1,000 watts
- Transmitter coordinates: 41°26′28″N 82°41′14″W
- Translator: 93.5 W228EN (Sandusky)

Links
- Public license information: Public file; LMS
- Webcast: Listen live
- Website: wlec.com

WLEC (1450 AM) is a commercial radio station licensed to Sandusky, Ohio, United States, featuring a full-service and oldies format. Owned by Fremont-based BAS Broadcasting, the station serves the Sandusky/Port Clinton/Lake Erie Islands market (collectively referred to as Vacationland and/or the Firelands), including Erie, Ottawa, and Huron counties.

WLEC is the local affiliate of the Cleveland Guardians, the NFL on Westwood One, and the Ohio State radio networks. The WLEC studios and transmitter are co-located in a Quonset hut east of Sandusky's downtown. In addition to a standard analog transmission, WLEC's programming simulcasts over low-power FM translator W228BN (93.5 FM), and is also available online.

In addition, WLEC is the home for weekly local high school football and basketball broadcasts.

== History ==
WLEC began broadcasting December 7, 1947, as a Mutual affiliate on 1450 kHz with 250 watts of power (full-time). The licensee was Lake Erie Broadcasting Company. After signing on, WLEC became a charter affiliate of the Cleveland Indians Radio Network—which originated from WJW (850 AM) and WJW-FM (104.1) starting with the 1948 season—WLEC has remained an affiliate and is the longest-tenured affiliate in the network. WLEC also became an affiliate of the Standard Network, also originating from WJW-FM, at the end of 1948.

WLEC and WLEC-FM (the latter was established a year prior) were purchased by former Cleveland Mayor Ray T. Miller's Cleveland Broadcasting Incorporated in January 1960; Miller founded both WERE (1300 AM) and WERE-FM (98.5) in Cleveland, and also owned WERC (1260 AM) in Erie, Pennsylvania, later purchasing KFAC (1330 AM) and KFAC (92.3 FM) in Los Angeles.

After Ray T. Miller's death in 1966, Cleveland Broadcasting Incorporated was acquired by Atlantic States Industries (ASI) for a combined $9 million in May 1968. Due to ASI already owning five AM stations and one FM station, and because of an interim policy/proposed rule by the Federal Communications Commission (FCC) that prohibited the purchase of an AM and FM station in the same market—the "one-to-a-customer" policy—the FCC ordered the divestiture of WERE-FM, along with WLEC and WLEC-FM, to a third party. While General Cinema Corporation purchased WERE-FM after a prior divestiture attempt failed, WLEC and WLEC-FM were initially sold to RadiOhio that December, but that sale was also dismissed.

Both WLEC and WLEC-FM were ultimately retained by the sellers and spun off to a limited partnership, Lake Erie Broadcasting. Cleveland Broadcasting president Richard H. Miller became WLEC's general manager, then purchased both stations outright in August 1971, under the Miller Broadcasting name.

In July 1986 the station was sold by Miller Broadcasting, headed by Richard H. Miller of Cleveland, to Erie Broadcasting Co., owned by Cleveland's Jim Embrescia. After a brief period in the hands of Signal One Communications from October 1987 to May 1990, it passed, along with WCPZ FM 102.7, to Erie Broadcasting II, Inc., a new company also headed by Embrescia. The format at the time was full-service adult contemporary.

On April 30, 1997, it was announced that Jacor Communications, Inc. agreed to buy WLEC and WCPZ from Erie Broadcasting II, Inc. for $7.65 million. The sale was approved and the license transferred on June 25. In May 1999, Clear Channel Communications completed its $6.5 billion purchase of Jacor and its 454 stations, including WLEC.

WLEC itself maintained a pop standards/beautiful music format dubbed "American Music Classics". This was a traditional leaning standards format playing artists like Frank Sinatra, Barbra Streisand, Nat King Cole, Neil Diamond, Ella Fitzgerald, Tony Bennett, Carpenters, Ames Brothers, and others. The station also mixed in small amounts of contemporary artists doing standards such as Rod Stewart, Michael Bublé, Diana Krall, and others. WLEC dropped standards and switched to Fox Sports Radio on September 8, 2006.

On November 16, 2006, WLEC, WCPZ and WMJK were formally announced for sale as part of Clear Channel's divestiture of almost 450 small and middle-market radio properties in the U.S. The cluster was sold on January 15, 2008, to Fremont, Ohio based BAS Broadcasting, and BAS took over all three stations on February 1. WLEC then sort of changed back to a standards format on March 3, 2008, using the more classic adult contemporary Timeless format of soft oldies from the 1960s, 1970s and 1980s from ABC Radio (later Citadel Media).

Following Citadel Media's ending the Timeless format in February 2010, WLEC adopted the "Lounge" format from Dial Global Local (formerly part of the Waitt Radio Networks umbrella of formats). This went on until June 2012, when the Lounge was discontinued; WLEC then went with Dial Global's America's Best Music format, which is similar to "The Lounge".

WLEC changed the music portion of its format from Adult Standards/Soft AC to Oldies in July 2020. Music programming now comes from Local Radio Networks' "Super Hits" service.
