= WFRO-FM =

Radio station in Fremont, Ohio

- Fremont, Ohio; United States
- Broadcast area: Sandusky/Port Clinton; Lake Erie Islands
- Frequency: 99.1 MHz
- Branding: Eagle 99

Programming
- Language: English
- Format: Adult contemporary

Ownership
- Owner: BAS Broadcasting
- Sister stations: WCPZ; WLEC; WMJK; WOHF

History
- First air date: 1946
- Call sign meaning: Fremont, Ohio

Technical information
- Licensing authority: FCC
- Facility ID: 73388
- Class: B1
- ERP: 11,500 watts
- HAAT: 111 meters (364 ft)
- Transmitter coordinates: 41.366°N 83.089°W

Links
- Public license information: Public file; LMS
- Webcast: Listen live
- Website: www.wfroradio.com

WFRO-FM is a commercial FM radio station, licensed to the Sandusky County seat of Fremont, Ohio. The station operates at the federally assigned frequency of 99.1 MHz, and is owned by BAS Broadcasting.

== History ==
WFRO had for much of its existence, been a combination AM and FM station, with the FM first going on the air in 1946, and the AM (at 900 kHz) coming on the air three years later. Both stations simulcast each other for a portion of the broadcast day, breaking away for separate programming during the midday hours, with the AM concentrating more on information and talk, and the FM for music.

For many years, WFRO AM broadcast a full-service MOR format heavy on local news and information; WFRO-FM played beautiful music during non-simulcast dayparts. AM 900's directional signal allowed WFRO programming to be heard clearly throughout much of southeastern Michigan (including the metropolitan Detroit area) and southwestern Ontario in addition to Ohio's North Coast region. By the 1990s, WFRO and WFRO-FM were simulcasting each other for most of the broadcast day, and WFRO's music format had evolved into a more contemporary mix of AC and adult-appeal CHR hits, but the full-service emphasis remained.

The station was founded by Wolfe Broadcasting Company, which controlled the station until 2001, when both stations were sold separately to different owners.

BAS Broadcasting purchased WFRO-FM, while ABC/Disney purchased the license to WFRO/900, but not to run it as a separate entity. ABC purchased the license as part of an initiative to move recently purchased AM 910 WFDF in Flint, Michigan to Farmington Hills (in the Detroit market). The move was made to allow AM 910 to broadcast at an increased daytime power of 50,000 watts, up substantially from 5,000 watts. WFRO-FM changed to the satellite adult contemporary format it currently airs, and WFRO/900, after a brief period of silence, returned to the air using ABC's "Real Country" format and then ESPN Radio while preparations for WFDF's move into the Detroit area were made. WFRO/900 was officially silenced forever in June 2004 when ABC surrendered the license to the FCC.

== WFRO Today ==
WFRO-FM continues as a full-service station serving Sandusky, Port Clinton, and the Lake Erie Islands (collectively known as Ohio's Vacationland region), but without many of the live and local DJs that had proliferated on the station for many years. BAS Broadcasting signed an agreement with ABC Radio/SMN's "Hits and Favorites" AC format (formerly known as Starstation), and rebranded the station as "Eagle 99", though the heritage WFRO call letters were retained.

In September 2006, WFRO and classic-rock sister station 92.1 WOHF "The Wolf" (the former WNRR "Hits 92.1"; the station has since switched to an oldies format) moved into a new 5,000-square-foot (460 m^{2}) broadcast facility in Fremont. WFRO also now operates from a new 400-foot (120 m) tower that is double the original tower's height, allowing the station to be heard clearly across Lake Erie in Monroe County, Michigan and in Essex County, Ontario while continuing to provide a strong signal to serve Fremont and the surrounding cities of Tiffin, Port Clinton, Norwalk, Sandusky, Clyde and Bellevue. In March 2009, WFRO-FM switched affiliations from ABC's (now Citadel Media) "Hits and Favorites" format over to Waitt Radio Networks' AC Pure service, but has kept ABC News Radio newscasts for both morning and afternoon drive. In 2019, local hosts returned to WFRO with Kyle Knight in middays and Russ Rutherford in afternoons.

BAS Broadcasting, owned by Jim Lorenzen and Tom Klein, also owns WMVO and WQIO in Mount Vernon, Ohio, as well as WCPZ, WMJK, WLEC, and WOHF in Sandusky. The Mount Vernon and Sandusky stations were all purchased from Clear Channel Communications.
