= WMJK =

Radio station in Clyde-Sandusky, Ohio

- Clyde, Ohio; United States
- Broadcast area: Sandusky/Port Clinton; Lake Erie Islands
- Frequency: 100.9 MHz
- Branding: Coast Country 100.9

Programming
- Language: English
- Format: Country music
- Affiliations: ABC News Radio; Cleveland Browns Radio Network; Westwood One

Ownership
- Owner: BAS Broadcasting
- Sister stations: WCPZ; WFRO-FM; WLEC; WOHF

History
- First air date: July 16, 1981
- Former call signs: WMEX (1981–85); WLCO (1985–92); WNCG (1992–98); WCPZ (1998–99)
- Call sign meaning: former "Majic" branding

Technical information
- Licensing authority: FCC
- Facility ID: 58344
- Class: A
- ERP: 3,000 watts
- HAAT: 91 meters (299 ft)
- Transmitter coordinates: 41.249°N 82.913°W

Links
- Public license information: Public file; LMS
- Webcast: Listen live
- Website: www.coast1009.com

WMJK is a commercial FM radio station serving the Sandusky, Port Clinton, and Lake Erie Islands area (collectively known as "Vacationland"). The station broadcasts with an effective radiated power of 3,000 watts at 100.9 FM and is licensed to Clyde, Ohio; about 15 miles west-southwest of Sandusky. The station is branded as "Coast Country 100.9". In January 2009, the station dropped its longtime classic rock format in favor of country music. It also serves as the "Vacationland" region affiliate of the Cleveland Browns Radio Network.

WMJK is currently owned by BAS Broadcasting. Clear Channel Communications was its former owner, but as of November 16, 2006, it has been announced for sale as part of Clear Channel's divestiture of almost 450 small and middle-market radio properties in the U.S. The cluster was sold on January 15, 2008, to Fremont-based BAS Broadcasting, and BAS took over all three stations on February 1. BAS switched 100.9 The Coast from mostly locally originating programming (outside of the Bob and Tom morning show) to Waitt Radio Networks Genuine Classic Rock satellite format. As a country station, WMJK now uses Waitt's Country Today format.

== History ==
=== As WMEX and WLCO ===
This station first signed on the air targeting the local community with a blend of middle-of-the-road music and Spanish-language programming as WMEX on July 16, 1981. The station was founded by Family Broadcasting and Communications Corporation, a company headed by Erasmo Cruz Sr. Cruz also served as the station's general manager. At that time, the station maintained studios and offices at 806 Everett Road in Fremont, Ohio. The company later changed the station's call letters to WLCO on February 21, 1985, and reduced its Spanish-language programming to 18 hours a week in favor of adult contemporary music. Studios and offices were also moved to 1859 W. McPherson Avenue in Clyde. By 1992, the station had switched its format from adult contemporary to country.

=== As WNCG ===
On February 7, 1992, Family Broadcasting and Communications entered into an agreement to sell WLCO to S & S Communications Group, Inc, a partnership headed by Toledo radio sales executive Dave Searfoss and Michigan radio programmer Kent Smith, for $280,000.

Upon acquisition of the station almost a month later, S & S Communications changed the station's format from country to 1960s and 1970s classic hits using the Satellite Music Network's "Pure Gold" format. With this change came a call letter switch to WNCG and the move of the station's studios and offices to 109 North Main Street in Clyde. In this incarnation, the station adopted the moniker "Northcoast Gold".

Both men operated WNCG under a less-is-more principle, with a small staff and with them doing much of the on-air and sales work hands-on, allowing them to dedicate revenue to the highly aggressive promotion of their station.

By this efficient means of operation, the lower-powered WNCG grew into a formidable competitor among its higher-powered competitors, largely due to its constant presence at live remote broadcasts for both paid clients and community events. WNCG also installed remote studios in various malls in its listening area, with appropriate signage, to inform listeners that they were on the air just about everywhere.

It was a venture that demonstrated long-term profitability for both Smith and Searfoss. Wishing to relocate his family to northern Michigan to purchase a station for sale there, Smith, along with Searfoss, agreed to sell WNCG on November 7, 1997, for $2.2 million to Jacor Communications. Concurrently, Smith purchased WMJZ in Gaylord, Michigan, early the following year.

=== As WCPZ and WMJK ===
Under Jacor's ownership, the station maintained its classic hits format, but in April 1998 adopted the call letters WCPZ, which had been long held by a Sandusky-based Top 40 station. The calls were switched in September 1999 to WMJK, which are retained today. Also that same year, Jacor became absorbed into Clear Channel Communications, prompting a name change for the licensee at around the same time.

The station in 2001 moved its studios and offices to 1640 Cleveland Road in Sandusky, where it remains today with sister stations WLEC and WCPZ. On June 30, 2008, Clear Channel sold WMJK and several other stations along the Lake Erie corridor to Fremont-based BAS Broadcasting. Following the change in ownership, the station dropped its "Majic" moniker (though retaining the same call letters) and adopted its current country music format.
