= WCPZ =

Radio station in Sandusky, Ohio

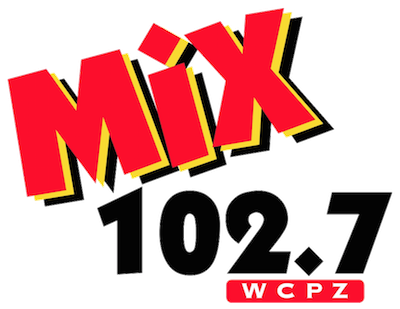
- Sandusky, Ohio; United States
- Broadcast area: Sandusky/Port Clinton; Lake Erie Islands
- Frequency: 102.7 MHz
- Branding: Mix 102.7

Programming
- Language: English
- Format: Hot adult contemporary
- Affiliations: Westwood One

Ownership
- Owner: BAS Broadcasting, Inc.
- Sister stations: WFRO-FM; WLEC; WMJK; WOHF

History
- First air date: August 15, 1959; 66 years ago
- Former call signs: WLEC-FM (1959–1980); WCPZ (1980–1998); WMTX (1998–1999); WMJK (1999)
- Call sign meaning: Cedar Point

Technical information
- Licensing authority: FCC
- Facility ID: 19706
- Class: B
- ERP: 50,000 watts
- HAAT: 135 meters (443 ft)
- Transmitter coordinates: 41°19′51″N 82°35′57″W

Links
- Public license information: Public file; LMS
- Webcast: Listen live
- Website: www.mix1027.com

WCPZ (102.7 FM) – branded Mix 102.7 – is a commercial hot adult contemporary radio station licensed to Sandusky, Ohio, serving Ohio's Vacationland region (Sandusky, Port Clinton, and the Lake Erie Islands).

The station is owned by BAS Broadcasting based in nearby Fremont, Ohio, and in addition to a standard analog transmission, the station is available online.

== History ==
The station began as WLEC-FM on August 15, 1959 and was the FM sister to AM station WLEC and was owned by the Cleveland Broadcasting Company. Owned by former Cleveland Mayor Ray T. Miller's Cleveland Broadcasting Incorporated; which also owned 1300 WERE now WJMO and 98.5 WERE now WNCX in Cleveland along with 1330 KFAC now KWKW and 92.3 KFAC now KRRL in Los Angeles. After Ray T. Miller's death in 1966, Cleveland Broadcasting Incorporated was acquired by Atlantic States Industries (ASI) for a combined $9 million in May 1968. Due to ASI already owning five AM stations and one FM station, and because of an interim policy/proposed rule by the Federal Communications Commission (FCC) that prohibited the purchase of an AM and FM station in the same market—the "one-to-a-customer" policy—the FCC ordered the divestiture of WERE-FM, along with WLEC and WLEC-FM, to a third party. While General Cinema Corporation purchased WERE-FM after a prior divestiture attempt failed, WLEC and WLEC-FM were initially sold to RadiOhio that December, but that sale was also dismissed. Both WLEC and WLEC-FM were ultimately retained by the sellers and spun off to a limited partnership, Lake Erie Broadcasting. Cleveland Broadcasting president Richard H. Miller became WLEC's general manager, then purchased both stations outright in August 1971, under the Miller Broadcasting name.

The station was purchased by Miller Broadcasting in 1972 and would become WCPZ on May 19, 1980, featuring an Album Oriented Rock format during the early and mid-1980s. Bob Bedi was the station's program director during the AOR era. In 1986 Miller Broadcasting sold both WLEC and WCPZ to Erie Broadcasting and WCPZ dropped AOR for a CHR/adult contemporary hybrid which would soon become known as Hot Adult Contemporary, which has been the station's format since. Erie Broadcasting was Headed by Cleveland's Jim Embrescia. In 1987, both WLEC and WCPZ were sold to Signal One Communications who also owned 1050 WADC now WLYQ and 99.1 WMGP now WGGE in Parkersburg for $6 Million. After three years, in May 1990, both WLEC and WCPZ were purchased by Erie Broadcasting II, Inc. for $1.5 Million. Embrescia owned several radio stations including 1520 WINW in Canton, 850 WRMR WKNR and 102.1 WDOK in Cleveland. In 1997, Embrescia attempted to sell both WLEC and WCPZ to Allur of Ohio operated by Regina Henry, but the sale was never completed and on April 30, 1997, it was announced that Jacor Communications agreed to buy both stations for $7.65 million. The sale was approved and the license transferred on June 25. In May 1999, Clear Channel Communications completed its $6.5 billion purchase of Jacor and its 454 stations, including WLEC.

Following the sale of the station to Jacor Communications in September 1997, WCPZ eventually took the "Mix" banner used by Jacor's other Hot AC stations in the region, notably the now-defunct WVMX in Cincinnati and WMVX in Cleveland. As a result, the call letters changed to WMTX on April 24, 1998, with the WCPZ calls moving to the 100.9 facility in Clyde (today WMJK). The station regained the WCPZ calls on September 9, 1999, but kept use of the "Mix" banner on all other times. WMJK-FM, licensed to Clyde, Ohio as classic rocker "100.9 The Coast" (now country station "100.9 Coast Country") along with WLEC-AM and WCPZ-FM, made up Clear Channel's Vacationland cluster, having succeeded Jacor in 1999.

On November 16, 2006, WCPZ, WLEC and WMJK were announced for sale as part of Clear Channel's divestiture of almost 450 small and middle-market radio properties in the U.S. The cluster was sold on January 15, 2008 to Fremont-based BAS Broadcasting, and BAS took over all three stations on February 1. WCPZ was expected to drop the "Mix" name following the sale, as the "Mix" moniker is used on many Clear Channel stations; however, it did not. BAS Broadcasting did, however, replace most local programming with the "AC Active" format from Waitt Radio Networks (now Dial Global Local). The morning show – hosted by longtime local radio personality Randy Hugg – remains live and local.
