= Transtar Radio Networks =

American music radio network

Transtar was the first radio network to provide 24-hour music programming to local affiliates. The slate of 24-hour networks is now owned by Westwood One. The studios were located in Valencia, California.

== History ==
Transtar was founded in 1981 by C. Terry Robinson and Bill Moyes. The network debuted at around the same time as the Satellite Music Network (SMN), based in Mokena, Illinois. Both companies marketed themselves to prospective affiliates by offering carefully selected music presented by major market talent of high quality that a local station could never afford, as well as the capability of using existing studio equipment like reel-to-reel tape decks and cartridge playback machines to help make an affordable transition. A station signing up for the service would likely need a satellite antenna and receiver, a 25 Hz tone generator to place at the end of commercial clusters at the end of a break recorded on the reel, and 25/35 Hz tone sensors to trigger local liners and station identification. The network communicated with affiliates by using a computer printer (most likely in the studio) that would keep local programming staff informed of announcer changes, closed circuit feeds, and other vital information.

While Satellite Music Network had more affiliates, Transtar offered one major advantage over SMN, a digital cue system. This was especially important among potential affiliates that were FM stations. The digital cue system allowed the network to cue tape machines at the local affiliate station with external data channels sent on a separate digital subcarrier. SMN, on the other hand, cued stations using a subaudible tone on the program feed as it was aired live, but eliminated them from being heard by listeners through filtering out the lower end of the audio signal. While the difference in audio would be negligible at worst on an AM affiliate, it was particularly obvious on an FM station subscribing to the service when a bass line heard on a particular favorite song was now found to be missing.

An engineer at the receiving station could tweak the lower end of the signal by making adjustments on the station's audio processing, allowing the missing bass line to be heard, but then the subaudible cues would, as a result, be fully audible over the air. Transtar used this as a sales tool when marketing their service to prospective affiliates, while often charging inventory on top of a monthly subscription fee, feeling that prospective affiliates would be willing to pay more for a higher quality service. On the downside, announcer shifts, because they originated on the West Coast, all began and ended in the Pacific Time Zone, which made it difficult for East Coast-based affiliates to successfully market individual announcer dayparts, particularly during the morning. This would change years later, when announcer start times were adjusted to favor Eastern and Central Time zones.

In 1989, the company merged with the United Stations Radio Network (which had already bought the RKO Radio Networks in 1985). The new company was named Unistar. That entity, in turn, was bought by Westwood One in 1993. The music networks were run as a self-branded division of Westwood One until 2006, when an agreement with Dial Global began.

== Formats formerly owned by Transtar ==
Network Ident	Format	Additional Notes
Adult Rock and Roll	Classic rock	Originally known as "Niche 29", featuring current pop hits mixed with classic rock.
America's Best Music	Adult Standards	Formerly known as "AM Only". To replace Jones Standards by September 30, 2008.
Bright AC	Hot Adult Contemporary	
Hot Country	Current Country Hits	
Hits Now!	Contemporary Hit Radio	
Kool Gold	Oldies	Formerly known as "The Oldies Channel".
Mainstream Country	Country	Includes syndicated Young and Verna morning show, a.k.a. "Your Kind of Country, The Best of the New and Gold".
S.A.M.: Simply About Music	Variety/Adult Hits	A jockless format that predates Dial Global's acquisition of the rights to Jack FM. To replace Jones Variety Hits by September 30, 2008.
Westwood One 70s	1970s music	Discontinued prior to 2000.

== Later added by Dial Global ==
Network Ident	Format	Additional Notes
Jack FM	Variety hits	Acquired from ABC Radio in 2008.
KPIG	Americana/Deep cut Classic rock/Alt-Country	Simulcast of the Freedom, California based superstation.

= Active on Dial Global affiliates
= Due to the purchase of Dial Global, Waitt, and Jones Radio Networks by Triton Media Group; consolidation is pending.

== Later added by Westwood One ==
Network Ident	Format	Additional Notes
Lite AC	Soft adult contemporary	
Classic Hip-Hop	Classic hip-hop	
