= The Lounge =

The Lounge may refer to:

- The Lounge (radio network), an adult standards radio format
- The members lounge of Virgin Australia, an airline
