= WOHF =

Radio station in Bellevue, Ohio

- Bellevue, Ohio; United States
- Broadcast area: Sandusky/Port Clinton; Lake Erie Islands
- Frequency: 92.1 MHz
- Branding: 92.1 The Wolf

Programming
- Language: English
- Format: Classic hits
- Affiliations: ABC News Radio; Ohio State Sports Network; United Stations Radio Networks; Westwood One

Ownership
- Owner: BAS Broadcasting, Inc.; (BAS Broadcasting, Inc.)
- Sister stations: WCPZ; WFRO-FM; WLEC; WMJK

History
- First air date: April 4, 1973
- Former call signs: WNRR (1973–2003)

Technical information
- Licensing authority: FCC
- Facility ID: 4625
- Class: A
- ERP: 5,800 watts
- HAAT: 103 meters (338 ft)
- Transmitter coordinates: 41°14′19.00″N 82°50′16.00″W

Links
- Public license information: Public file; LMS
- Webcast: Listen live
- Website: www.wohfradio.com

WOHF (92.1 FM, "The Wolf") is an American radio station licensed to Bellevue, Ohio, serving Ohio's Vacationland region, and featuring a classic hits music format.

The station is an affiliate of Cumulus Media's Classic Hits (formerly "Pure Gold" and "Oldies Radio") network. WOHF is part of the Sandusky, Ohio cluster of stations owned by BAS Broadcasting, and is located on North River Road in Fremont.

For many years, 92.1 FM was home to CHR/Top 40 station WNRR, known as "92.1 The Hits." In October 2003, the station was sold to BAS Broadcasting, who changed the calls to WOHF and switched the station to ABC Radio's The Classic Rock Experience format under the new moniker "The Wolf." This put the station in competition with a number of other stations in the Ohio North Coast area broadcasting locally programmed classic rock formats, including WXKR and WMJK. In the summer of 2007, BAS switched WOHF from The Classic Rock Experience to Oldies Radio.

In 2011, WOHF became the Sandusky/Port Clinton affiliate of the Rocket Sports Radio Network, broadcasting all University of Toledo football games and selected men's basketball broadcasts, as well as the coach's shows for both sports. WOHF is also an affiliate of the Ohio State Buckeyes radio network.

== History ==
=== As WNRR ===
WNRR first signed on April 4, 1973, under the ownership of John P. Bedard of Detroit, Michigan. Bellevue Mayor Phillus Robertson pressed the button to officially begin operations at 10:10 a.m. The station broadcast with 1,100 watts from studios at 106½ East Main Street in Bellevue, Ohio, with its transmitting antenna located on the roof of the building.

The original antenna, which stood 110 feet above average terrain, was destroyed in February 1974 by a severe windstorm that struck the area. The station returned to the air a week later, operating at 500 watts, and remained at that power level for several years before eventually increasing to 1,800 watts.

=== First sale ===
In 1978, the station's general manager, Robert Ladd, purchased the station from John P. Bedard for $78,000. Ladd had also been the chief advertising salesman and chief engineer since the station's inception.

WNRR began operation as a Contemporary MOR (what would now be called Hot AC) station with four local on air personalities, Bob Ladd, Bill Wise, Kim Newsom and Jim Larvic. Micheal Shay and Bob Alue worked weekends. The station featured local newscasts each hour and National news from ABC FM Network (later NBC and finally CNN).

Locally produced programs included a daily talk show called "Talkback" which evolved into one of radio's first self-help call-in shows hosted by Ladd and a daily sportscast with local newspaper sportswriter Ron Miller. High school football and basketball play by play was a mainstay, with Bellevue High School carried live and Clyde High tape delayed (the Clyde staff would not allow live broadcasts). In addition to music hosting, Ladd and Wise wrote and produced the local news. At one point, the station operated with studios in both Bellevue and Clyde, Ohio. At one point the station carried games of the Cleveland Browns, Notre Dame and the Cincinnati Reds.

WNRR went through several format changes, including one to Beautiful music around 1975 and later a year of Country before returning to Hot AC in the 1980s. Other personalities heard on WNRR included Ron Butcher, Steve Michaels (Real name: Stephen Eliot), Doctor Tim (Real name: Tim Errett), Steve Demarco, Arvin Forney, Mike Lawrence, Jeff Schlett and Rob Bultman The station became automated in the early 1990s in all dayparts except mornings where Ladd continued as morning host.

In September 1995 a fire was set by a disgruntled tenant in a rear apartment of the building housing the station. The subsequent water damaged forced the station off the air for two months until it relocated across the street. Although smoke covered, the tower and antenna were salvaged and placed on the new building. A transmitter being retired from WDIF in Marion, Ohio was purchased, and the station returned to the air with 3,800 watts placing a highly improved signal over Sandusky and Norwalk, as well as Bellevue and Clyde.

When WNRR returned to the air, it became the first and only CHR or Top 40 station in the Sandusky/Port Clinton/Lake Erie Islands region and began to see major success in ratings and acceptance by the Northern Ohio listeners. In 2000 the station broke new ground by organizing a top forty music concert at the State Theater in Sandusky, Ohio that attracted 2,100 attendees, only 1600 were allowed inside the Theater, because the maximum capacity was reached. During this time, the station was known as 92-1 The Hits.

Preparing for retirement, Bob Ladd in 2001 relocated to Southwest Florida after hosting the longest running morning show in the four county area, 29 years total.

Greg Michaels took over operation of WNRR and continued to manage the station for Ladd. Also, during this time period the station's ratings increased, showing it to be one of the top radio stations in the market, until it was sold to BAS in 2003.

=== As WOHF ===
Upon acquisition, BAS changed the call letters to WOHF, and adopted a classic rock, and later classic hits, format - all via satellite.
