= Lite AC =

Radio music format

- Type: Radio network
- Country: United States

Programming
- Format: Soft adult contemporary

Ownership
- Owner: Westwood One

History
- Launch date: July 11, 2016

Coverage
- Availability: National

Lite AC is a 24-hour soft adult contemporary music format produced by Westwood One.

Vice President/Contemporary Formats Cheri Marquardt and Director of Operations Jonathan Steele will program the format. Core artists include Billy Joel, Celine Dion, Chicago, Elton John, Fleetwood Mac and Hall and Oates. Westwood One President of Programming Kirk Stirland said affiliates wanted a softer alternative to the more upbeat AC format, and that Lite AC would be positioned between Adult Standards and AC.
