= AC Pure =

- Type: Radio network
- Country: United States
- Availability: National
- Owner: Waitt Radio Networks (through Triton Media Group)
- Key people: Chuck Denver, Christina Cooper, Dennis Anderson, Kevin Conners, Cami Carlisle
- Launch date: 2003
- Official website: AC Pure website

AC Pure was a 24-hour music format produced by Waitt Radio Networks and then by Dial Global under its Dial Global Local banner. Its playlist was composed of adult contemporary music released from the 1970s to this day from artists such as Phil Collins, Celine Dion, Rod Stewart, Gloria Estefan, Michael Bolton, etc. that mainly targeted listeners ages 25–54.

In June 2012, due to reorganizations at Dial Global, the Dial Global Local 24/7 formats were fully integrated into Dial Global's portfolio of formats, and "Dial Global Local" ceased to exist as a brand name. However, most of the former Dial Global Local formats are still offered to affiliate stations in the same manner in which they were previously offered. AC Pure continues as a Local version of Dial Global's Adult Contemporary format.

== Competitor Networks ==
- Hits & Favorites by ABC Radio Networks
