= Castaway Bay (Sandusky, Ohio) =

Indoor water park in Sandusky, Ohio

- Interactive map of Castaway Bay
- Location: Sandusky, Ohio, United States
- Coordinates: 41.4419°N 82.6771°W
- Owner: Six Flags
- Opened: November 5, 2004
- Previous names: Radisson Harbor Inn
- Operating season: Year-round
- Area: 38,000 square feet (3,500 m^{2})
- Pools: 5 pools
- Water slides: 30 water slides
- Children's areas: 5 children's areas
- Website: sixflags.com/castawaybay

Castaway Bay is a tropical-themed indoor water park resort in Sandusky, Ohio, United States. Owned by the Six Flags Entertainment Corporation, it is located near Cedar Point as part of its resort options. It opened on November 5, 2004. In addition to hotel rooms and suites, the resort features a 6,000-square-foot (560 m^{2}) game room, restaurants, retail shops, and other amenities.

== History ==
Castaway Bay originally opened in 1989 as the Radisson Harbor Inn. Cedar Fair (now Six Flags) bought a 99% share of the Radisson Harbor Inn for $2.3 million in 1996. On July 15, 2003, it was announced the company was exploring plans to refurbish the hotel into an indoor water park resort. Castaway Bay was officially announced on November 13, 2003. The property re-opened as Castaway Bay about a year later on November 5, 2004. On January 1, 2015, the TGI Fridays restaurant located inside the hotel closed. It was replaced by Quaker Steak and Lube in May. On January 31, 2025 Quaker Steak and Lube closed and was replaced by Famous Dave's which was previously located at the Cedar Point Marina. The new Famous Dave's opened on May 16, 2025.

For 2022, the water park is undergoing a renovation with new branding across the property, including renovated rooms, and common spaces. The park introduced a set of mascots to promote the water park, including Gordy the turtle, who is included in the new version of the Castaway Bay logo.

== Dining ==
Castaway Bay has 5 dining options, Big Daddy's Snack Shack which is located inside the Waterpark, Ebb & Eddy's, Bay Harbor, Famous Dave's (formerly a Quaker Steak & Lube and TGI Fridays), and a breakfast buffet; Mango Mike's.

== Slides and attractions ==
Name	Description	Height requirement
Cargo Crossing	An interactive play area in which guests have to cross a pool of water using floating lily pads and a cargo net.	Must be 46 inches tall in bare feet or accompanied by a responsible person. Lifejackets are required for guests less than 52 inches.
Air Racer Rally	Three indoor enclosed body slides that travel outside the building and come back in. Formerly called Tropical Tube Slides.	Must be at least 48 inches tall in bare feet.
Castawave Pool	A 100,000-gallon wave pool that generates 3-foot-tall waves which guests can body surf. Formerly called Castaway Bay Wave Pool (2004-2022)	Guests under 52 inches and weak or non-swimmers must wear a lifejacket. Guests less than 42 inches tall must also be accompanied by a responsible person
Fernando's Tadpole Pool	A children's play pool with a tandem slide, water pipes, spraying gadgets and sea creature play structures designed especially for kids. Formerly called Toddler's Tide Pool (2004-2022).	Must be less than 52 inches tall in bare feet or accompanied by a child.
Gordy's Getaway	Two 50-person whirlpool spas – one indoor and one outdoor. Formerly called The Grotto (2004-2022).	5 years old or older
Hank's Hangout	A multi-story interactive play area with more than 100 different elements, including a 1,000-gallon tipping bucket that drenches guests every two minutes with a downpour of water; it also includes four slides. Formerly called Lookout Lagoon Family Funhouse (2004-2022).	Must be 40 inches tall in bare feet to ride slides 8 feet in the air or higher. Must be between 36 and 48 inches tall in bare feet to ride on any slides lower than 8 feet in the air.
Pierce's Play Pool	A pool area that offers basketball hoops and numerous flotation devices. Formerly called Creature Cove (2004-2022).	Must be 42 inches tall in bare feet or accompanied by a responsible person. Lifejackets are required for guests less than 54 inches.
Rocket's Canopy Coaster	A 35 feet (11 m) high, 520 feet (160 m) long water roller coaster that propels riders uphill using water jets. This unique water coaster twists its way through the waterpark, shoots outside the resort's structure in an enclosed slide and then spirals back into the complex. Formerly called Rendezvous Run (2004-2022).	Must be 42 inches tall in bare feet.
School Crossing	Rope course play area	Must be 42 inches tall in bare feet or accompanied by a responsible person. Lifejackets are required for guests less than 54 inches.

== See also ==
- Cedar Point
- List of Six Flags water parks
