= America's Best Music =

Adult standard and soft oldies music format

- Type: Radio network
- Country: United States
- Availability: National
- Owner: Westwood One
- Launch date: 1987
- Former names: AM Only
- Official website: America's Best Music website

America's Best Music is the on-air branding of a soft oldies and adult standards 24-hour radio network, formerly known as AM Only. The service is syndicated by Westwood One, a subsidiary of Cumulus Media. It was one of the original Transtar Radio Networks formats. Despite its old name of AM Only, "America's Best Music" is no longer exclusive to AM stations and is carried on some FM stations.

Its main competitor is Music of Your Life, syndicated by Planet Halo, Inc. Until 2010, Timeless from Citadel/ABC Radio had been another similar format.

The target audience of the format is listeners 35 to 64, with a range of softer hits, primarily from the 1950s through the 1980s, plus a few newer titles in the playlist. Artists include The Beatles, Celine Dion, Elvis Presley, Dionne Warwick, Neil Diamond, Billy Joel, Frank Sinatra, Barbra Streisand, The Carpenters, Lionel Richie, Barry Manilow, James Taylor, Elton John, Anne Murray, Simon and Garfunkel, Andy Williams, Linda Ronstadt, Natalie Cole, Nat King Cole, The Captain & Tennille, and The 5th Dimension. The format also incorporates "new standards" material by artists like Norah Jones, Diana Krall, Michael Bublé, Rod Stewart, Bette Midler and Carly Simon. An occasional newer song is heard if it has adult appeal, such as some recent hits by Adele. Also, the network switches to all Christmas music beginning in mid-December through Christmas Day each year.

== History ==
"AM Only" was created by Transtar Radio Networks at a time when FM had overtaken AM for listeners seeking music on the radio. Most AM stations that had previously programmed formats such as Top 40, adult contemporary and country music saw their listeners switch to FM stations. These stations were in search of a format for mature listeners who were content with hearing music on AM radio, especially if the station played songs that FM stations thought was too old or conservative. "AM Only" was promoted exclusively to AM stations, though it was not long before some FM stations used it as well.

The format was promoted on-air as "Great Songs, Great Memories," and it continues to use that slogan to this day. One affiliate used an ad which stated:

Ray Charles lives here. So does Rosemary Clooney, Perry Como, Bing Crosby, The Lettermen, and The Nelson Riddle Orchestra. At KVIN, Vintage 920 The Vine, we play the original hits of the 40s, 50s and 60s. All day, every day.

After a February 1987 debut with Chick Watkins as program director, "AM Only" had 157 network affiliates by the end of 1993. Growth of the format was helped by new material from Frank Sinatra and Johnny Mathis, and artists such as Harry Connick Jr., along with movies such as Sleepless in Seattle. KJUL jumped to number 3 in the Las Vegas market, and KOY became the number 5 station in Phoenix, Arizona.

In 2000, over 240 radio stations used the adult standards format which was being distributed by this time by Westwood One.

In the first decade of the 21st Century, the format added more uptempo material from the oldies and adult contemporary formats and promoted "A New Variety of America's Best Music".

On October 1, 2008, America's Best Music absorbed Jones Standards, a short-lived format created by the now-dissolved Jones Radio Networks, as a result of Jones's purchase by Westwood One. Many, though not all, Jones Standards affiliates switched over to America's Best Music. Westwood One's subsequent purchase of Waitt Radio Networks added a second adult standards/MOR-based format to the syndicator's portfolio in the form of "The Lounge", formerly distributed by Waitt and now discontinued.

In July 2015 it was announced that all the on-air personalities would be terminated as Westwood One downsized its air staff. Original morning show host Jeff Rollins and afternoon host and production director Carl Hampton were terminated as well as fellow weekday voice John Gleason, plus weekenders Pat McNulty, Wayne Yafee and Paul Worden. Rollins returned to the air, hosting mornings at WOSN, Ocean-FM, in Indian River Shores, Florida.

Former DJs included Dick Heatherton, Nick Gerard, Ed Brand, Joe Daniels, Mark Haden, Rick Wagstaff, Rick Garza, Lou Simon, and Peter Doeblin. Chick Watkins, the format's former program director, was also a DJ for many years.

As of 2025, America's Best Music was the last of Westwood One's 24/7 networks to include a substantial portion of pop music from prior to the 1970s, after it shut down Good Time Oldies and Classic Hits Gold, two other networks that had a substantial 1960s component, in April of that year. (Two classic country networks also continue to carry some 1960s material, and its classic rock outlet maintains a small amount.)

== Sample Hour of Music (2019) ==
- "How Important Can It Be?" - Joni James
- "Then Came You" - Dionne Warwick and The Spinners
- "For the First Time" - Kenny Loggins
- "Top of the World" - The Carpenters
- "(Sittin' On) The Dock of the Bay" - Otis Redding
- "Kentucky Rain" - Elvis Presley
- "My Heart Stood Still" - Rod Stewart
- "He Don't Love You (Like I Love You)" - Tony Orlando and Dawn
- "Midnight at the Oasis" - Maria Muldaur
- "My Way" - Frank Sinatra
- "This Masquerade" - George Benson
- "Don't Ask Me Why" - Billy Joel
- "It's Too Late" - Carole King
- "Sunny" - Bobby Hebb
