= John Jay Barber =

American painter

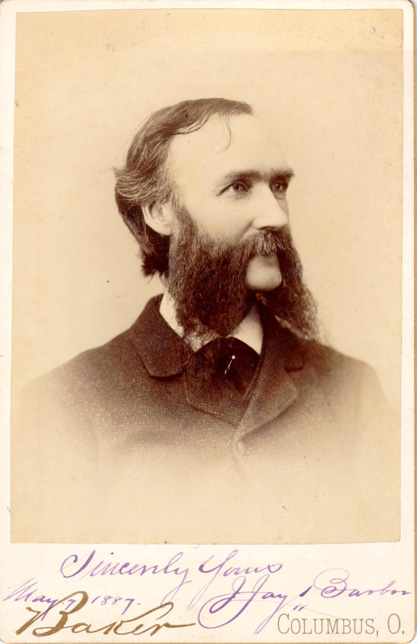
- Born: September 21, 1840; Sandusky
- Died: November 27, 1910 (aged 70); Columbus State Hospital
- Occupation: Painter

John Jay Barber (September 21, 1840 – November 27, 1910) was an American painter.

John Jay Barber was born on September 21, 1840, in Sandusky, Ohio. He studied law, was admitted to the bar in 1862, joined the volunteer army during the American Civil War in 1863, returned sick, and upon recovery determined to devote himself to painting. He received no instruction in art, but settled in Columbus, Ohio, in 1871, and opened a studio. He devoted himself at first to landscapes, delineating scenes in the Muskingum valley. Subsequently, he executed cattle pieces, and after 1881 exhibited in the National Academy in New York. In 1881 he painted the Elysium of the Herd; in 1882, Pride of Eastwood Jerseys and A Thirsty Party; in 1883, The Thirsty Herd and Jersey Herd; in 1884, The Passing Shower and In Pastures Green; in 1885, The Cool Retreat.

In 1910, Barber was interred in the Columbus State Hospital due to mental illness attributed to injuries from a fall in the previous April. He committed suicide there with a razor and died on November 27, 1910.
