= Sandusky, Ohio =

City in Erie County, Ohio, United States

- City
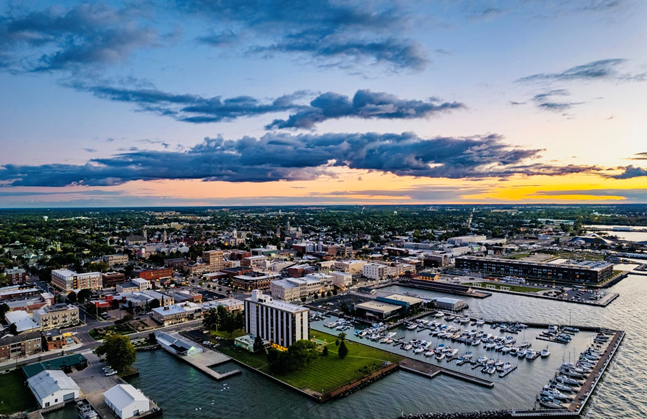
- Downtown Sandusky

- Flag Seal
- Nickname: "Home of Cedar Point"
- Interactive map of Sandusky, Ohio
- Location within Ohio Location within the United States
- Coordinates: 41°27′20″N 82°42′50″W
- Country: United States
- State: Ohio
- County: Erie
- Founded: 1818

Government
  - City Manager: John Orzech Jr.

Area
  - City: 21.83 sq mi (56.53 km^{2})
  - Land: 9.64 sq mi (24.96 km^{2})
  - Water: 12.19 sq mi (31.58 km^{2})
- Elevation: 584 ft (178 m)

Population (2020)
  - City: 25,095
  - Density: 2,604.4/sq mi (1,005.58/km^{2})
  - Metro: 115,986
- Time zone: UTC−05:00 (EST)
  - Summer (DST): UTC−04:00 (EDT)
- ZIP Codes: 44870 & 44871
- Area code: 419/567
- FIPS code: 39-70380
- GNIS feature ID: 1086070
- Website: www.cityofsandusky.com

Sandusky (/sænˈdʌski/ san-DUSS-kee) is a city in Erie County, Ohio, United States, and its county seat. Situated on the southern shore of Lake Erie, Sandusky is located roughly midway between Toledo (45 miles (72 km) west) and Cleveland (50 miles (80 km) east). At the 2020 census, the city had a population of 25,095, and the Sandusky metropolitan area had 115,986 residents.

Sandusky was established in the early 19th century and developed as a port city at the head of Sandusky Bay. It is home to Cedar Point, one of the most popular amusement parks in the world, as well as water parks including Cedar Point Shores, Castaway Bay, Great Wolf Lodge, and Kalahari. The owner of Cedar Point, Six Flags Entertainment Corporation, is the largest employer of Sandusky and maintains significant administrative operations within the city.

== Etymology ==
The accepted etymology is that the name "Sandusky" is derived from the Wyandot word saundustee, meaning "water" or andusti, "cold water". In his 1734 history of New France, Charlevoix transliterated the word as "Chinouski". Sandusky Bay, formed at the mouth of the Sandusky River, is identified as "Lac (Lake) Sandouské" on a 1718 map by Guillaume DeLisle. The name "L.(Lac) Sandoski" appears on a 1733 map. Sandusky Bay was also called Lac Ondaské, in another French transliteration of the Wyandot.

The river and bay gave rise to a number of eponymous forts and settlements along their shores. These consisted of the short-lived English trading post Fort Sandusky north of the bay, the French Fort Sandoské that replaced it, the British Fort Sandusky on the south shore of the bay, the American Fort Sandusky (later Fort Stephenson) upriver at Lower Sandusky (now known as Fremont, Ohio), as well as the Wyandot Indian village of Upper Sandusky farther upriver.

Another, less accepted etymologic version claims that the city's name goes back to a Polish–American trader and frontiersman named Anthony Sadowski, a neighbor of the Boone family and co-founder of Amity village. He was employed by the governor of then British Pennsylvania as a trader and interpreter, speaking several Indian languages, especially Iroquois. He moved to the Pennsylvania frontier in January 1712 and could easily have made it to Lake Erie by 1718 to establish a trading post. One genealogical line of his descendants is actually called "Sandusky".

== History ==
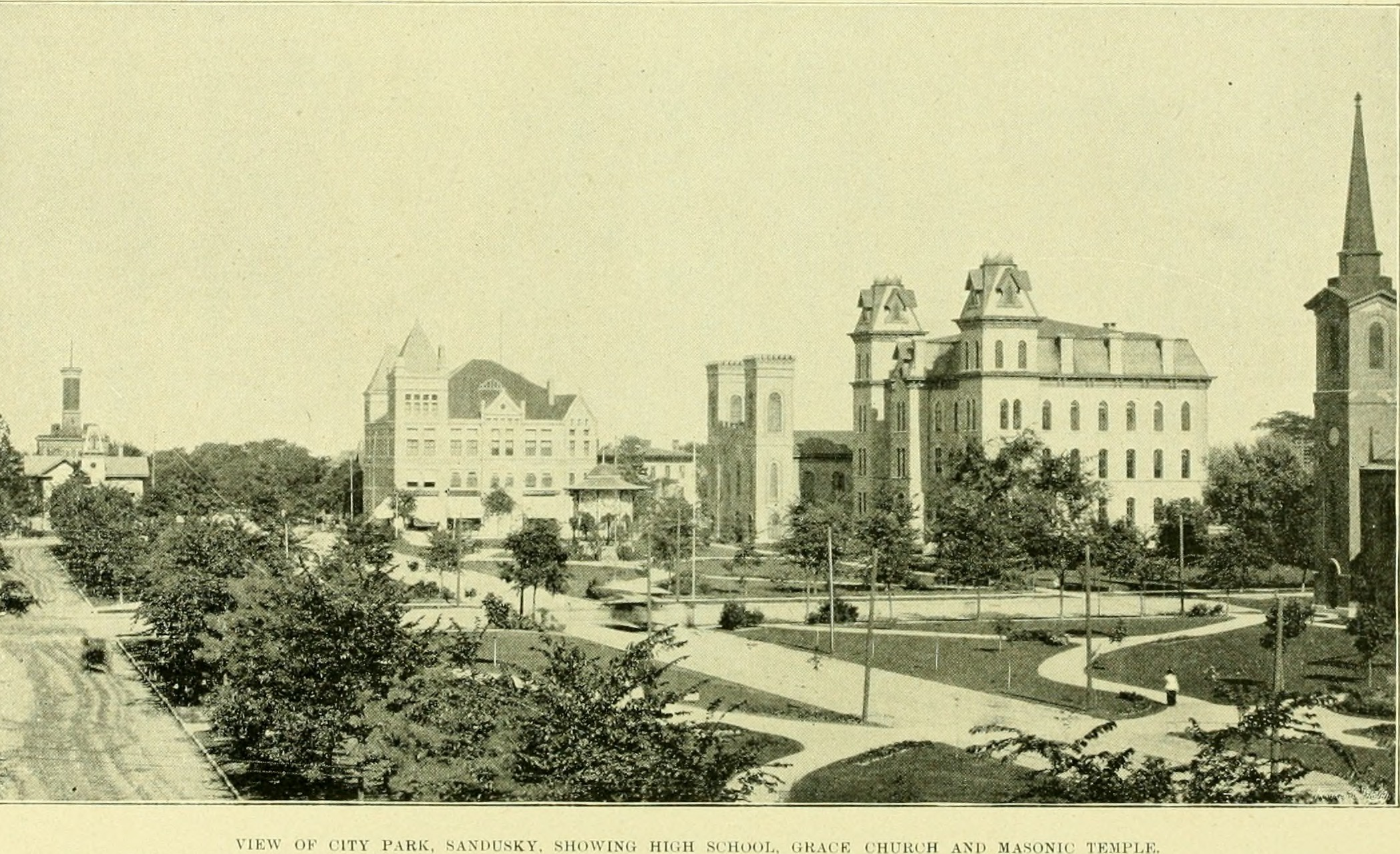
The view of city park in 1897

=== 18th century ===
This area was a center of trading and fortifications since the 18th century: the English, French, and Americans had trading posts and forts built on both the north and south sides of Sandusky Bay.

=== 19th century ===
George Croghan was one of the more prominent men who operated in this area in the 18th century. A federal fur trade factory was established in 1808 but was lost at the beginning of the War of 1812.

Development by European Americans of the city of Sandusky, starting in 1818, on the southeast shore of Sandusky Bay, followed settlement of the war of 1812. Part of the city quickly enveloped the site of an earlier small village named Portland (established about 1816). Sandusky was incorporated as a city in 1824. Eventually the city of Sandusky encompassed most of the entire township that had been called Portland. Some of the city was built on land formerly occupied by a Native American man named Ogontz, and therefore the city is said to have been built on "Ogontz' place".

Sandusky's rise in the 19th century was heavily influenced by its location at the head of Sandusky Bay. This made it a key point both for the movement of goods and for the movement of people. The mild climate caused by its proximity to Lake Erie also caused it to become the center of Ohio's wine industry. The presence of limestone was also important in its development. It was also a key location for ice harvesting in the 19th century. Lumber transport, stone quarrying and, in the early 20th century, manufacturing, have all contributed to the city's economic development.

Prior to the abolition of slavery in the United States, Sandusky was a stop for refugee slaves on the Underground Railroad, as some would travel across Lake Erie to reach freedom in Canada. Although Ohio was a free state, they felt at risk from slavecatchers because of bonuses offered under the Fugitive Slave Act of 1850. As depicted in Harriet Beecher Stowe's novel Uncle Tom's Cabin (1855), many refugee slaves seeking to get to Canada made their way to Sandusky, where they boarded boats crossing Lake Erie to the port of Amherstburg in Ontario.

Sandusky's original plat was designed by surveyor Hector Kilbourne according to a modified grid plan, known today as the Kilbourne Plat. Kilbourne later became the first Worshipful Master of the first Sandusky Masonic Lodge, known as Science Lodge #50, still in operation on Wayne Street. His design featured a street grid with avenues cutting diagonally to create patterns reminiscent of the symbols of Freemasonry.

On September 17, 1835, Sandusky was the site of groundbreaking for the Mad River and Lake Erie Railroad, which brought change to the town. Industrial areas developed near the railroad and goods were transported through the port. The coal docks located west of downtown still use a portion of the original MR&LE right-of-way. In 1838, Erie County, Ohio was formed by the state legislature and Sandusky was designated the county seat. This led to the foundation of a court house and Sandusky becoming a regional government center. In 1846 Sandusky had a population of approximately 3,000 people. At that point Sandusky had two railroads and was also a main focus of lake traffic. The town then consisted of many stores, two printing offices, two machine shops, two banks, six churches, one high school, and several iron furnaces.

The English author Charles Dickens visited the city in 1842, and briefly wrote of it in his subsequent travelogue, American Notes. Said Dickens, who rode the newly constructed MR&LE railroad from Tiffin:

At two o'clock we took the railroad; the travelling-on which was very slow, its construction being indifferent, and the ground wet and marshy; and arrived at Sandusky in time to dine that evening. We put up at a comfortable little hotel on the brink of Lake Erie, lay there that night, and had no choice but to wait there next day, until a steamboat bound for Buffalo appeared. The town, which was sluggish and uninteresting enough, was something like the back of an English watering-place out of the season.

By 1880, Sandusky had risen to a population of 16,000. There were then 20 churches and three newspapers in the community. The city boasted 29 businesses with at least 10 employees. Products being produced included lime, railroad locomotives and cars, carriages, wheels, crayons, chalk, beer, paper, baskets, and tools. By 1886 Sandusky was the center of wood wheel manufacture in the United States. It was also the location of the Ohio State Fish hatchery and the Ohio Soldiers and Sailor's Home.

=== 20th century ===
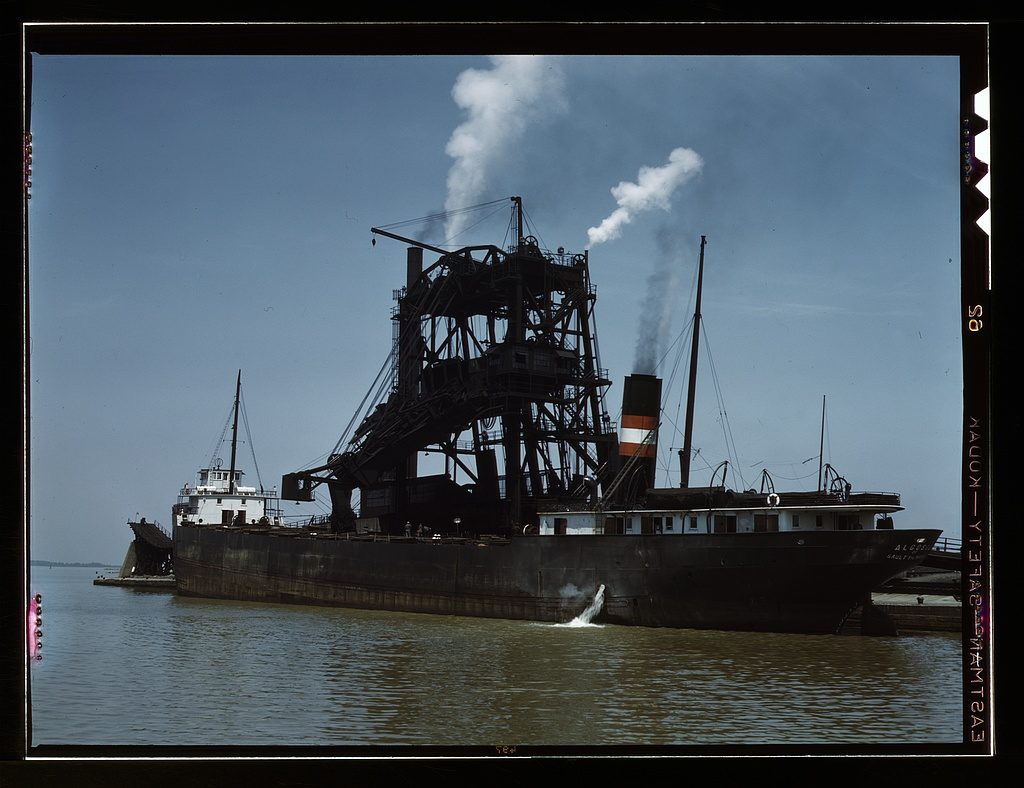
Loading coal into a freighter at one of the Pennsylvania Railroad docks in Sandusky in 1943

The city developed as a center of paper-making. With a mill in the industrial area near the lake, the Hinde & Dauch Paper Company was the largest employer in the city in the early 1900s.

As the 20th century progressed, the economy of Sandusky came to focus mainly on tourism and fishing. Since the late 20th century, Battery Park Marina was developed on the original site of the MR&LE Railroad after restructuring of the industry reduced traffic on the line. The tracks that ran through downtown Sandusky have since been removed. Most of the downtown industrial area is also being redeveloped for other purposes, including mainly marina dockage.

The National Arbor Day Foundation has designated Sandusky as a Tree City USA.

== Geography ==
=== Geography ===
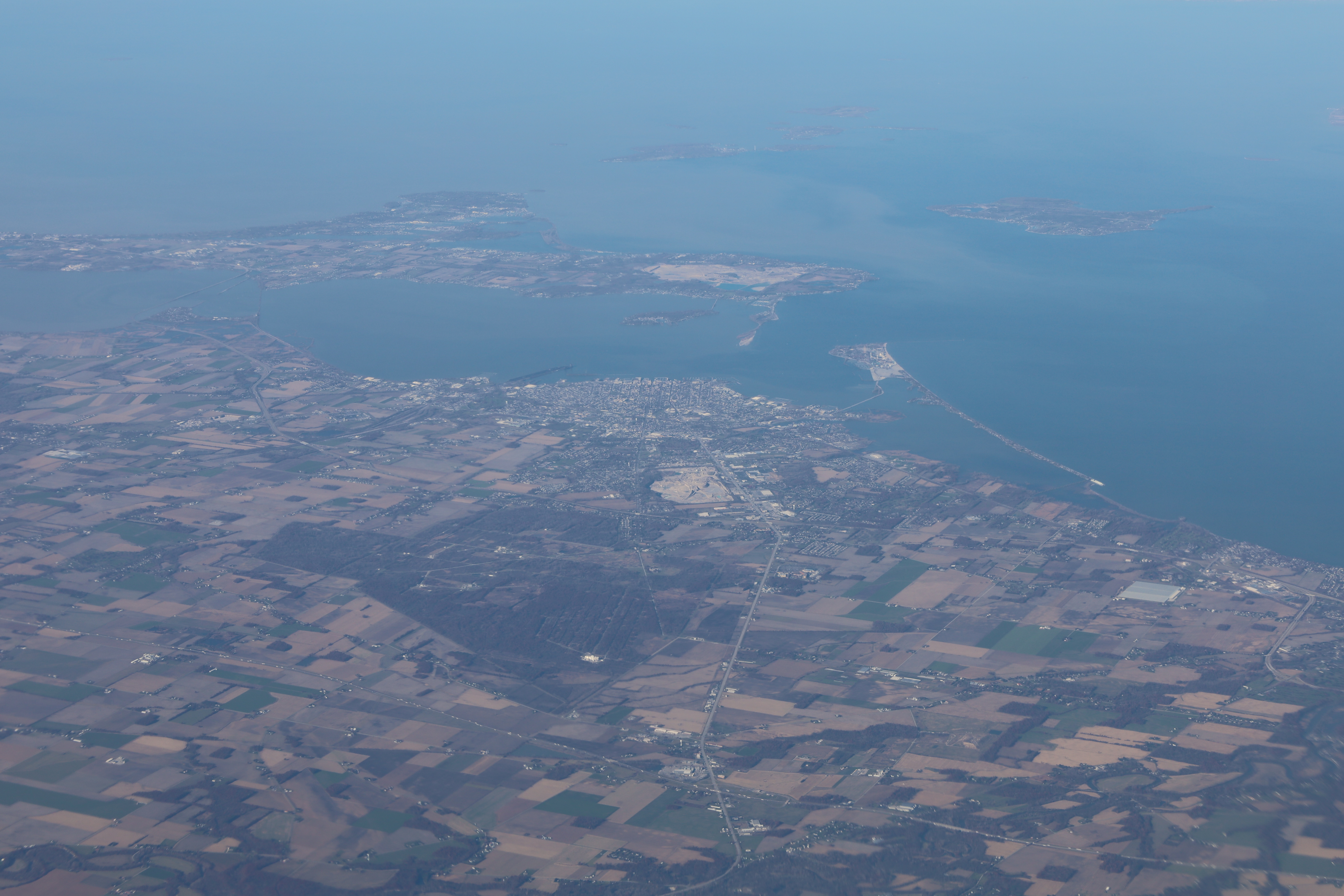
Aerial view in 2021

According to the United States Census Bureau, the city has a total area of 21.91 square miles (56.75 km^{2}), of which 9.73 square miles (25.20 km^{2}) is land and 12.18 square miles (31.55 km^{2}) is water.

Sandusky occupies the defunct township Portland and borders the following townships:

- Margaretta Township — west and south
- Perkins Township — south
- Huron Township — east

=== Climate ===
Sandusky has a humid continental climate (Köppen climate classification Dfa), typical of the Midwestern United States, with warm summers and cold winters. Winters tend to be cold, with an average January high temperature of 32 °F (0 °C), and an average January low temperature of 19 °F (−7 °C), with considerable variation in temperatures. Sandusky averages 23.3 inches (59 cm) of snow per winter. Summers tend to be warm with an average July high temperature of 82 °F (28 °C), and an average July low temperature of 66 °F (19 °C). Summer weather is more stable, generally humid with thunderstorms. Fall usually is the driest season with many clear warm days and cool nights.

The highest recorded temperature in Sandusky of 105 °F (41 °C) was set on July 14, 1936, and the lowest recorded temperature of −20 °F (−29 °C) was set on January 19, 1994.

Climate data for Sandusky, Ohio (1991–2020 normals, extremes 1896–present)
Month	Jan	Feb	Mar	Apr	May	Jun	Jul	Aug	Sep	Oct	Nov	Dec	Year
Record high °F (°C)	73 (23)	75 (24)	85 (29)	90 (32)	93 (34)	104 (40)	105 (41)	105 (41)	99 (37)	93 (34)	82 (28)	73 (23)	105 (41)
Mean daily maximum °F (°C)	34.4 (1.3)	37.0 (2.8)	45.0 (7.2)	57.3 (14.1)	68.5 (20.3)	78.1 (25.6)	82.3 (27.9)	80.5 (26.9)	74.5 (23.6)	63.0 (17.2)	50.1 (10.1)	39.3 (4.1)	59.2 (15.1)
Daily mean °F (°C)	28.1 (−2.2)	30.2 (−1.0)	38.0 (3.3)	49.3 (9.6)	60.8 (16.0)	70.8 (21.6)	74.7 (23.7)	73.2 (22.9)	66.7 (19.3)	55.3 (12.9)	43.5 (6.4)	33.6 (0.9)	52.0 (11.1)
Mean daily minimum °F (°C)	21.8 (−5.7)	23.4 (−4.8)	30.9 (−0.6)	41.3 (5.2)	53.2 (11.8)	63.4 (17.4)	67.2 (19.6)	65.8 (18.8)	58.9 (14.9)	47.6 (8.7)	36.8 (2.7)	27.8 (−2.3)	44.8 (7.1)
Record low °F (°C)	−20 (−29)	−15 (−26)	−7 (−22)	14 (−10)	30 (−1)	41 (5)	41 (5)	45 (7)	34 (1)	22 (−6)	3 (−16)	−16 (−27)	−20 (−29)
Average precipitation inches (mm)	1.90 (48)	1.77 (45)	2.56 (65)	3.76 (96)	3.25 (83)	3.67 (93)	3.55 (90)	3.02 (77)	3.07 (78)	2.72 (69)	2.64 (67)	2.12 (54)	34.03 (864)
Average snowfall inches (cm)	5.4 (14)	4.1 (10)	2.7 (6.9)	0.6 (1.5)	0.0 (0.0)	0.0 (0.0)	0.0 (0.0)	0.0 (0.0)	0.0 (0.0)	0.0 (0.0)	0.1 (0.25)	3.3 (8.4)	16.2 (41)
Average precipitation days (≥ 0.01 in)	10.6	10.1	12.2	13.1	13.3	12.1	9.8	9.7	10.0	11.8	11.1	11.7	135.5
Average snowy days (≥ 0.1 in)	3.8	2.3	1.4	0.2	0.0	0.0	0.0	0.0	0.0	0.0	0.1	1.9	9.7
Source: NOAA (snow 1981–2010)

=== Local areas ===
Historically, the Wyandot used the term andoske to refer to the river, the bay, and the general area where the city of "Sandusky" later developed. This practice was also used by French and English settlers in the area. Often in historical documents, the word "Sandusky" is used without clarification as to which specific site or location is being referred to. Historical references to "Sandusky" might mean any one of the following locations, depending also on the date of the reference.

List of locations, with approximate dates of usage:

- Sandusky/Sandusky City - about 1817* to present, village/city on southeast side of Sandusky Bay (*-any "Sandusky" reference dated prior to 1817 would not refer to this village, as it was not officially established by this name until 1818).
- Sandusky Bay - 1700 to present; early variants were "(Lac d')Otsanderket", "(Lac d')Otsandoske", "Lake Sandoskė".
- Sandusky River - 1740s to present.
- Fort Sandusky - various locations: c. 1745, an English trading post on the northern side of the bay. c.1754, a French fort ("Fort Janundat") was built on the southern side of the bay. Later in the French and Indian War, the British built Fort Sandusky on the southeastern side of Sandusky Bay. From about 1812/1813, this referred to a fort (later called "Fort Stephenson") on the Sandusky River, near present-day Fremont, Ohio.
- Lower Sandusky - 1760s to 1849, area or village at the site of what is now the city of Fremont.
- Upper Sandusky - 1760s? to present, area or village at the falls, which later developed as the current city of Upper Sandusky. Upper Sandusky is south of Sandusky and upriver of it. While a common first impression is that "Upper" implies "north of", here "Upper" refers to "upstream", as in upstream of Lake Erie by means of the Sandusky River.
- Upper Sandusky Old Town - 1760s? to ?, a historic Wyandot (Huron) tribe village, about 12 miles (19 km) north of where the city of Upper Sandusky developed.
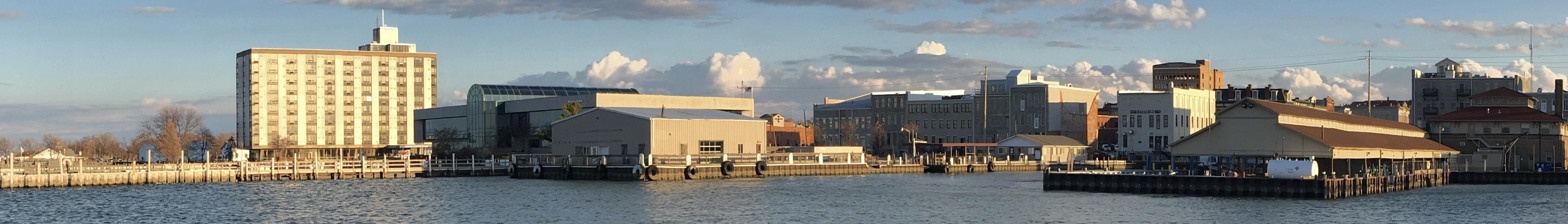
Downtown Sandusky

== Demographics ==
Historical population
Census	Pop.	Note	%±
1830	593		—
1840	1,433		141.7%
1850	5,087		255.0%
1860	8,408		65.3%
1870	13,000		54.6%
1880	15,838		21.8%
1890	18,471		16.6%
1900	19,664		6.5%
1910	19,989		1.7%
1920	22,897		14.5%
1930	24,022		4.9%
1940	24,874		3.5%
1950	29,375		18.1%
1960	31,989		8.9%
1970	32,674		2.1%
1980	31,360		−4.0%
1990	29,764		−5.1%
2000	27,844		−6.5%
2010	25,793		−7.4%
2020	25,095		−2.7%

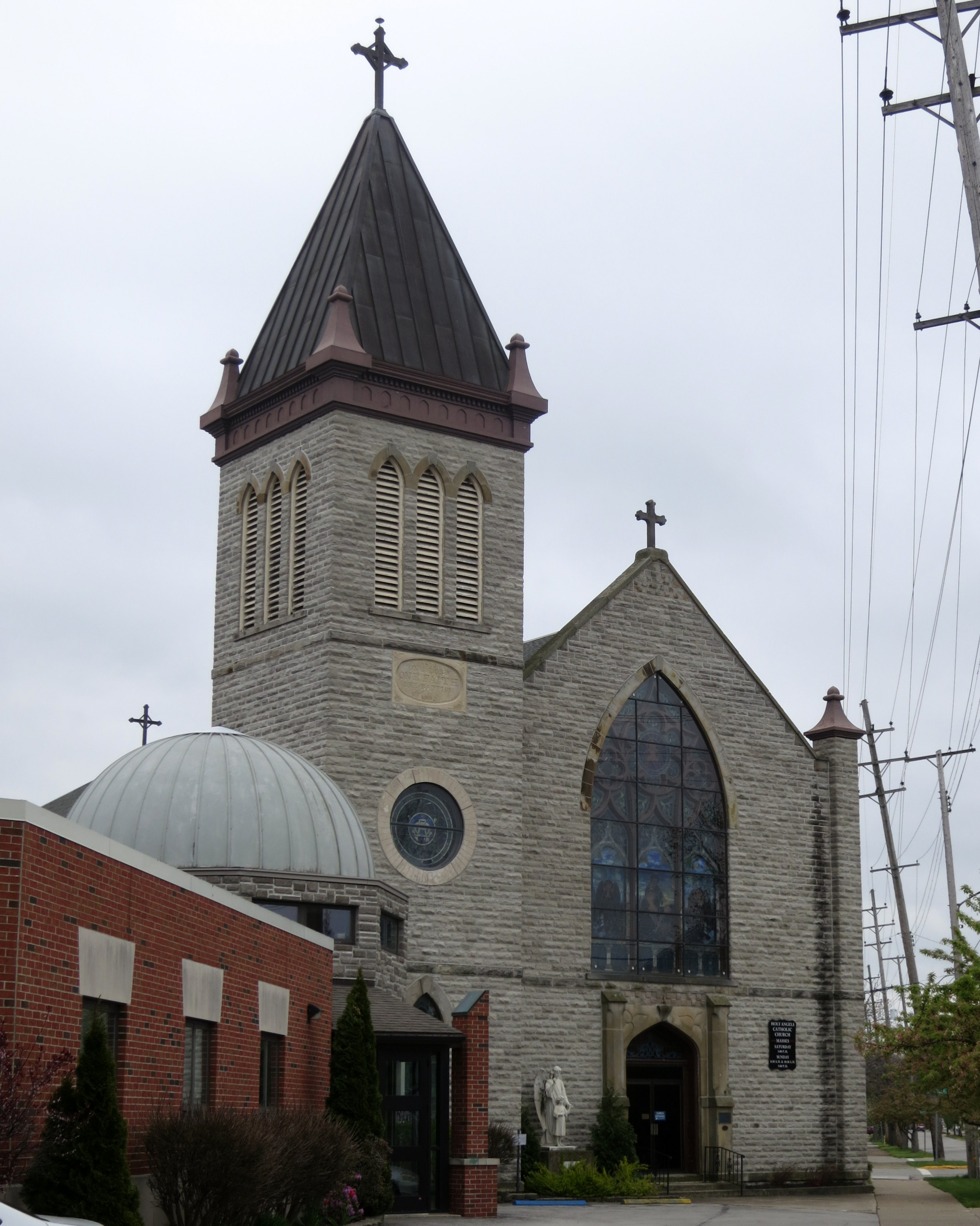
Holy Angels Catholic Church

=== 2020 census ===
As of the 2020 census, Sandusky had a population of 25,095 and a median age of 39.5 years. 22.4% of residents were under the age of 18 and 18.4% of residents were 65 years of age or older. For every 100 females there were 91.2 males, and for every 100 females age 18 and over there were 88.1 males age 18 and over.

100.0% of residents lived in urban areas, while 0.0% lived in rural areas.

There were 11,124 households in Sandusky, of which 25.5% had children under the age of 18 living in them. Of all households, 27.5% were married-couple households, 24.4% were households with a male householder and no spouse or partner present, and 38.5% were households with a female householder and no spouse or partner present. About 39.0% of all households were made up of individuals and 15.3% had someone living alone who was 65 years of age or older.

There were 13,351 housing units, of which 16.7% were vacant. The homeowner vacancy rate was 2.3% and the rental vacancy rate was 9.5%.

Racial composition as of the 2020 census
Race	Number	Percent
White	16,014	63.8%
Black or African American	5,864	23.4%
American Indian and Alaska Native	93	0.4%
Asian	105	0.4%
Native Hawaiian and Other Pacific Islander	4	0.0%
Some other race	457	1.8%
Two or more races	2,558	10.2%
Hispanic or Latino (of any race)	1,453	5.8%

=== 2010 census ===
Largest ancestries (2010)	Percent
German	34.4%
Irish	15.9%
English	8.4%
Italian	6.8%
American	3.7%

As of the census of 2010, there were 25,793 people, 11,082 households, and 6,415 families residing in the city. The population density was 2,650.9 inhabitants per square mile (1,023.5/km^{2}). There were 13,386 housing units at an average density of 1,375.7 units per square mile (531.2 units/km^{2}). The racial makeup of the city was 70.4% White, 22.0% African American, 0.4% Native American, 0.6% Asian, 1.1% from other races, and 5.5% from two or more races. Hispanic or Latino of any race were 4.9% of the population.

There were 11,082 households, of which 29.4% had children under the age of 18 living with them, 32.9% were married couples living together, 19.7% had a female householder with no husband present, 5.2% had a male householder with no wife present, and 42.1% were non-families. 35.1% of all households were made up of individuals, and 12.1% had someone living alone who was 65 years of age or older. The average household size was 2.28 and the average family size was 2.93.

The median age in the city was 38.5 years. 23.9% of residents were under the age of 18; 9.3% were between the ages of 18 and 24; 24.2% were from 25 to 44; 27.7% were from 45 to 64; and 15% were 65 years of age or older. The gender makeup of the city was 47.6% male and 52.4% female.

=== 2000 census ===
Largest ancestries (2000)	Percent
German	32.1%
Irish	12.4%
English	7.8%
Italian	7.4%
American	6.7%

As of the census of 2000, there were 27,844 people, 11,851 households, and 7,039 families residing in the city. The population density was 2,770.5 inhabitants per square mile (1,069.7/km^{2}). There were 13,323 housing units at an average density of 1,325.7 units per square mile (511.9 units/km^{2}). The racial makeup of the city was 74.50% White, 21.08% African American, 0.29% Native American, 0.26% Asian, 0.01% Pacific Islander, 0.97% from other races, and 2.88% from two or more races. Hispanic or Latino of any race were 3.09% of the population.

There were 11,851 households, out of which 28.9% had children under the age of 18 living with them, 38.7% were married couples living together, 16.4% had a female householder with no husband present, and 40.6% were non-families. 34.9% of all households were made up of individuals, and 13.1% had someone living alone who was 65 years of age or older. The average household size was 2.31 and the average family size was 2.99.

In the city the population was spread out, with 25.8% under the age of 18, 9.2% from 18 to 24, 28.5% from 25 to 44, 21.4% from 45 to 64, and 15.1% who were 65 years of age or older. The median age was 36 years. For every 100 females, there were 89.4 males. For every 100 females age 18 and over, there were 85.2 males.

The median income for a household in the city was $31,133, and the median income for a family was $37,749. Males had a median income of $31,269 versus $21,926 for females. The per capita income for the city was $18,111. About 12.2% of families and 15.3% of the population were below the poverty line, including 22.7% of those under age 18 and 10.2% of those age 65 or over.

== Economy ==
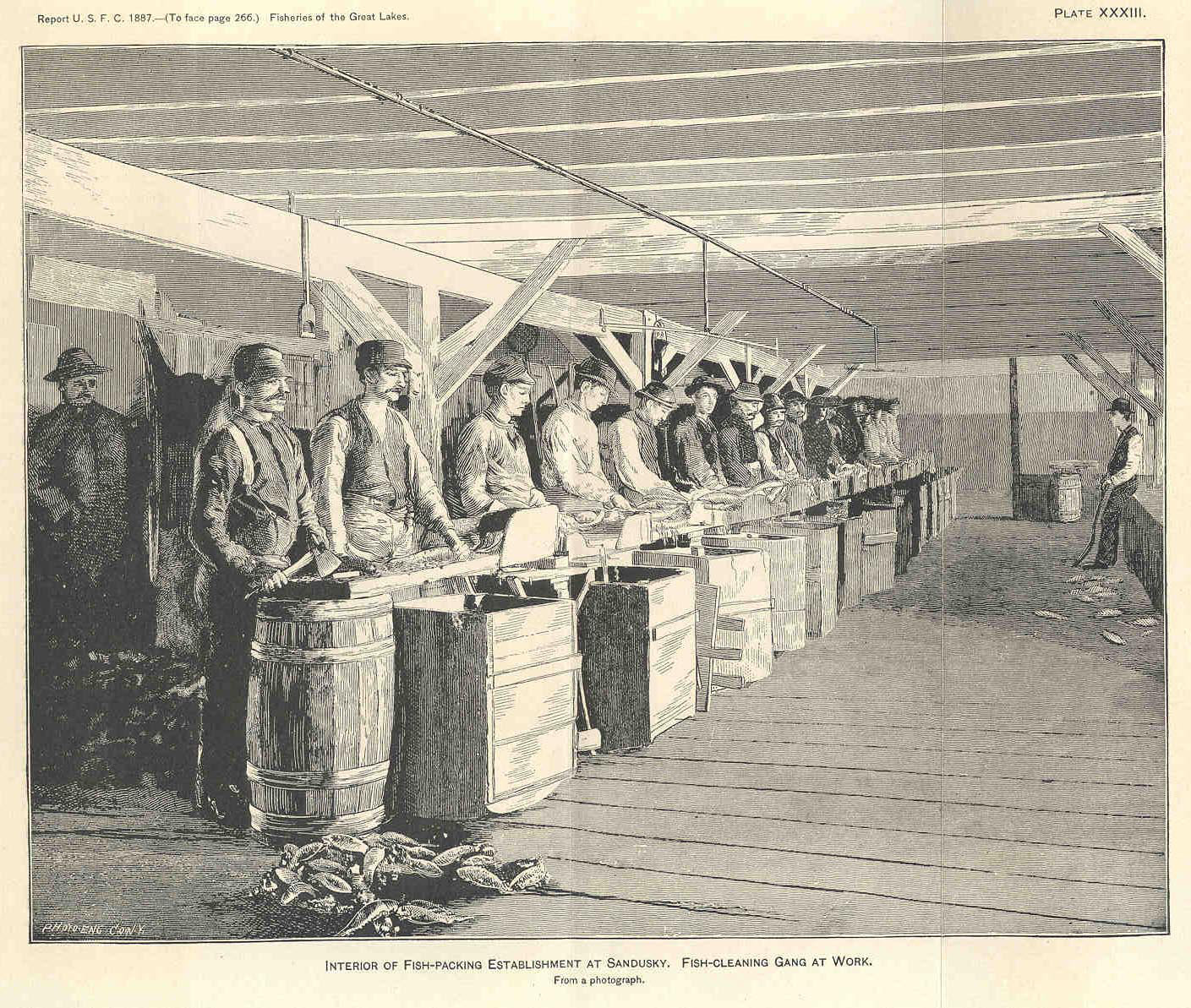
The interior of the Fish-Packing Establishment in Sandusky in 1887

=== Top employers ===
According to Sandusky's 2024 Annual Comprehensive Financial Report, the top employers in the city are:

#	Employer	# of Employees
1	Six Flags Entertainment Corporation	6,590
2	Firelands Regional Health System	2,032
3	Ventra Sandusky LLC	796
4	Erie County	739
5	Sandusky Board of Education	735
6	Providence Care Center	382
7	City of Sandusky	341
8	US Tsubaki Power Transmission	199
9	State of Ohio	175
10	Okamoto Sandusky	165

Note: Six Flags Entertainment Corporation is listed under its subsidiary Magnum Management Corporation.

== Tourism ==
Sandusky has a tourism industry led by the Cedar Point amusement park, as well as various water parks and neighboring islands. It is also noted for being the location of the fictional "Callahan Auto Parts" in the 1995 comedy film Tommy Boy.

=== Cedar Point ===
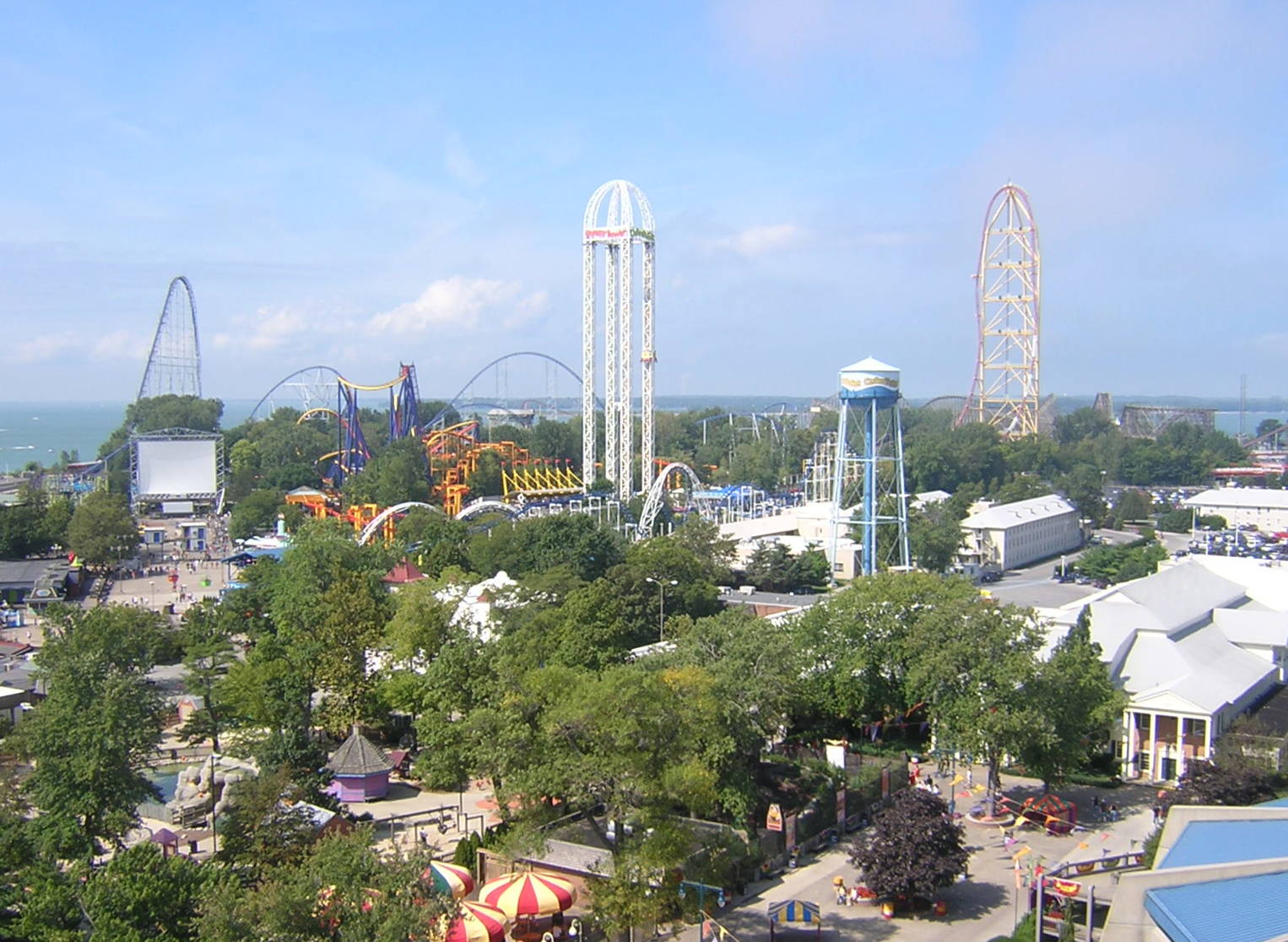
Cedar Point, the second-oldest operating amusement park in the U.S.

Cedar Point is a 364-acre (147 ha) amusement park located on a peninsula on Lake Erie. America's second-oldest theme park and popularly known as "America's Roller Coast", the park is tied with Canada's Wonderland as having the third-largest collection of roller coasters in the world at 18, behind only Energylandia and Six Flags Magic Mountain.

Cedar Point is also the only park in the world to have six roller coasters with heights of over 200 feet (61 m). Numerous Cedar Point roller coasters have set world records, the most notable of these being Magnum XL-200, Millennium Force, and Top Thrill Dragster each having set the record for the tallest full-circuit roller coaster at their respective openings. GateKeeper opened in 2013 with the highest inversion (from ground level) of any roller coaster. As of 2024, the ride has the fifth-highest inversion. Steel Vengeance opened in 2018 as the tallest, fastest, and longest hybrid roller coaster, and the first "hyper-hybrid" roller coaster. As of 2024, the ride remains the longest hybrid roller coaster, but is tied for the second fastest and is the third tallest, surpassed by Zadra and Iron Gwazi.

=== Waterparks ===
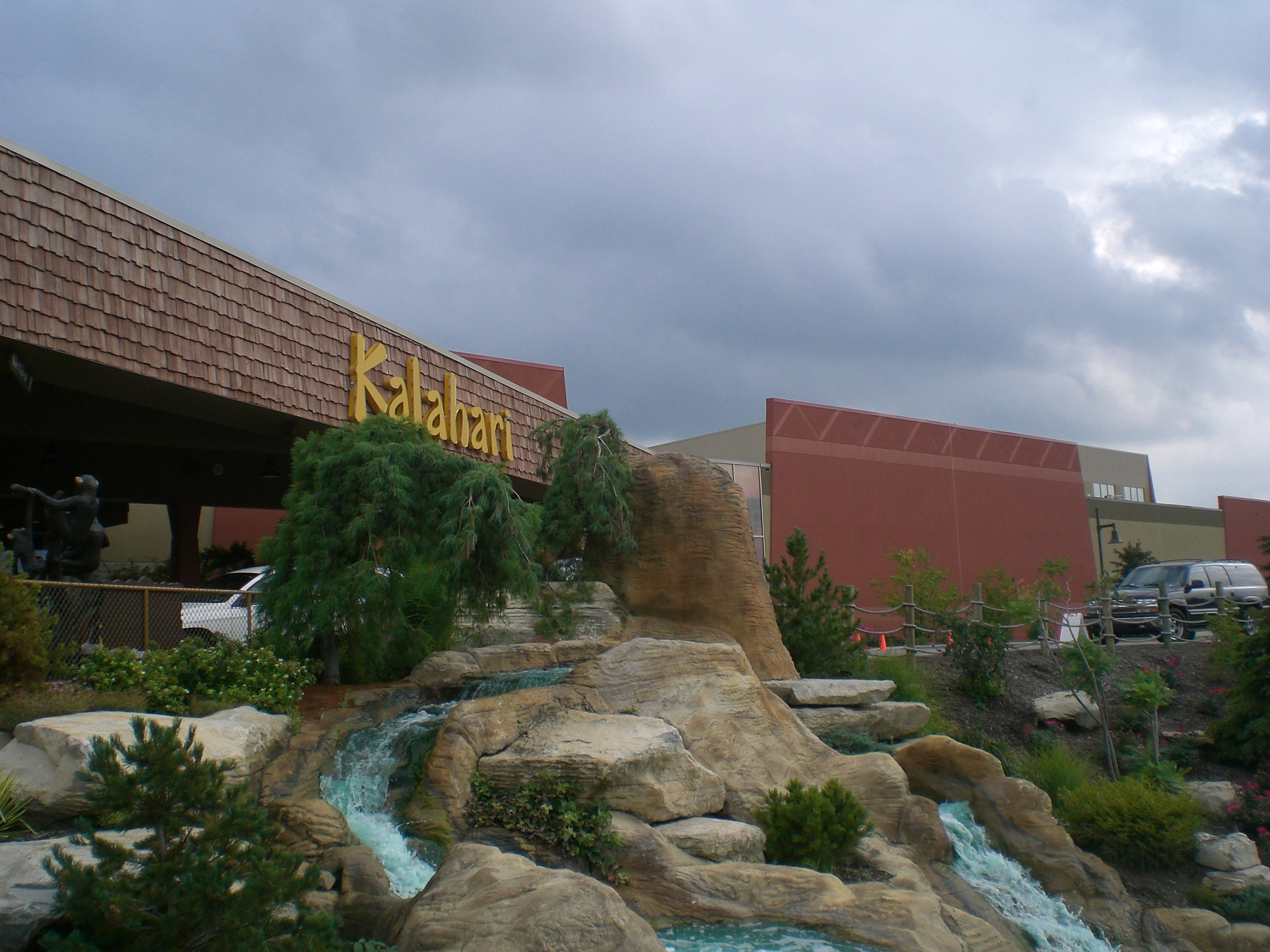
Kalahari Resorts, an African-themed indoor waterpark that opened in 2005

Six Flags Entertainment Corporation operates two water parks in Sandusky: Cedar Point Shores, an outdoor park adjacent to Cedar Point that opened in 1988, and Castaway Bay, an indoor park and resort opened in 2004.

Another indoor water park, Great Wolf Lodge, opened in Sandusky in 2001 and features restaurants, arcades, spas, and other children's activities. Kalahari Resorts opened an African safari-themed indoor water park in 2005 that was the largest of its kind at one time. Its hotel is the largest in the state of Ohio. The resort also features an 215,000-square-foot (20,000 m^{2}) convention center.

=== Islands ===
May through August every year, Sandusky residents and incoming tourists flock to the neighboring islands north of the city, with many transportation options leaving right from downtown. The islands include Kelleys Island, South Bass Island (host of the popular village known as Put-in-Bay), Middle Bass Island and North Bass Island.

Themed parties are a common occurrence in the summer season throughout Sandusky and on the neighboring islands, such as "Island Fest", "Rock on the Dock", and "Christmas in July"; thousands of residents and tourists join in the festivities annually.

In 2008, the residents of Sandusky hosted their first annual "Barge Party", where boats from as far as Toledo and Cleveland came to dock up their boats together at the sandbar, just inside Sandusky Bay. The barge party ensues twice every year, typically in late June and late July.

== Museums ==
Sandusky is home to several museums and historic homes. These include the Cooke-Dorn House historic site which was the home of Eleutheros Cooke, the Follett House Museum which was the home of Oran Follett, the Maritime Museum of Sandusky, the Merry-Go Round Museum, and the Ohio Veterans Home Museum.

== Government ==
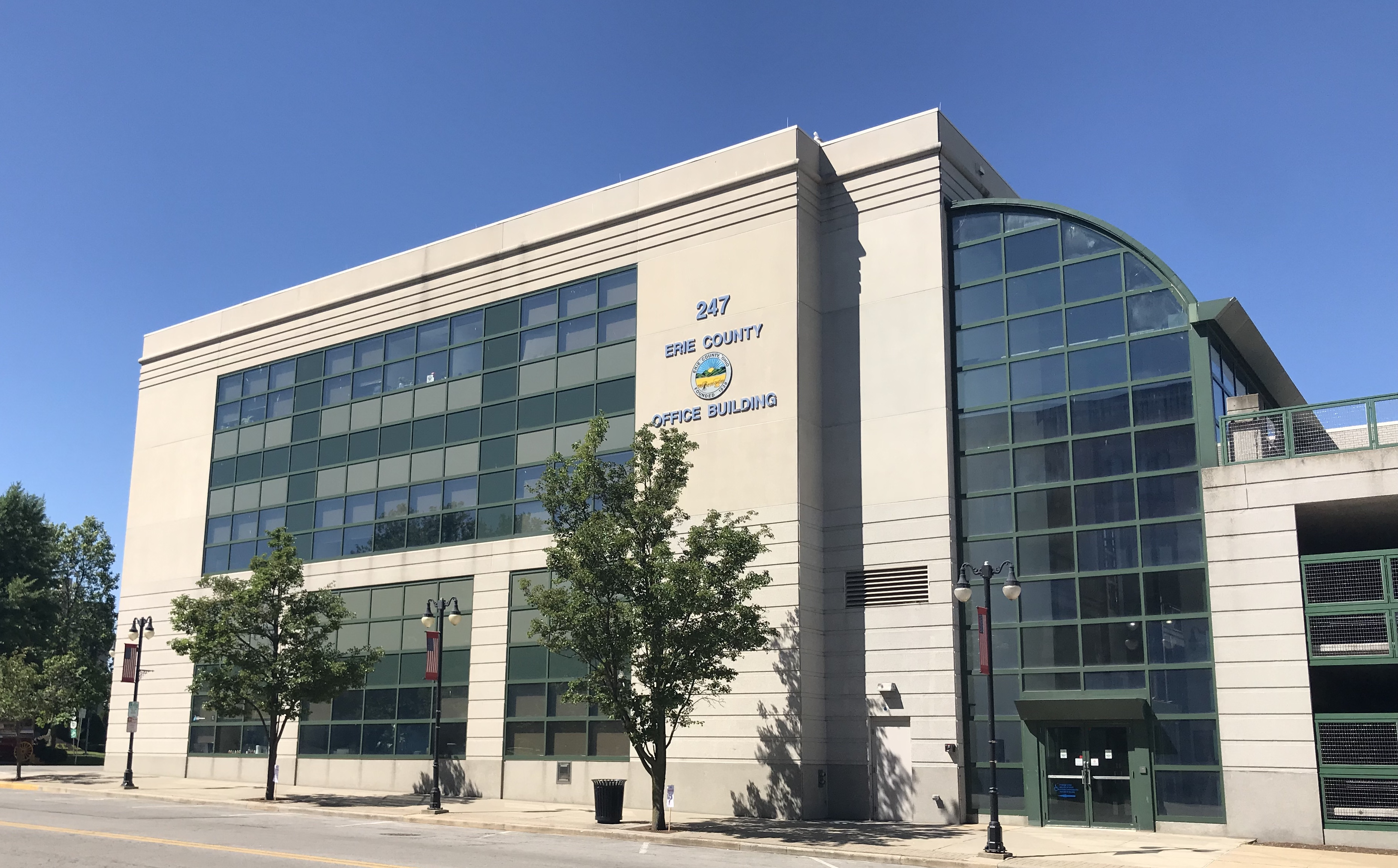
Erie County Office Building

Sandusky operates under a council–manager government; there are seven city commissioners elected as a legislature and a mayor who serves as the council's president. All are elected for four-year terms. The council employs a city manager for administration. John Orzech is the current city manager and Katharine L. Vargo is the president of the city commission.

=== Federal representation ===
Sandusky is represented by Marcy Kaptur (D-Toledo) in the house. In the Senate, the city is represented by Bernie Moreno (R-Ohio) and Jon Husted (R-Ohio).

== Education ==
Sandusky Public Schools enroll 3,775 students in public primary and secondary schools. Sandusky City Schools operates six public schools. Sandusky Early Learning Academy, constructed on the grounds of the former Hancock Elementary School, serves Pre-K and Kindergarten students. Sandusky Primary School, constructed on the grounds of the former Ontario Elementary School, serves 1st and 2nd grade students. Sandusky Intermediate School serves grades 3rd through 6th. Sandusky Middle School, serves grades 7th and 8th, which moved to Sandusky High School after the closing of Adams Junior High (formerly served 7th grade) and Jackson Junior High (formerly served 8th grade). Sandusky High School serves 9th through 12th grade students. Sandusky Digital Academy is an alternative school for students who struggle in mainstream classrooms. Sandusky Career Center offers vocational programs for adults, now located at the former Venice Elementary School.

Alternatively, St. Mary Central Catholic High School, a private Roman Catholic school associated with Holy Angels Church, St. Mary's Church, and Sts. Peter & Paul Church, focuses on giving students a faith-centered learning environment. Monroe Prep Academy is a private charter school in downtown Sandusky. Monroe Prep is located in the former Monroe Elementary, which served students in Kindergarten through 6th grade as a part of the Sandusky City Schools District. It is located on E. Monroe St. on Sandusky's East Side.

Sandusky is served by the Sandusky Library, which also operates a branch on Kelleys Island.

== Media ==
=== Print ===
Sandusky (along with nearby Port Clinton and the Lake Erie Islands - known in the region collectively as "Vacationland") is served by a daily newspaper, the Sandusky Register.

=== TV ===
The Vacationland region–which encompasses Sandusky–has one locally targeted television station, religiously oriented WGGN-TV channel 52. Sandusky's location between Toledo and Cleveland means that the city is also served by stations (albeit at a fringe level) in both of those markets as well.

=== Radio ===
There are 14 local radio stations serving the Sandusky/Vacationland market. Music stations include WCPZ 102.7 FM (hot AC), WMJK 100.9 FM (country), WOHF 92.1 FM (classic hits), WFRO-FM 99.1 FM (AC), and WLEC 1450 AM/93.5 FM (oldies/sports/full service), all owned by BAS Broadcasting, based in nearby Fremont. WKFM 96.1 FM (country), WLKR-FM 95.3 (Adult album alternative) and WLKR 1510 AM/92.9 FM (classic hits) are all owned by Elyria-Lorain Broadcasting Co., another nearby locally based company. Also in the market are WNZN 89.1 FM (urban gospel) and WGGN 97.7 FM (Contemporary Christian - sister station of the aforementioned WGGN-TV).

Ideastream Public Media operates Kent State University-owned WNRK 90.7 FM which serves as the region's NPR affiliate as a repeater of WKSU in Kent.

Religious stations include WVMS 89.5 FM (run by the Moody Bible Institute as a repeater of WCRF-FM in Cleveland), WHRQ 88.1 FM (carrying Toledo-based Annunciation Radio, an EWTN Radio affiliate), and WHVT 90.5 FM.

== Transportation ==
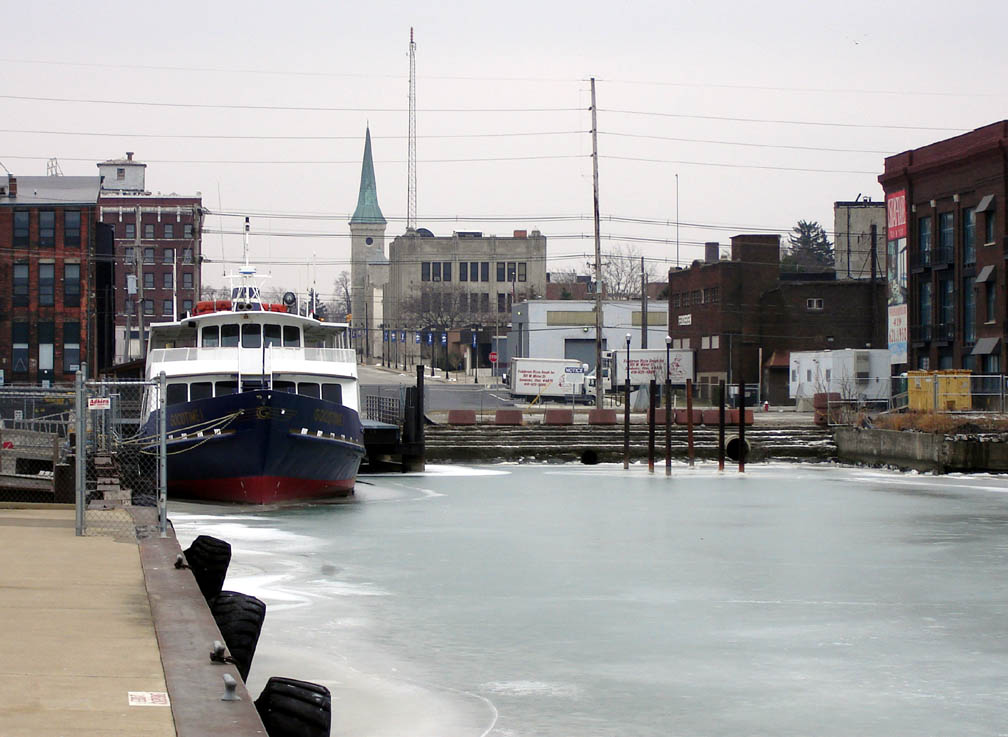
U.S. Customs and Border Protection entry site in downtown Sandusky

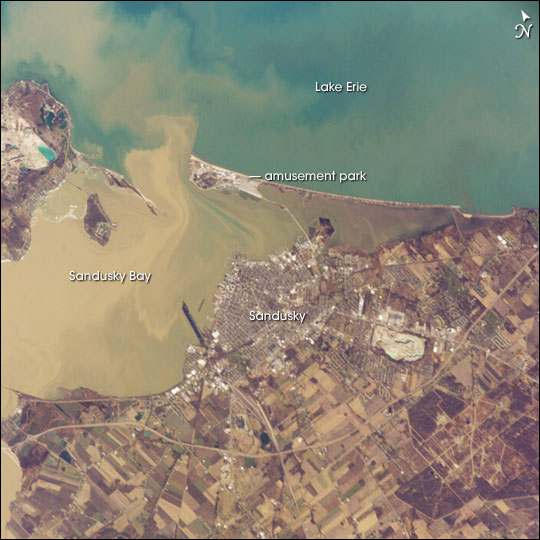
Muddy brown water fills Sandusky Bay, just south of Lake Erie in this astronaut photograph.

Sandusky Transit System (STS) runs a full-service transit system across the Greater Sandusky Area. Their headquarters are located at 1230 North Depot Street.

Line	Areas Served	Service frequency	
Blue	Suburban areas, Route 250, Sandusky Mall, Kalahari Resort	Daily; 6 a.m. - 10:30 p.m.	Half-hourly
Red	East side and Downtown district	Daily; 6 a.m. - 10:00 p.m.	Hourly
Yellow	Cedar Point Drive, Cedar Point Sports Center, Sawmill Creek Resort, Bowling Green State University (Falcon Point Lofts)	Peak season: 6:30 a.m. - 10:30 p.m.; Daily service; Off-season: 6:30 a.m. - 8:30 p.m., except Sundays	Hourly
Purple	South side, Amtrak station, Sandusky Mall	Monday through Saturday - 6:00 a.m. - 8:00 p.m.	Hourly
Green	West side	Monday through Saturday - 6:00 a.m. - 8:00 p.m.	Hourly

The hub is located in Sandusky's downtown district on the corner of Washington & Wayne Streets, as an established terminus. STS also operates paratransit and demand-responsive services across Erie County's locale.

Amtrak, the national passenger rail system, provides service to Sandusky. There are four trains daily, all arriving in the late night/early morning hours: the Capitol Limited between Chicago and Washington, D.C., via Pittsburgh; and the Lake Shore Limited between Chicago and New York/Boston via Buffalo. The Sandusky Amtrak Station is also home to serving inter-city bus service provided by Greyhound Lines and GoBus. Into the 1930s, the Baltimore and Ohio Railroad operated a passenger train from Willard in north-central Ohio, as a section of a Wheeling, WV-Chicago train.

Several ferry boats serve the Sandusky area. All ferries depart from the Jackson Street Pier and onto the Lake Erie Islands.

- Lake Erie Cruises Goodtime I - Daytime island hopping cruises on select days to Kelleys Island, and Put-in-Bay. Also offers themed cruises and charters.
- Pelee Islander - Provides car and passenger ferry service to Pelee Island and onto to Leamington, Ontario and Kingsville, Ontario. Must have a valid passport to purchase tickets.
- The Jet Express - Provides high speed passenger ferry service to Kelleys Island, Put-in-Bay, and Cedar Point.

The city was previously served by Griffing Sandusky Airport until its closure in 2013. The community is currently served by Erie–Ottawa International Airport in nearby Port Clinton for general aviation and limited commercial service to the Lake Erie Islands by Griffing Flying Service.

In terms of road access, Sandusky is a short drive off the Ohio Turnpike (Interstate 90 and Interstate 80), enabling easy transportation to Sandusky from cities like Toledo, Cleveland, and Erie, Pennsylvania via those roads. U.S. Route 6 runs through Sandusky, and both Ohio State Route 4 and U.S. Route 250 converge on Sandusky.

== Notable people ==
- John Jay Barber (1840–1910), painter
- John Beatty (1828–1914), banker, U.S. Representative (1868–1873); brigadier general during Civil War
- Bill Berry (born 1958), drummer for band R.E.M.; lived in Sandusky 1968–1972
- Andrew Biemiller (1906–1982), U.S. Representative from Wisconsin
- Brian Bixler (born 1982), Major League Baseball player
- Brandy Burre (born 1974), actress, played Theresa D'Agostino on HBO series The Wire
- Roger Carter (born 1961), professional darts player
- Chris Castle (born 1976), folk/Americana singer-songwriter
- Dandridge MacFarlan Cole (1921–1965), aerospace engineer, futurist, author
- Henry D. Cooke (1825–81), financier, journalist, railroad executive, politician
- Jay Cooke (1821–1905), Civil War financier, railroad magnate, philanthropist
- Jay Crawford (born 1965), sportscaster
- Corey Croom (born 1971), football player
- Thom Darden (born 1950), defensive back for Cleveland Browns, 1972–1981
- Robert L. Denig (1884–1979), major general, Marine Corps; Sandusky's highest-ranking sea service officer
- John Emerson, born Clifton Paden (1874–1956), actor, playwright, director of silent films
- Chad Fairchild (born 1970), Major League Baseball umpire
- George Feick (1849–1932), builder of Wyoming State Capitol, buildings in and near Sandusky
- Charles Frohman (1856–1915), producer, co-founder of Theatrical Syndicate
- Daniel Frohman (1851–1940), theatrical producer, film producer
- Andy Gerold (born 1978), guitarist with Marilyn Manson
- Jon Gruden (born 1963), NFL head coach and TV analyst
- Edwin Bret Hart (1874–1953), biochemist
- Fred Kelsey (1884–1961), actor, director
- Dick Kinzel (born 1940), CEO of Cedar Fair Entertainment Company
- Aaron Kromer (born 1967), NFL assistant coach
- Jeff Linkenbach (born 1987), NFL offensive tackle
- William d'Alton Mann (1839–1920), Civil War soldier, businessman, publisher
- Scott May (born 1954), basketball player, NCAA national champion, 1976 Player of the Year, 1976 Olympic gold medalist; NBA player
- Jacquelyn Mayer (born 1942), named Miss America 1963; section of Route 2 in Erie County is named "Jackie Mayer Miss America Highway"
- Betty Mitchell (1896–1976), theatre director and educator
- Thomas J. Moyer (1939–2010), chief justice of Ohio Supreme Court from 1987 to 2010
- Dennis Murray (born 1962), Democratic member of Ohio House of Representatives
- George Nichols (1907–1986), light heavyweight boxing champion
- Jim Obergefell (born 1966), LGBT rights activist and United States Supreme Court plaintiff in Obergefell v. Hodges
- Catherine Opie (born 1961), artist, professor of photography at UCLA
- Orlando Pace (born 1975), offensive lineman in Pro Football Hall of Fame; played for Sandusky High School, which retired his jersey number
- Charles Wilson Pierce, former U.S. Congressman for the 4th District of Alabama and State Senator in Nebraska
- Kevin Randleman (1971–2016), former UFC Heavyweight Champion, two-time Division I NCAA wrestling champion for Ohio State University, mixed martial arts fighter
- Blanche Roosevelt (1853–98), opera singer and author
- Edmund G. Ross (1826–1906), Senator whose vote prevented impeachment of President Andrew Johnson
- William F. Schaub (1900–1999), U.S. Assistant Secretary of Army 1961–1962
- Elmer Smith (1892–1984), Major League Baseball outfielder 1914–1925; helped Cleveland Indians win the 1920 World Series
- Brad Snyder (born 1982), Major League Baseball player
- Todd Stephens, film director, writer and producer
- Orville James Victor (1827–1910), theologian, journalist, abolitionist
- Dave Waddington (born 1952), powerlifter and strongman; first to break 1,000-pound barrier in squat
- Alvin F. Weichel (1891–1956), Republican in U.S. House of Representatives (1943–1955)
