= The Lounge (radio network) =

The Lounge was a 24-hour music network in the USA produced by Dial Global and distributed under their Dial Global Local brand (formerly by Waitt Radio Networks). The network's tag line was Great Songs and Stars. The format was discontinued on June 17, 2012, as part of a corporate reorganization by Dial Global which resulted in the elimination of the Dial Global Local brand and the absorption of most of the other DG Local formats into the main Dial Global portfolio.

Its playlist was composed of adult standards and gold-based adult contemporary music from artists such as Frank Sinatra, Dean Martin, The Carpenters, Barbra Streisand, Tony Bennett, etc. that mainly targets listeners ages 25–54. Although their format was considered adult standards, it was more of a middle of the road format with soft oldies added to the playlist and modern-day artists such as Kimberley Locke, Jamie Cullum, Norah Jones, Michael Bublé, and others who did cover versions of the standards.

== Competitor networks ==
- Music of Your Life by Planet Halo, Inc.
- Timeless by ABC Radio Networks (now defunct)
