= Vacationland (Ohio) =

Tourist destination

Coordinates: 41°29′N 82°46′W

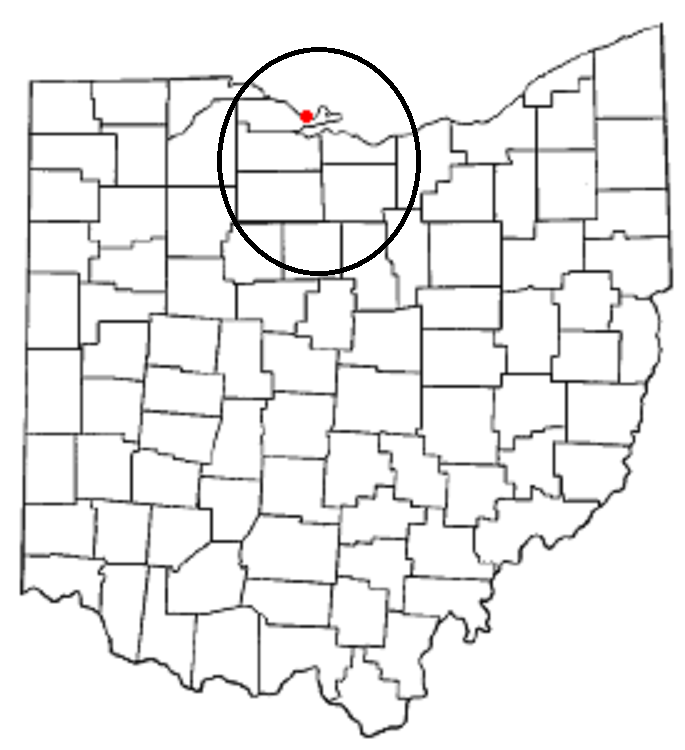
The part of Ohio colloquially known as "Vacationland" is shown in the circle.

The Vacationland region of Ohio—billed as such for being known primarily as a major summertime tourist destination—is the area that is generally considered to be in the north central part of the state, and along the western half of the Lake Erie shoreline around Sandusky Bay, specifically the counties of Erie, Huron, Ottawa, and Sandusky.

== History ==
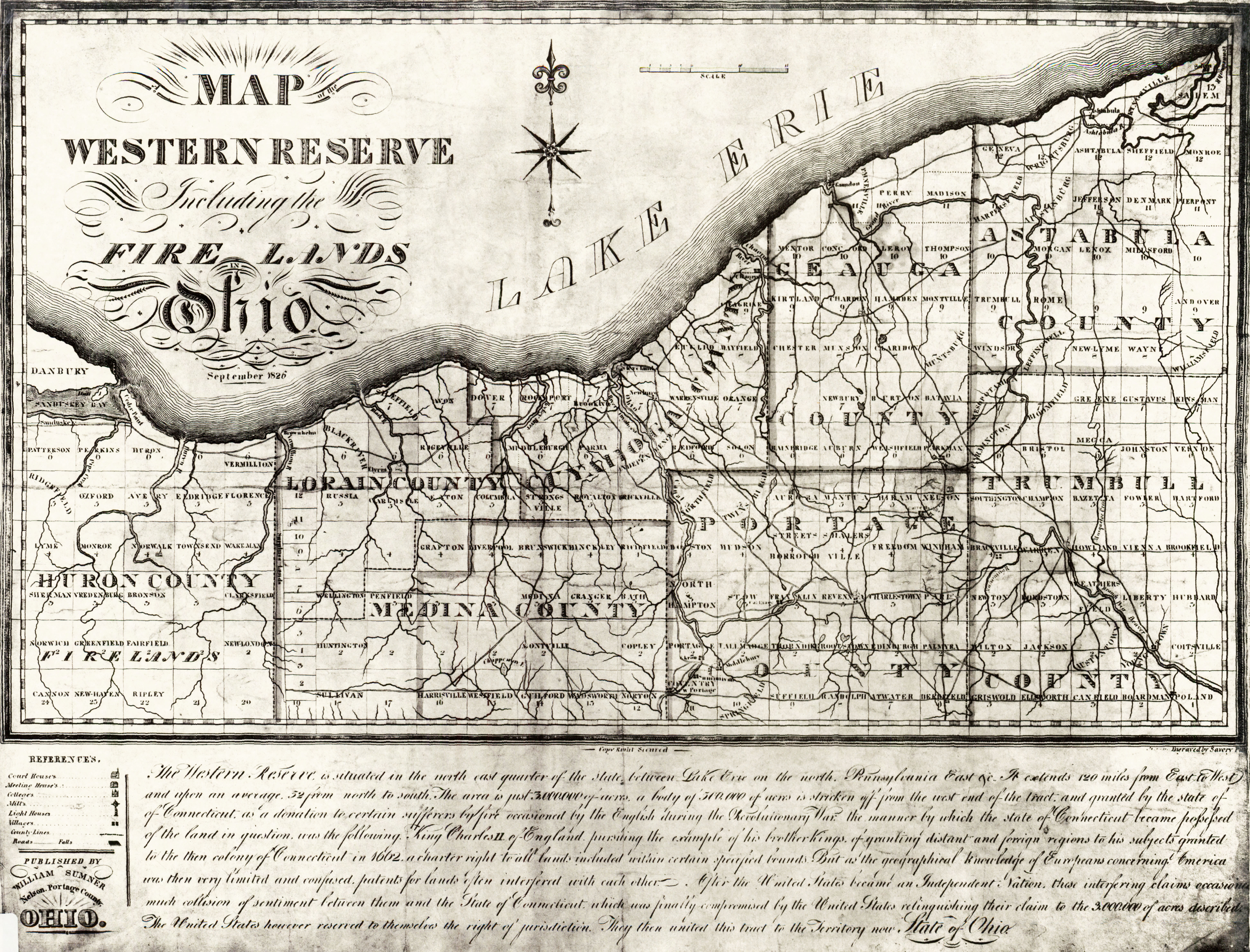
The Firelands region of northern Ohio circa 1826. Many cities in the westernmost part of the area consider themselves to be in what is known in modern times as the "Vacationland" region of Ohio.

In the early part of the 20th century, cities along the Lake Erie shoreline, such as Sandusky, Ohio, began to become popular vacation destinations for more affluent Ohioans. Families bought either summer cottages or vacation homes in the area, and people with access to boats sailed or fished in Lake Erie from this area. During the 20th century, the area became more popular also with more blue-collar families, who began to see the region as an inexpensive and nearby place to spend their leisure time. The Sandusky River is designated as a "state scenic river", and some tourists travel it in canoes to see the best scenery, including covered bridges.

== Attractions ==
The Cedar Point amusement park in Sandusky attracts millions of people to the area every year. The Lake Erie Islands are also considered an important part of this region, as they have become noted for their dining, nightlife, and overall tourist appeal through the latter half of the 1900s and into the 2000s. Other cities such as Marblehead and Port Clinton are popular with visitors for their numerous historical attractions, wineries, and various other points of interest.

== Recognition ==
The area has been officially recognized as "Vacationland" since 1962 by the Miss Ohio beauty pageant, which allows it to elect a "Miss Vacationland" to compete in higher level contests. Jacquelyn Mayer, who won the title of the first "Miss Vacationland" in 1962, would go on to win Miss Ohio and ultimately Miss America that year.

== See also ==
- Firelands
