= Port Clinton, Ohio =

- City
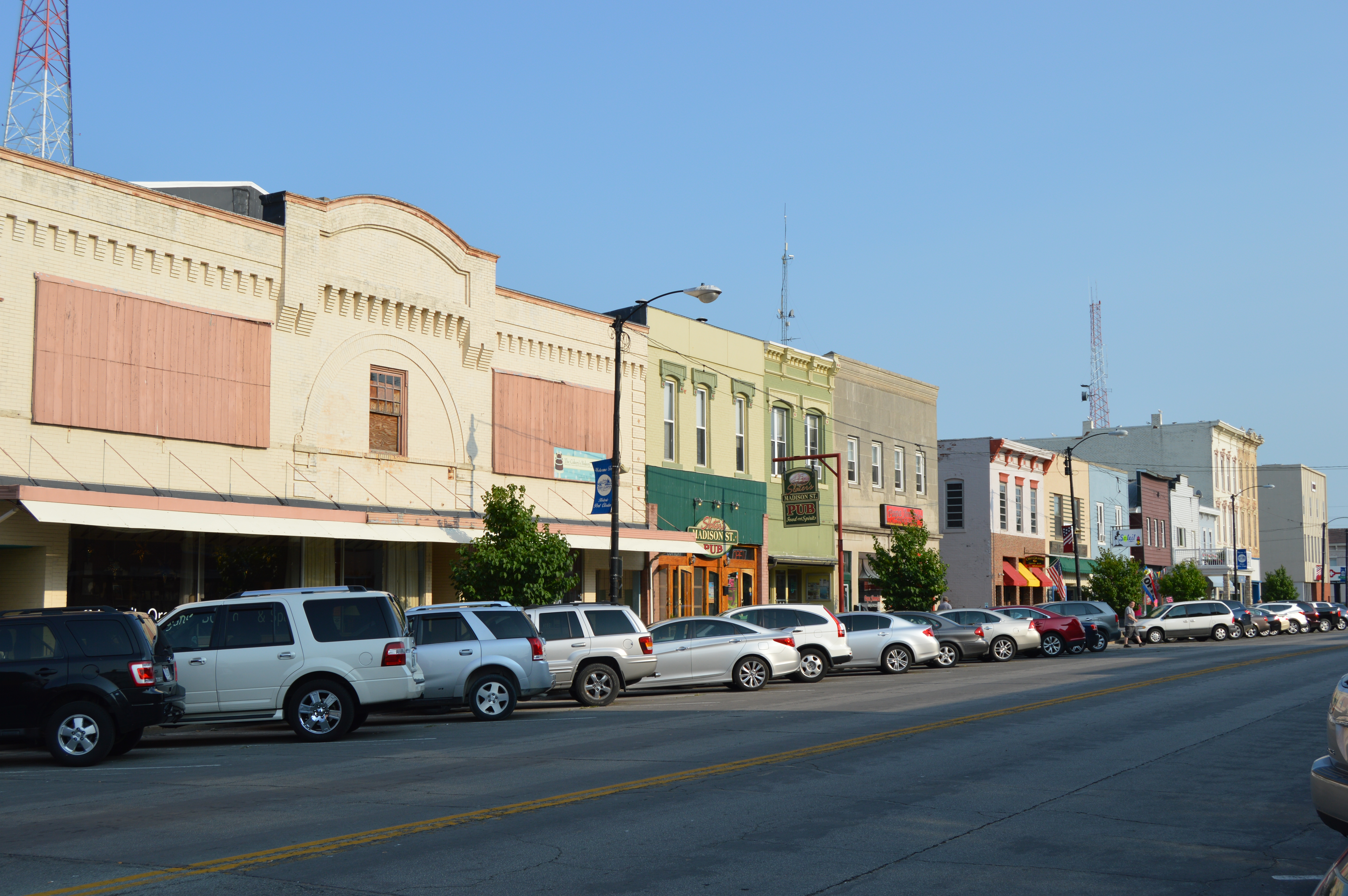
- Downtown Port Clinton

- Flag Seal
- Interactive map of Port Clinton, Ohio
- Location within Ohio Location within the United States
- Coordinates: 41°30′25″N 82°56′15″W
- Country: United States
- State: Ohio
- County: Ottawa

Government
  - Mayor: Michael Snider

Area
  - Total: 2.36 sq mi (6.12 km^{2})
  - Land: 2.13 sq mi (5.52 km^{2})
  - Water: 0.23 sq mi (0.60 km^{2})
- Elevation: 577 ft (176 m)

Population (2020)
  - Total: 6,025
  - Density: 2,828.0/sq mi (1,091.88/km^{2})
- Time zone: UTC-5 (Eastern (EST))
  - Summer (DST): UTC-4 (EDT)
- ZIP codes: 43452
- Area code: 419
- FIPS code: 39-64150
- GNIS feature ID: 2396253
- Website: www.portclinton.com

Port Clinton is a city in and the county seat of Ottawa County, Ohio, United States, located at the mouth of the Portage River on Lake Erie. The population was 6,025 at the 2020 census. It is the principal city of the Port Clinton micropolitan area, about 34 miles (55 km) southeast of Toledo.

The city has been nicknamed the "Walleye Capital of the World", due to the productive fishing waters for the species lying offshore in Lake Erie's Western Basin. The annual Walleye Drop on New Year's Eve in downtown Port Clinton reflects this nickname.

== History ==
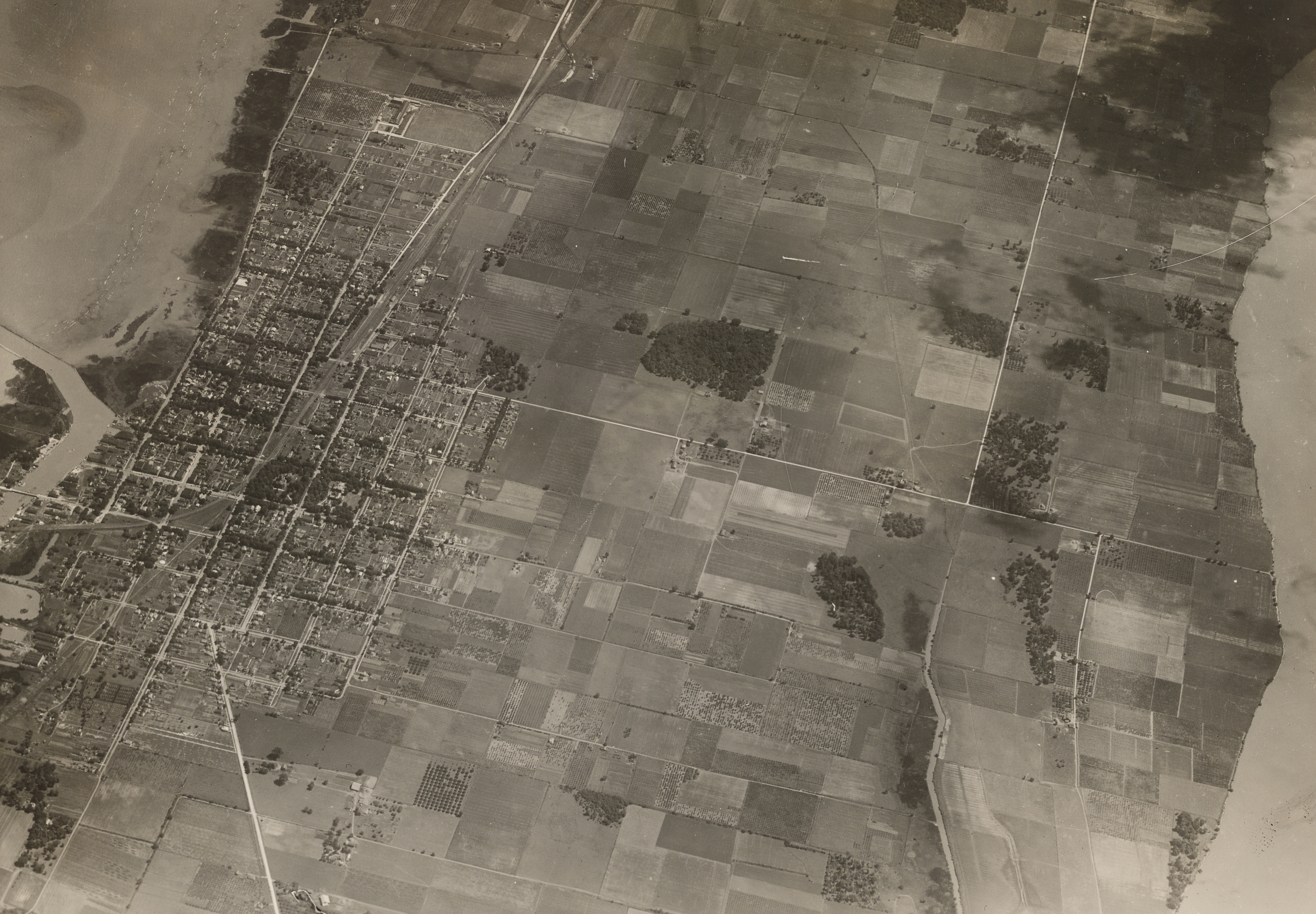
Port Clinton in the 1930s

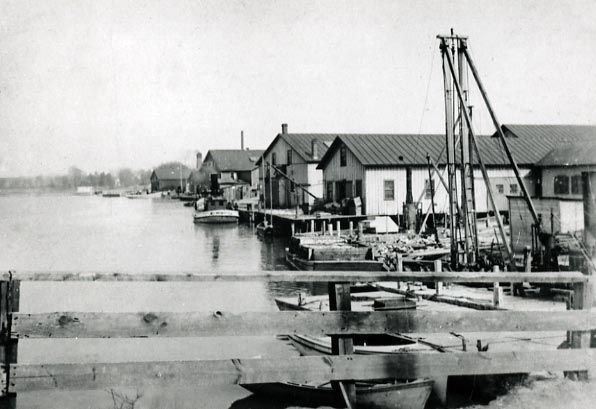
Fish houses on the Portage River,c. 1920

Established in 1828, the town was named after New York governor DeWitt Clinton, who was instrumental in creating the Erie Canal, which connected the Midwest along the Great Lakes to the markets of the Hudson River and New York.

The city saw small population growth throughout 19th century, with a population of 1,600 in 1880 and 2,049 residents in 1890. By 1886, Port Clinton contained three newspaper offices, four churches, and one bank. Several manufacturing businesses existed in the town, with the largest being A. Couche & Company, a sawmill that employed ten workers. Most businesses provided services or products to farmers in the surrounding countryside.

During the 20th century, Port Clinton's population grew, especially in the second half of the century with the expansion of the Vacationland region as a whole with increasing tourism. In 2000, 6,391 residents lived in the community.

== Geography ==
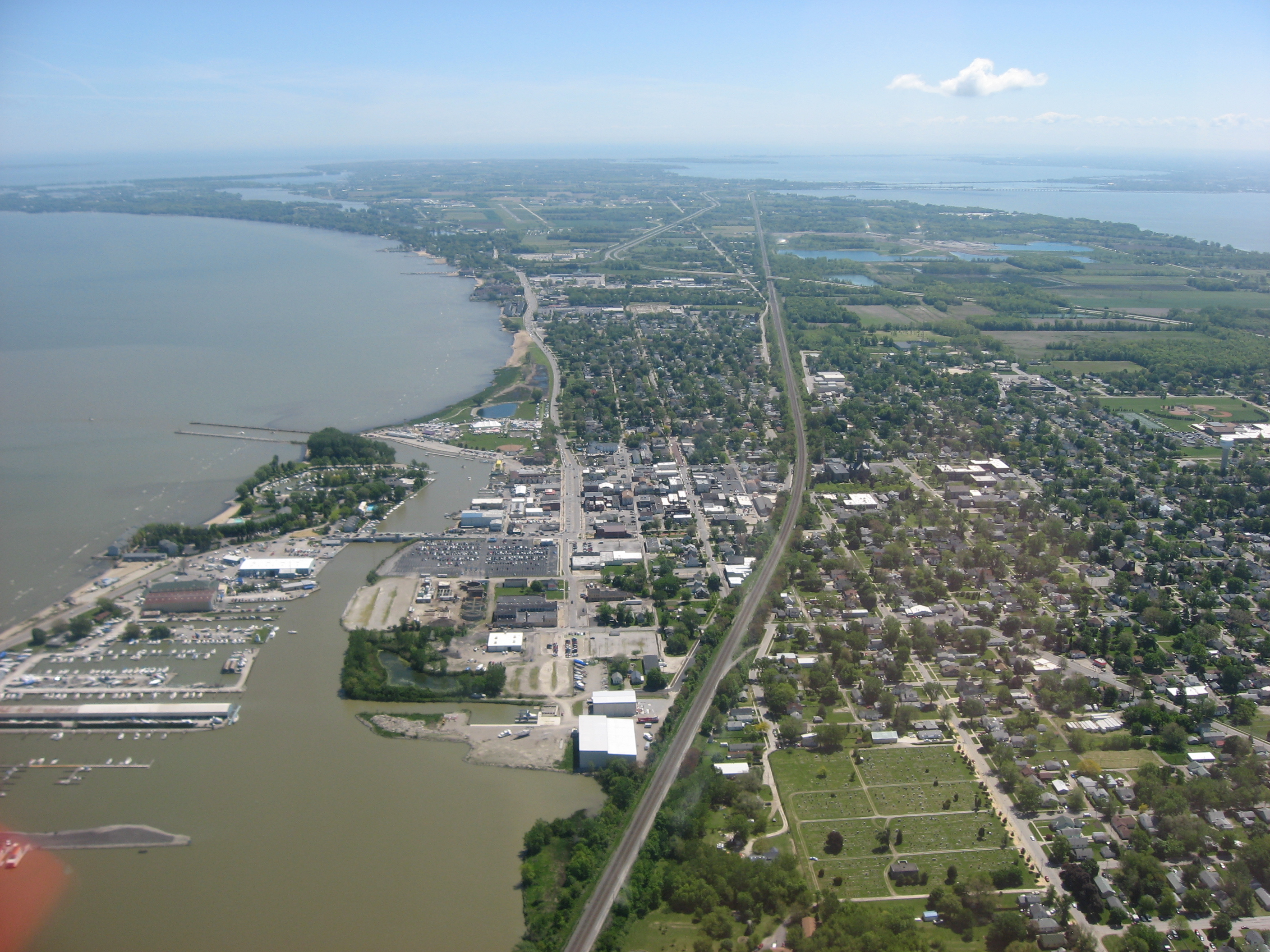
Downtown Port Clinton from the air

According to the United States Census Bureau, the city has a total area of 2.28 square miles (5.91 km^{2}), of which 2.08 square miles (5.39 km^{2}) is land and 0.20 square miles (0.52 km^{2}) is water.

== Demographics ==
Historical population
Census	Pop.	Note	%±
1850	249		—
1870	543		—
1880	1,600		194.7%
1890	2,049		28.1%
1900	2,450		19.6%
1910	3,007		22.7%
1920	3,928		30.6%
1930	4,408		12.2%
1940	4,505		2.2%
1950	5,541		23.0%
1960	6,870		24.0%
1970	7,202		4.8%
1980	7,229		0.4%
1990	7,106		−1.7%
2000	6,391		−10.1%
2010	6,056		−5.2%
2020	6,025		−0.5%
2025 (est.)	5,875		−2.5%

=== 2020 census ===
As of the 2020 census, Port Clinton had a population of 6,025. The median age was 41.7 years. 22.2% of residents were under the age of 18 and 20.9% of residents were 65 years of age or older. For every 100 females there were 88.9 males, and for every 100 females age 18 and over there were 87.6 males age 18 and over.

100.0% of residents lived in urban areas, while 0.0% lived in rural areas.

There were 2,755 households in Port Clinton, of which 26.7% had children under the age of 18 living in them. Of all households, 34.2% were married-couple households, 21.3% were households with a male householder and no spouse or partner present, and 35.8% were households with a female householder and no spouse or partner present. About 39.3% of all households were made up of individuals and 16.1% had someone living alone who was 65 years of age or older.

There were 3,670 housing units, of which 24.9% were vacant. The homeowner vacancy rate was 2.1% and the rental vacancy rate was 8.9%.

Racial composition as of the 2020 census
Race	Number	Percent
White	5,181	86.0%
Black or African American	186	3.1%
American Indian and Alaska Native	15	0.2%
Asian	37	0.6%
Native Hawaiian and Other Pacific Islander	2	0.0%
Some other race	110	1.8%
Two or more races	494	8.2%
Hispanic or Latino (of any race)	544	9.0%

=== 2010 census ===
As of the census of 2010, there were 6,056 people, 2,633 households, and 1,614 families residing in the city. The population density was 2,911.5 inhabitants per square mile (1,124.1/km^{2}). There were 3,464 housing units at an average density of 1,665.4 per square mile (643.0/km^{2}). The racial makeup of the city was 93.3% White, 2.3% African American, 0.1% Native American, 0.2% Asian, 1.8% from other races, and 2.1% from two or more races. Hispanic or Latino of any race were 7.8% of the population.

There were 2,633 households, of which 27.9% had children under the age of 18 living with them, 42.2% were married couples living together, 13.9% had a female householder with no husband present, 5.2% had a male householder with no wife present, and 38.7% were non-families. 33.6% of all households were made up of individuals, and 12.8% had someone living alone who was 65 years of age or older. The average household size was 2.24 and the average family size was 2.81.

The median age in the city was 41.5 years. 22.1% of residents were under the age of 18; 7.8% were between the ages of 18 and 24; 24% were from 25 to 44; 28.5% were from 45 to 64; and 17.6% were 65 years of age or older. The gender makeup of the city was 47.8% male and 52.2% female.

=== 2000 census ===
As of the 2000 census the median income for a household in the city was $35,564, and the median income for a family was $44,579. Males had a median income of $38,949 versus $21,651 for females. The per capita income for the city was $19,177. About 7.7% of families and 9.7% of the population were below the poverty line, including 11.2% of those under age 18 and 6.2% of those age 65 or over.

== Economy ==
Port Clinton's economy benefits from its lakefront situation, with its fishing, boating, and recreational tourism industries providing employment opportunities to many locals. Port Clinton and surrounding attractions in Ottawa and Erie County are collectively known to visitors as "Vacationland", or more recently, Lake Erie's "Shores and Islands". The regional tourist economy is anchored by attractions like Cedar Point, Put-in-Bay, and Kelleys Island. Several hotels are located within the city, which provide lodging for visitors to these and other attractions. Port Clinton is the primary mainland port of the Jet Express, a high speed passenger ferry service to Put-in-Bay. The National Rifle Matches, held at nearby Camp Perry, and the springtime bird migration at Ottawa National Wildlife Refuge, are two prominent events held annually that contribute to Port Clinton's tourist economy.

== Education ==
Port Clinton is served by the Port Clinton City School District. It operates two elementary schools (Bataan Memorial Elementary), one middle school (Port Clinton Middle), and one high school (Port Clinton High). In 2012, Port Clinton City School District opened a new middle school and an expansion to Bataan Memorial.

Port Clinton is served by Ida Rupp Public Library, which also operates satellite locations in Marblehead and Put-in-Bay.

== Media ==
Port Clinton is part of the Sandusky/Lake Erie Islands (Vacationland region) radio market and is included as part of the Toledo TV market.

Port Clinton is home to WPCR - PortClintonRadio.com, "Ottawa County's News, Sports, and Weather Authority." This internet exclusive radio station carries live local sporting events, weather, and fishing reports as well as locally produced programs.

Port Clinton is served in print by the Port Clinton News Herald, the city's only daily newspaper. It is also covered by the Sandusky Register, which is the region's largest newspaper.

== Infrastructure ==
=== Transportation ===
The Erie–Ottawa International Airport is located three nautical miles (3.5 mi; 5.6 km) east of Port Clinton's central business district.

== Notable people ==
- Robert Putnam, political scientist, author, and Malkin Professor of Public Policy at the Harvard University
- Chris Redfern, politician, former chairman of the Ohio Democratic Party
- Henry Semon, Oregon state legislator
- Louis C. Shepard, American Civil War Medal of Honor recipient from Ashtabula County
