= Dial Global Local =

American radio network and syndication service

- Type: Radio network
- Country: United States
- Availability: United States/Canada; National, through regional affiliates
- Owner: Triton Media Group
- Former names: Waitt Radio Networks (-2010)

Dial Global Local (formerly Waitt Radio Networks) was a national radio network based in Omaha, Nebraska. As a subsidiary of Dial Global, the network specialized in 24-hour formats for affiliated radio stations across the United States and Canada which were localized for their client stations, although they also were known for commercial production services. Dial Global Local also provided affiliates with coverage of breaking news events.

== History ==
Former Waitt Radio Networks logo prior to its name change to Dial Global Local.

The network was owned by NRG Media until 2008. On April 30, 2008, it was announced that NRG Media had sold the assets of Waitt Radio Networks to Triton Radio Networks, which also operated Dial Global Digital 24/7 formats (once part of Westwood One). Dial Global subsequently merged Waitt's existing 24-hour formats and commercial production services into its own operations. The merger was completed in 2010.

In June 2012, due to reorganizations at Dial Global, the Dial Global Local 24/7 formats were fully integrated into Dial Global's portfolio of formats, and "Dial Global Local" ceased to exist as a brand name. However, most of the former Dial Global Local formats were still offered to affiliate stations as before. Three formats: Rock 2.0, Good Time Oldies, and Hits Now!, were only available in local versions.

Westwood One shut down Rock 2.0, Hits Now! and Good Time Oldies on April 20, 2025.
