= Hutson Mason =

American football player (born 1991)

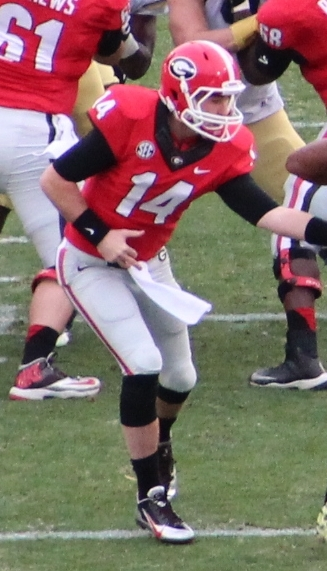
- Mason with the Georgia Bulldogs in 2013

No. 14
- Position: Quarterback

Personal information
- Born: September 20, 1991 (age 35); Marietta, Georgia, U.S.
- Listed height: 6 ft 3 in (1.91 m)
- Listed weight: 209 lb (95 kg)

Career information
- High school: Lassiter (Marietta, Georgia)
- College: Georgia
- NFL draft: 2015: undrafted

Career history
- Washington Redskins (2015)*; Saskatchewan Roughriders (2015)*
- * Offseason or practice squad member only
- Stats at Pro Football Reference

Hutson Taylor Mason (born September 20, 1991) is an American former football quarterback. He played college football at Georgia and was the Bulldogs starting quarterback in 2014. He was signed as an undrafted free agent by the Washington Redskins in 2015.

Mason currently works as a broadcaster for ESPN and a sports radio host for WCNN in Atlanta, Georgia. He is also a contributor to The Federalist, writing about sports and politics.

== Early life ==
Mason attended Lassiter High School in Marietta, Georgia. As a senior, he threw for a Georgia high school record 4,560 yards and 54 touchdowns and was the state's Gatorade Football Player of the Year. In his two years as starter he threw for 8,265 yards and 85 touchdowns.

== College career ==
As a true freshman at the University of Georgia in 2010, Mason played in four games as a backup quarterback to Aaron Murray. He passed for 102 yards and had one touchdown. As a sophomore in 2011, he again was the backup to Murray, passing for 254 yards and two touchdowns. In 2012, he redshirted so that he could have another year of eligibility. Mason returned in 2013 as the backup to Murray. After Murray tore his ACL, Mason took over as Georgia's starting quarterback and made his first career start against Georgia Tech. He finished the game 22 of 36 for 299 yards and two touchdowns. Mason also started the 2014 Gator Bowl, passing for 320 yards with one touchdown. Overall, he appeared in five games, going 67 of 110 for 968 yards, five touchdowns and three interceptions. In 2014, he took over as Georgia's starting quarterback after Murray graduated. He started all 13 games, completing 188 of 277 for 2,167 yards, 21 touchdowns, and four interceptions.

== Professional career ==
=== Washington Redskins ===
Mason signed with the Washington Redskins on May 18, 2015. He was released on June 9, 2015.

=== Saskatchewan Roughriders ===
Mason was signed to the practice roster of the Saskatchewan Roughriders on September 9, 2015. He was released by the Roughriders on October 20, 2015.

Mason participated in The Spring League in 2017.

== Post-playing career ==
Since 2017, Mason has provided color commentary for college football games on ESPN networks.

In 2018, Mason began a career in sports radio, co-hosting Tug and Hut with Tug Cowart on WFOM in Atlanta. In September 2020, Mason began co-hosting Buck and Hut on WFOM's parent station WCNN, pairing him with fellow former Georgia Bulldogs quarterback Buck Belue. Mason replaced longtime WCNN host John Kincade, who was laid off due to budget cuts in the wake of the COVID-19 pandemic. Mason also hosts a weekly college football preview show called Game Day With Hutson Mason on the SportsMap Radio Network, which airs nationally on Saturday mornings during college football season.

In July 2021, he became one of five hosts of The Locker Room on WCNN alongside Brian Finneran, Joe Hamilton, John Michaels and Brandon Leak.

In 2020, Mason began working as a contributor to the conservative political commentary blog The Federalist.

In August 2022, Mason won the Long Drive Competition at the John Smoltz Golf Classic.
