= Tom Hughes (radio host) =

American radio personality

Tom Hughes is an American radio personality. Until November 21, 2006, he was the host of a morning radio news program on 640 WGST-AM in Atlanta, Georgia.

Hughes had been broadcasting in the Atlanta area for decades, and was affectionately referred to as "The King" among his co-workers at Clear Channel Atlanta. This is a nickname that was initiated by afternoon show host Kim Peterson, who was let go on the same day.

== AM Atlanta with Tom Hughes ==
AM Atlanta with Tom Hughes was the morning show on Atlanta's WGST. Tom spent nearly thirty years with the station, before resigning in November 2006.

Unlike other weekday shows on WGST, AM Atlanta was a news program rather than a talk program. Hughes didn't normally express many personal opinions on the show. Rather, he interviewed newsmakers, and talked about the day's news in a generally unbiased manner. Hughes did crack jokes about the day's events, though, especially entertainment stories. Hughes was let go in 1997 when WGST changed to Planet Radio. Hughes went to 680 WCNN until 2000 when he returned to WGST.

Tom's producer was Matt McClure, and his technical operator was Matt Fields.

== Announcement on leaving WGST ==
On November 21, 2006, Hughes announced that this would be his last day. The reason that he was leaving was not disclosed either by Hughes or by the radio station management. However, it appears to be linked to a national restructuring by Clear Channel as midday host Denny Schaffer, and afternoon host Kim Peterson were also let go.

Hughes closed his final broadcast with words from the chorus of a World War II song, "Until we meet once again, you and I, wish me luck, as you wave me goodbye."
