= Kim Peterson =

American television and radio journalist

Kim Peterson (known as "The Kimmer") is an American television and radio journalist. Beginning June 5, 2023, he hosts the 3:00PM to 6:00PM EST news/information talk-show on WFOM - Xtra 106.3 FM /1230 AM with his producer Brad “Flounder” Dundon and associate Pete Davis. Previously he hosted a news/information talk-show on Atlanta's WYAY NewsRadio 106.7. The Show consisted of Peterson as host, Pete Davis as co-host/sports anchor/producer, Chad "The Hangman" Potier as associate producer/call screener and show engineer Jon Michael "Jon-Boy" Drain. From 1992 through 2006, he hosted a radio talk show on WGST-AM in Atlanta, Georgia. Formerly a United States Marine from 1966 to 1969, he served in Vietnam during the Vietnam War and was discharged as a sergeant. Before becoming a radio host, Peterson was a television anchor in Chicago and New Orleans. He was on rival news-talk station WSB before he came to WGST. After his firing from WSB Peterson would refer to his former employer as "WSOB" and "WBS" (and sometimes "We Suck and Blither").

Peterson was a donor for the Marine's Toys for Tots Christmas drive, and from 1997 to 2005 he produced a comedy bits CD, donating all the proceeds to the drive. In addition he hosted an annual charity golf tournament. Peterson is an avid motorcycle enthusiast.

From December 2005 to May 5, 2006, members of Peterson's support team started to lose their positions at WGST. Jim Gossett, a voice impersonator who specialized in past presidents Ronald Reagan, George H. W. Bush, George W. Bush, and classic celebrities such as Johnny Carson, among others, quit his job in December 2005. Two months later, WGST-AM's sports director, Pete Davis, was fired for reasons not publicly disclosed. A final firing among Peterson's team was on May 5, when his producer, Wayne Kitchens, was terminated. Kitchens told an online media outlet (Buzz) that management was upset when he didn't bleep out an anti-Muslim statement Peterson said on the air the week prior to his firing. Kitchens has speculated that the firings were an attempt to force Peterson to quit.

Peterson's final broadcast for WGST was on November 20, 2006. The station announced the next day that he was no longer on the air.

== The Kimmer Show ==
The Kimmer Show is a 3:00PM to 6:00PM EST news/information talk-show on WFOM - Xtra 106.3 FM /1230 AM with his producer Brent “Flounder” Dundon and associate Pete Davis.

The Kimmer Show previously was an afternoon radio talk show on Atlanta's WYAY Talk 106.7 radio station hosted by Peterson, and featuring Pete "Snake" Davis, Chad "Hangman" Potier, and John-Boy. The show was formerly broadcast on the WGST AM radio station (640 kHz) in Atlanta.

WGST and Kim Peterson produced a "best-of" highlights audio CD of his show every year from 1996 to 2005. It was called "The Kimmer Komedy Klassics." One year the CD included an additional DVD of the Kimmer roast event. The final CD was released in December 2005; it included a bonus disc with all 10 years of "Kimmer Komedy Klassics" in mp3 format. All CD sales profits were donated to the U.S. Marine Corps "Toys for Tots" program as part of the WGST yearly Christmas fund drive.

In addition to scheduled segments, Peterson had regular listeners who frequently called in to his show. The group ranged from an outspoken liberal caller he referred to as "Commie Dave," who was eventually given 60 seconds per week to rant, to Helper John and the police and truck drivers who called in just to say "hello." Peterson's regular staff included producer Wayne ("No Offense!") Kitchens, who later worked for Eagle 106.7 FM, the late Keith Kalland (1951–2002), Art "Madman" Merrhing with traffic reports, and Pete "Snake" Davis at 5:15 with a daily sport segment (which Peterson referred to as the "Holy Crap It's Sports" segment).

One popular feature of Peterson's program was known as "Flush The Lines." He would tell listeners to call en masse and would put everyone who called on the air for just a few seconds to make a (usually comedic) remark.

As of about noon November 21, 2006, Kimmer's page on the WGST.com website was taken down, and at 3 p.m. it was announced that The Dave Ramsey Show (originating from flagship 99.7 FM WWTN Nashville) would air live from 3 to 6 p.m. in the Atlanta market. Peterson, along with the remaining vestiges of local talent on WGST, Denny Schaffer and Tom Hughes, were fired on November 21 as part of the nationwide restructuring of ClearChannel's radio properties.

On March 13, 2007, it was posted on an Atlanta radio blog that Peterson had refused an unnamed offer and would retire from radio. The blog's writer, Rodney Ho, confirmed this with Peterson. It was later revealed that the station was Dickey Broadcasting's WCNN/680 The Fan.

In April 2010 Peterson partnered with Josh Price of the website Conservative Beacon to do a series of podcasts. It was anticipated that in addition to remembering his WGST radio show, Peterson would offer his opinion on current events. The podcasts ended in June of that year.

On October 22, 2013, it was reported that Kim Peterson was returning to Atlanta radio and would appear from noon to 3 p.m. weekdays on WYAY All News 106.7 FM starting Nov. 4, 2013. Joining him would be Jim "Newsmaker Line" Gossett and Pete "Snake" Davis. Wayne "No Offense" Kitchens was unable to return due to other obligations.

On April 16, 2018, Cumulus Radio, owner of WYAY, announced that Kimmer's show would be moved to the afternoon drive (3-6pm.), replacing Brian Joyce in that slot.

On February 13, 2019, Cumulus announced plans to sell several of its stations, including WYAY, to Educational Media Foundation, which operates the syndicated Christian pop format "K-Love." WYAY officially became a K-LOVE affiliate on May 31, 2019 immediately following Kimmer's final show.

On December 13, 2019, Kimmer Show started a podcast on Patreon.

On January 21, 2020, it was announced that the Kimmer Show would be back on the radio on WTZA 1010AM and 102.1 FM starting February 3, 2020, from 4 p.m. to 7 p.m.

Effective June 5, 2023, Kimmer was back on air from 3:00PM to 6:00PM EST on WFOM - Xtra 106.3 FM /1230 AM and online at xtra1063.com.
