= WAKL =

WAKL may refer to:

- WAKL (FM), a radio station (106.7 FM) licensed to Gainesville, Georgia, United States
- WLFN (FM), a radio station (88.9 FM) licensed to Flint, Michigan, United States, which held the call sign WAKL from 2001 to 2019
