= WKVR =

WKVR may refer to:

- WKVR (FM), a radio station (102.5 FM) licensed to serve Baltimore, Ohio, United States
- WLFN (FM), a radio station (88.9 FM) licensed to serve Flint, Michigan, United States, which held the call sign WKVR from 2022 to 2024
- WKVR-FM (Pennsylvania), a defunct radio station (92.3 FM) formerly licensed to serve Huntingdon, Pennsylvania, United States
