= WBIN (AM) =

Black Information Network radio station in Atlanta, Georgia, United States

- Atlanta, Georgia; United States
- Broadcast area: Atlanta metropolitan area
- Frequency: 640 kHz
- Branding: Atlanta's BIN 640

Programming
- Language: English
- Format: All-news radio
- Network: Black Information Network

Ownership
- Owner: iHeartMedia; (iHM Licenses, LLC)
- Sister stations: WBZW; WBZY; WRDG; WUBL; WWPW

History
- First air date: April 7, 1988
- Former call signs: WPBD (1988–1989); WGST (1989–2020)
- Call sign meaning: Black Information Network

Technical information
- Licensing authority: FCC
- Facility ID: 29730
- Class: B
- Power: 50,000 watts (day); 1,000 watts (night)
- Transmitter coordinates: 33.762916°N 84.458508°W

Links
- Public license information: Public file; LMS
- Webcast: Listen live (via iHeartRadio)
- Website: atlanta.binnews.com

WBIN (640 kHz) is a commercial AM radio station licensed to Atlanta, Georgia. It is owned by iHeartMedia, through its subsidiary iHM Licenses, LLC. It serves the Atlanta metropolitan area as its affiliate for the Black Information Network. The station's studios and offices located at the Peachtree Palisades Building in the Brookwood Hills district. The transmitter site is off Joseph E. Boone Boulevard Northwest in the Center Hill neighborhood of Atlanta.

== History ==
The station signed on April 7, 1988, as WPBD, programming R&B oldies and soul. The original owner was the Phoenix City Broadcasting company, headed by Michael Hollins, under a Federal Communications Commission program promoting minority ownership. However, after it signed on, Hollins immediately began making arrangements to sell the station. A proposed purchase by Jefferson-Pilot Communications, owners of WQXI and WQXI-FM, fell through. However, in October 1988, it was announced that Jacor Communications, Inc. would buy the station.

At this time, Jacor was operating a station on 920 AM with the call letters WGST (now WGKA). However, WPBD had a better signal than WGST. It operated at 50,000 watts during the daytime and 1,000 watts at night, a substantial increase in daytime power and signal coverage area compared to WGST's 920 AM facilities. Effective June 30, 1989, WPBD's call sign was changed to WGST. The talk radio programming previously on 920 AM was transferred to 640 AM. Among WGST's staff of talk hosts was Neal Boortz.

In 1992, Boortz asked WGST management for a raise but he was turned down. Talk radio rival WSB hired Boortz, WGST then hired Sean Hannity to replace Boortz, after a few other hosts were tried out in his time slot. Hannity was brought in from a Huntsville, Alabama, radio station where he previously worked. He stayed at WGST until Roger Ailes offered Hannity a position on the soon-to-debut Fox News Channel in 1996. During his time at WGST, he was given the nickname "Hanni-Pie, The Tin Man" by fellow host Kim Peterson.

WGST was also the home for Atlanta Braves baseball broadcasts, from 1992-1994. WGST was the station that carried Sid Bream's winning slide in Game Seven of the 1992 NLCS. In May 1994, the station was outbid for Braves broadcast rights by WSB, which previously had carried the games from 1966 until 1991. WGST was also the home of the Atlanta Hawks basketball team until 1995, after which the Hawks followed the Braves to WSB. WGST carried NASCAR races in 1996 and 1997. It was the home of Atlanta Falcons football in 1998 when the team made its first Super Bowl appearance.

From 1993 until 2000, WGST programming was simulcast on WGST-FM (now WBZY). In 1999, Clear Channel Communications bought out Jacor, including WGST. Clear Channel was the forerunner to iHeartMedia, the present-day owner of the station.

2005 marked a year of change for WGST. The station won the rights to once again carry Atlanta Braves baseball. The station changed its moniker to "Braves Radio 640 GST." Many Braves fans who lived outside Atlanta and its close-in suburbs complained about the change from WSB, noting WGST's signal was much weaker at night than that of WSB's 50,000 watt clear channel broadcasts. To remedy the situation, WGST’s sister station WKLS (96.1 FM, now WWPW) began simulcasting Braves games. WKLS was powered at 100,000 watts, covering Atlanta and its growing suburbs.

Since the 1950s, WGST had been an ABC Radio Network affiliate. In 2005, as part of a Clear Channel corporate change, WGST switched to Fox News Radio as its national news provider. No longer affiliated with ABC, in March 2005, WGST dropped Paul Harvey's syndicated ABC news commentaries from its line-up.

On March 20, 2006, WGST's moniker became "Atlanta. Talk. Radio." On November 21, 2006, WGST announced that morning drive time host Tom Hughes had resigned, and that midday host Denny Schaffer, and afternoon drive talk host Kim Peterson (The Kimmer) and their staffs had been fired. On February 5, 2007, WGST announced that veteran Atlanta morning show hosts Randy Cook and Spiff Carner would be joining the station for a new live and local morning show.

On September 27, 2007, the syndicated Glenn Beck Program returned to WGST in the 9 a.m. to noon slot. Beck was previously heard on WGST from 2001 to 2005. Beck took over Mike McConnell's weekday spot, though McConnell was still heard on weekends.

On October 9, 2007, morning co-host Spiff Carner was fired by WGST, after 8 months on the air. Randy Cook remained on the newly named "The Morning Drive with Randy Cook." Spiff was later hired to co-host the "Spiff and Fred" show on WYAY. Clear Channel management did not renew Randy Cook's contract in July 2009. "The Morning Drive" was briefly hosted by comedian Mike Stiles from July 13 to 24, 2009, before being replaced by syndicated shows.

From July 27, 2009, to November 12, 2010, the weekday lineup consisted of all syndicated programming: The Wall Street Journal This Morning and Michael Smerconish in mornings; Glenn Beck in late mornings; The Rush Limbaugh Show in middays; Dave Ramsey in afternoons; Mark Levin in evenings and Coast to Coast AM with George Noory overnights. Atlanta Braves broadcasts would be dropped by WGST at the end of the 2009 baseball season.

On November 15, 2010, Atlanta radio personality Rob Johnson became the new morning host. On January 11, 2011, WGST said it would pick up The Savage Nation, a syndicated show from San Francisco hosted by Michael Savage. That was one day after it was cut by WSB in a schedule change. Beginning in early 2012, Atlanta local Dave Merlino joined Rob Johnson's morning show, re-billed as The Rob and Dave Show. The weekday lineup was The Rob & Dave Show at 6 a.m., Glenn Beck at 9 a.m., Rush Limbaugh at noon, a local version of The Rusty Humphries Show at 3 p.m., Mark Levin at 6 p.m., Michael Savage at 9 p.m., George Noory at midnight and The Wall Street Journal report at 5 a.m.

On September 26, 2012, several Atlanta news outlets reported that WGST would be changing formats. Johnson, Merlino, and Humphries were terminated, Limbaugh's show switched to WSB and Glenn Beck's show was picked up by WCFO. Coincidentally, Michael Savage suspended the broadcast of his show around the same time due to a contract dispute with his syndicator. On September 28, 2012, at 3 p.m., following Rush Limbaugh's program, WGST switched to a Spanish-language sports radio format, carrying the syndicated ESPN Deportes Radio Network.

On April 23, 2013, less than eight months after switching to Spanish-language sports, WGST announced it would return to an English-language talk format beginning June 3, 2013, featuring a lineup consisting entirely of syndicated programs, including Bloomberg's First Word with Ken Prewitt, America's First News with Gordon Deal, Glenn Beck, Michael Berry, and Coast to Coast AM among others. ESPN Deportes Radio moved to the FM translator 92.3 W222AF, replacing an all-comedy format.

In the early 2010s, WGST was simulcast on an HD Radio digital subchannel of sister station WUBL FM 94.9, along with FM translator station W222AF. WGST was also carried on the audio-only digital subchannel 32.21 of low-powered digital television station WANN-CD, as Clear Channel's other Atlanta holdings were. When WGST switched to Spanish-language sports, these three stations aired "Comedy 92-3." WUBL HD-3 and WANN-CA returned to running WGST after ESPN Deportes was dropped.

On August 30, 2019, WGST flipped to conservative talk as 640 Fox News Radio with a revised lineup. On June 29, 2020, the station began stunting with speeches by prominent African Americans. The next day, WGST flipped to all-news radio as Atlanta's BIN 640; it is one of the charter stations of iHeartMedia's Black Information Network — a multi-platform radio network serving the African-American community. On July 6, the station changed its call sign to WBIN to match the new branding.

== Former staff ==
- Sean Hannity, who hosted a local midday show in the early 1990s before joining Fox News Channel and having his WABC show picked up for syndication.
- Tom "The King" Hughes, former morning show host.
- Kim Peterson, former afternoon show host.
- Denny Schaffer, former midday host. Moved to WRNO-FM in New Orleans.
- Neal Boortz, talk host on WGST. Later syndicated nationally by Cox Radio and the Jones Radio Networks, while heard late mornings on WSB
- Michael King, weekend morning anchor 1997-1999. Later a producer and reporter at WXIA-TV 11 Atlanta.
- Brad Nessler, former sports reporter, later the play-by-announcer for CBS's SEC coverage.
- Clark Howard, consumer adviser, is retired and spent years syndicated nationally and on WSB.
- Matt McClure, former morning show producer, now with NY1 in New York City and CBS Radio traffic.
