= WCKY =

WCKY may refer to:

- WCKY (AM), a radio station (1530 AM) licensed to Cincinnati, Ohio, United States
- WCKY-FM, a radio station (103.7 FM) licensed to Pemberville, Ohio, United States
