= WLFN =

WLFN may refer to:

- WLFN (FM), a radio station (88.9 FM) licensed to serve Flint, Michigan, United States
- WJZM, a radio station (105.1 FM) licensed to serve Waverly, Tennessee, United States, which held the call sign WLFN from 2022 to 2024
- WLCX (AM), a radio station (1490 AM) licensed to serve La Crosse, Wisconsin, United States, which held the call sign WLFN from 1988 to 2020
