= Sean Baligian =

American sports radio personality

Sean Baligian is a sports radio broadcaster who has been on the Detroit sports airwaves, for WDFN and WJR. He is a native of Livonia, Michigan and graduated from Livonia Stevenson High School.

== Radio career ==
He began his radio career as a producer/reporter at WSPD in Toledo, Ohio in 1995. In 1997, he was named sports director and host of The Evening Sports Show. Baligian broadcast several sports for the station including OHL hockey, CCHA hockey, and was the analyst for both University of Toledo football and basketball.

In 1998 he began working part-time for WJR in Detroit, doing a Sunday call-in show. He worked on the Detroit Lions post-game show with former Lion Greg Landry.

He began working for WDFN in May 1999 and left WSPD in August 1999 to work for WDFN full-time. He hosted the 9:00 am–12:00 pm show It is What It Is (a reference to a quote given to reporters by former Detroit Lions running back James Stewart) as well as a weekly fantasy football show Fantasy Sports Geekly which ran from August through December. Baligian co-hosted Ice Time, a WDFN seasonal weekly hockey program, with fellow WDFN personality Greg Brady. Baligian would briefly work for both WDFN and WSPD again in 2004, and in May of that year he moved his Toledo afternoon sports talk show to WCWA when the station went all-sports. All three stations are owned by Clear Channel.

Baligian writes a fantasy football blog during the football season for Mlive.com. His fantasy football column has also appeared in The Detroit News.

Sean has also begun the underground movement of MEATA—Men Eating All the Tasty Animals—in response to all the media coverage offered to PETA for its every action due to its fashionable support by certain high-profile celebrities. In celebration of all things MEATA, Sean has begun an annual barbecue-style outing where all people are extended an open invite to enjoy, which has evolved into a charity food drive. This event is simply known as MEATA, and held at a different Detroit-area location each summer. The 2007 MEATA was held in the parking lot of the Compuware Sports Arena in Plymouth, Michigan.

On December 9, 2005, to protest the contract extension of Detroit Lions general manager Matt Millen, Baligian organized an "Millen Man March" at Ford Field, where several hundred fans carried signs and chanted "Fire Millen!" and other comments for about 45 minutes. "This was never about hating the Lions," Baligian was quoted as saying about the march. "It's about loving the Lions. We deserved better."

On October 17, 2007, Baligian was named Best Radio Sports Talk Host by the Detroit Metro Times for the people, places and things that make metro Detroit great.

Sean hosted the first edition of the renamed Detroit Lions postgame show on October 21, 2007 called "Cornbread Corner". The name was chosen by the fans on an on line poll after the Lions demanded that WDFN stop calling their postgame show The WDFN Detroit Lions Postgame Show. The reference to cornbread was a running joke at WDFN: "eating the cornbread" refers to the blind optimism many Detroit Lions fans show prior to the start of the season (similar to the expression "drinking the Kool-Aid"). Another Detroit sports radio station, WXYT, owns the broadcast rights to the Lions' broadcasts and the Lions asserted that WDFN was infringing on their trademark.

Sean also wrote a monthly column for In Play! Magazine magazine, beginning with the premiere issue in April 2007.

On January 20, 2009, it was announced by WDFN that Baligian, among other WDFN hosts were being let go, as the station would begin to air syndicated national sports content.

On Monday, August 17, 2009, Sean Baligian started an afternoon drive show with Ryan Terpstra, on the new ESPN 96.1, in Grand Rapids, MI

On Tuesday, September 8, 2009, Sean Baligian resumed hosting the morning show on WDFN from 7:00 am to 10:00 am, Monday through Friday.

On Monday, October 24, 2011, Sean Baligian announced that he was parting ways with WDFN and his show: Sean, Terp, and Killer, which was broadcast weekdays from 3-6pm.

On Monday, November 28, 2011, Sean Baligian returned to ESPN 96.1 in Grand Rapids Monday thru Friday from 3:00 PM to 6:00 PM, with a new show with a familiar name, "It Is What It Is". This new show is not simulcast on WDFN in Detroit like "Sean, Terp, and Killer" had been.

It was announced on October 23, 2015 that longtime sports-talk host in Metro Detroit and Grand Rapids, Sean Baligian, would take over the Noon to 3pm slot at WGMC and officially started on November 2, 2015. WGMC would later drop the sports talk format the following year as it performed poorly.

Sean has been the play-by-play radio voice of Wayne State University’s Warrior football for over a decade.

In late 2020, Sean joined Woodward Sports Network. Sean was joined by co-host Joique Bell, a former Detroit Lion. The Baligian and Bell show live streamed on Facebook and YouTube daily until late 2021.

In late 2021, WJR 760 am added Sean to the morning show with Paul W. Smith. Sean also co-hosts the Darren McCarty Show on Friday nights from 7- 8 p.m. on WJR, and Spin On Golf Sundays at 7 p.m.
