= WREK =

Radio station at the Georgia Institute of Technology

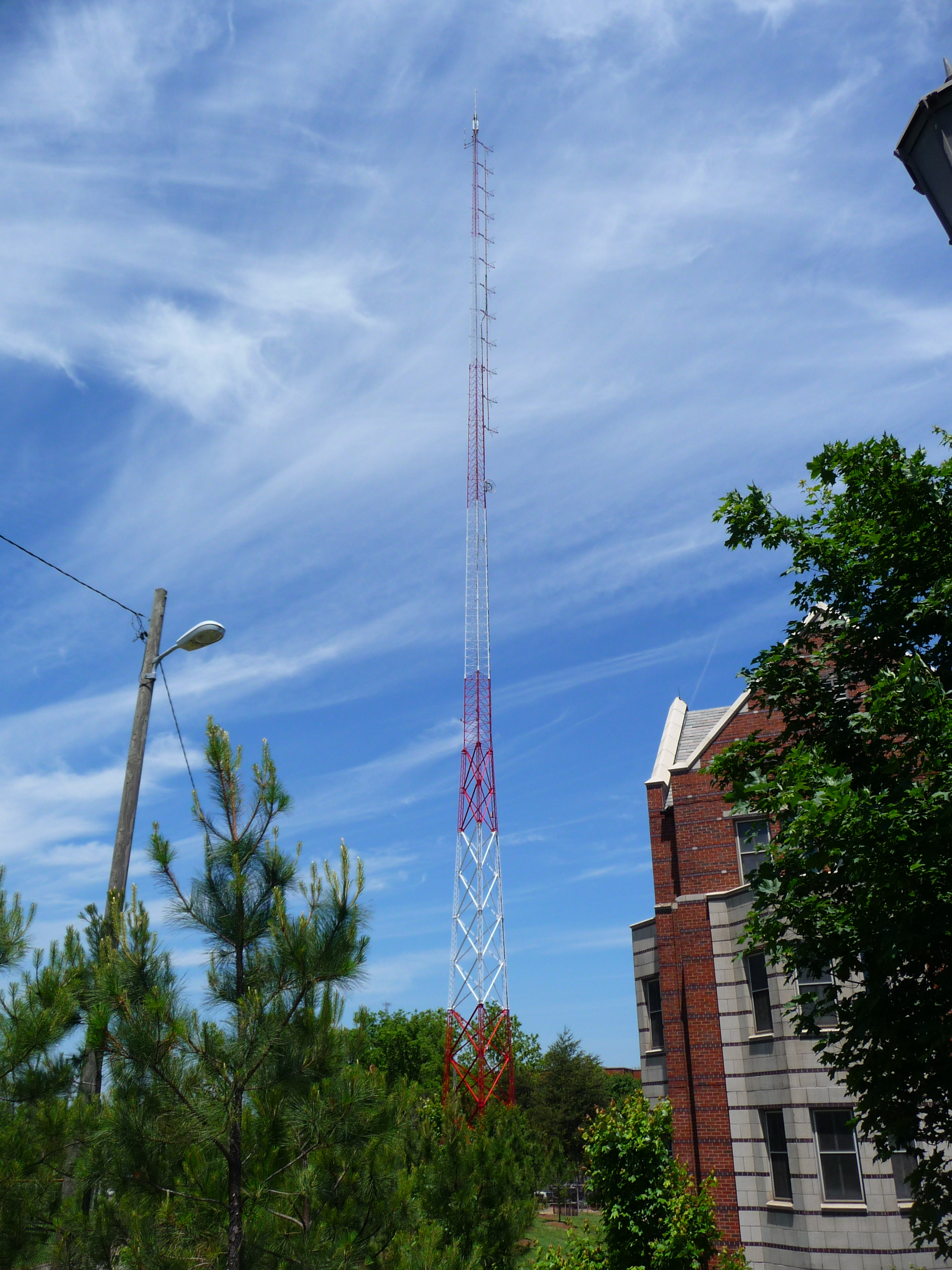
- WREK tower
- Atlanta, Georgia; United States
- Broadcast area: Atlanta metropolitan area
- Frequency: 91.1 MHz (HD Radio)
- Branding: WREK Atlanta

Programming
- Language: English
- Format: College radio

Ownership
- Owner: Georgia Tech Radio Communications Board

History
- First air date: March 25, 1968
- Call sign meaning: Ramblin' Wreck

Technical information
- Licensing authority: FCC
- Facility ID: 54536
- Class: C1
- ERP: 100,000 watts
- HAAT: 102 metres (335 feet)
- Transmitter coordinates: 33.77806°N 84.40611°W

Links
- Public license information: Public file; LMS
- Webcast: Listen live
- Website: www.wrek.org

WREK (91.1 FM "Wreck", from the Ramblin' Wreck) is a radio station staffed by the students of the Georgia Institute of Technology. It is also located on channel 17 on the Georgia Tech cable TV network, GTCN. Initially a 10-watt class D offering, WREK currently broadcasts a notably strong 100,000-watt ERP signal throughout the Atlanta metropolitan area, making it among the ten highest-powered college radio stations in the United States.

In 2007, WREK applied to the Federal Communications Commission (FCC) to increase its effective radiated power to the maximum power of 100,000 watts (from its former 40,000 watts) with a directional antenna pattern designed to avoid interference with specific distant stations (as required by regulation). This coverage increase was designed to greatly improve the radio station's coverage to encompass more of the Atlanta metropolitan area. That application was subsequently approved, and the station built out the improved coverage by replacing its antenna system in the fall of 2011.

In March 2008, WREK replaced its then 20-year-old transmitter with a brand new unit capable of three times the signal power, while also providing HD Radio. The addition of an HD Radio broadcast has made WREK among the first student-run, student-funded stations in the nation to add digital broadcasting capability.

== Programming ==
Programming is student-run and extremely diverse, including everything from heavy metal to world, hip-hop to blues, classical and jazz to industrial, noise, hyperpop and similarly diverse community programming (Church of the Subgenius). WREK slogans include "music you don't hear on the radio" and "quality diverse radio."

=== Sound blocks ===
Regular rotation programming blocks take up most daytime broadcasts. Certain times focus on certain themes: mornings play Just Jazz and Classics while afternoons transmit RRR (Rock, Rhythm and Roll) and nights air Atmospherics and the notorious Overnight Alternatives. These time slots are staffed by various WREK student staff and feature a wide selection of music, contests, and PSAs. The WREK website maintains a two-week archive of all regular rotation shifts, available as 128 kbit/s and 24 kbit/s downloads.

=== Specialty shows ===
Specialty Shows feature shifts dedicated to a specific genre. They air for over 50 hours a week, mainly in the evenings. They range from the Ramblin' Wreck Sports Show, a Georgia Tech sports talk show hosted by students to Destroy All Music, clatter-improv with pink noise freakouts. Other weekly shows include Electronic Sound System, an experimental electronic show featuring music and in-studio performances of new and established artists that run the electronic gamut; Velvet, featuring classic and contemporary R&B and soul; Live@WREK, a live music show broadcasting local and touring artists and bands; Girl Rock!, highlighting the work of women and non-binary artists worldwide; and 100 wreks, a hyperpop show featuring new and emerging artists in the genre.

=== Sports ===
Over the years, WREK has originated play-by-play coverage of Georgia Tech intercollegiate athletics, including baseball, women's basketball, and volleyball. In fall 2004, the station agreed to partner with ISP Sports to simulcast network coverage of selected Georgia Tech football and men's basketball games to augment WQXI's diminished AM nighttime coverage in metro Atlanta. That partnership ended following the 2007–08 season. The station does not currently provide any live sports play-by-play.

== Technical details ==
WREK's transmitter is a Harris HT/HD+ (named "Janice" by the staff) which outputs a 16.3 kW TPO signal into a high-gain 8-bay ERI (Electronics Research Inc) antenna, resulting in an effective radiated power of 100,000 Watts in the strongest direction. The antenna is located on a 300-foot (90-meter) self-supporting tower adjacent to the Undergraduate Living Center and Woodruff Hall on Georgia Tech's west campus, connected to the studio in the Student Center via a wireless, 950.0 MHz studio-transmitter link, WQAQ311, and a digital, fiber-optic link.

Most systems at WREK were written by students this includes: the staff database, live streaming system, online playlist, and transmitter monitoring scripts. Broadcasting equipment is also student maintained.

== History ==
Georgia Tech was the home of an early AM radio station, WBBF (later WGST, now WGKA AM 920), which began operation in January 1924. Much of this station's initial equipment had been previously used by the Atlanta Constitution's WGM, and was donated through the efforts of the newspaper's editor, Clark Howell. In April 1930, the school made an agreement with the Southern Broadcasting Stations, Inc. to operate WGST as a commercial station, while still under the oversight of Georgia Tech. In 1973, the Georgia Board of Regents decided WGST was "surplus property", and the next year it was sold for five million dollars to the Meredith Corporation, despite opposition from alumni groups, members of the Georgia General Assembly and even the Governor of Georgia. Proceeds from this sale were used to upgrade WREK.

WREK first signed on the air on March 25, 1968, broadcasting at 10 Watts from a 20-foot tower atop the Van Leer Electrical Engineering building on Georgia Tech's campus. Barry James Folsom, then-student, started radio station WREK and was one of first DJs. The studio was located in the top floor of that building and included donated equipment from WSM-FM Nashville. Chief Engineer and then-student Geoff Mendenhall designed and built a 425W power amplifier which, once type certified by the Federal Communications Commission (FCC) in August 1968, brought WREK to 3,400W ERP. In 2013 Mendenhall retired from Harris Broadcast Communications (now GatesAir) as VP of Transmission Research and Technology.

In 1978 WREK's tower and studio were relocated. A new, 300-foot (91 m) tower was built on the western edge of the Georgia Tech campus, and the studio moved to the former WGST studios in the annex of the Alexander Memorial Coliseum (now known as Hank McCamish Pavilion), where it would remain until 2004. Visitors to WREK's Coliseum studios were often startled by its walls, which were covered by thick layers of posters, set lists, and other music memorabilia, as well as the giant electromechanical broadcast automation machines and other large racks of monitoring and control equipment. WREK's studios relocated to the Student Center Commons (formerly the Georgia Tech Bookstore building) in August 2004.

After the renovation of the Wenn Student Center, WREK relocated from their temporary residence in the Office of Information Technology building to their new studio in the newly-renovated Student Center.

WREK began streaming its compressed (8-bit μ-law) broadcast over the Internet on November 7, 1994, making it one of the first Internet radio stations. The station now streams in MP3 format and features a two-week-long running archive of its broadcast on the schedule page of its website.

In December 2002, WREK broadcast the entire 50-disc Merzbox by the Japanese experimental music artist Merzbow. An article in Creative Loafing described the Merzbow Marathon as "what may be the most obscure and counterintuitive move in the history of radio."

Continuing their tradition of unorthodox radio broadcasts, WREK chose to air the long-running heavy metal show WREKage for the entire 24-hour broadcast day on June 6, 2006 (6/6/6). Heavy metal was played in chronological order from midnight to midnight. As an extra nod to the mystic number 666 (number), Iron Maidens The Number of the Beast was aired at 6:06 a.m. and p.m.

In the fall of 2007, the critics of Creative Loafing declared WREK to be the Best Overall Radio Station in the Atlanta metropolitan area. The article describing their reasoning declared WREK to be "strange in a good way. The station's format is noncommercial and nonconforming. Few stations in the city can compete with WREK's eclectic playlist".

== See also ==
- Campus radio
- List of college radio stations in the United States
