= WALR =

WALR may refer to:

- WALR-FM, a radio station (104.1 FM) licensed to Greenville, Georgia, United States
- WIFN (AM), a radio station (1340 AM) licensed to Atlanta, Georgia, which held the call sign WALR from 1995 to 2009
