= WPID =

Piedmont, Alabama; United States
- Frequency: 1280 kHz
- Branding: E-Z 1280 Piedmont

Programming
- Format: Defunct (formerly adult contemporary)

Ownership
- Owner: Piedmont Radio Company

History
- First air date: 1953
- Last air date: 2023
- Call sign meaning: Piedmont

Technical information
- Licensing authority: FCC
- Facility ID: 52550
- Class: D
- Power: 1,000 watts (day); 84 watts (night)
- Transmitter coordinates: 33°55′50″N 85°35′00″W

Links
- Public license information: Public file; LMS

WPID (1280 AM, "E-Z 1280") was a radio station licensed to serve Piedmont, Alabama, United States. The station, established in 1953, was owned by Piedmont Radio Company.

== Programming ==
WPID broadcast an adult contemporary music format. Along with its usual music programming, WPID was the Piedmont affiliate of the Fox News Radio network, Dick Bartley's Rock'n'Roll's Greatest Hits, Dick Bartley's American Gold, and American Top 20 with Casey Kasem.

Each Friday night in high school football season, WPID broadcast each Piedmont High School football game live. Other sporting events that WPID carried included opening day baseball for the Piedmont Parks and Recreation Department and occasional high school basketball games. WPID was an affiliate of the Atlanta Braves radio network from 1986 through 2006, but dropped the broadcasts for of lack of support.

== History ==
This station began broadcasting in 1953 as a 1,000 watt daytime-only station on 1280 kHz licensed to Piedmont Radio Station, Inc. This company, owned and operated by Cary L. Graham, was part of the Cary L. Graham Stations Group along with WETO in Gadsden, WEIS in Centre and WANA in Anniston.

Graham sold WPID to Terrence J. Gladden in 1965. Alex Allen Carwile acquired WPID on April 21, 1977, and operated the station with a country & western music format.

In May 1984, Alex Allen Carwile, doing business as Radio Station WPID, reached an agreement to sell this station to David Brent Morrison and Jimmy Wayne Kennedy, jointly doing business as Piedmont Communications Company. The deal was approved by the FCC on June 15, 1984, and the transaction was consummated the next day.

In November 1993, Piedmont Communications Company agreed to transfer the broadcast license for WPID to Piedmont Radio Company, a sole proprietorship owned by Jimmy Wayne Kennedy. The deal was approved by the Federal Communications Commission (FCC) on December 27, 1993, and the transaction was consummated on January 1, 1994.

== Former on-air staff ==
Longtime country music disc jockey Rhubarb Jones got his first job in radio at WPID. Jones would later go on to be named Medium Market Broadcast Personality of the Year by the Country Music Association Awards in 1983, Large Market Broadcast Personality of the Year by the Country Music Association Awards in 1987, and Disc Jockey of the Year by the Academy of Country Music in 1983. Alabama lead singer Randy Owen sang at Jones' 1988 wedding to Charm Baker.

Gene McKay, Publisher of Inside Radio, a national radio industry trade publication, began his radio career at WPID in 1975 while still in high school.

Bob Mayben, former Engineer in Charge of the CNN Radio Network, worked at WPID in 1964 as a D-J.

Bill "Bubba" Bussey, former co-host of the nationally syndicatedThe Rick and Bubba Show, and current podcast host of "Bubba On The Lake", worked part-time at WPID while he was also directing newscasts at WJSU-TV in nearby Anniston, Alabama.

== Licensing issues ==
Due to an apparent widespread glitch in the FCC's CDBS electronic filing system, WPID's December 2003 application for renewal of its broadcast license was not received by the Commission. As a result, WPID's license was cancelled and its call sign deleted from the FCC database on March 17, 2005. WPID temporarily ceased operation when the licensee, Piedmont Radio Company, was informed of the Commission's actions. The station received special temporary authority to resume broadcasting on April 13, 2005. WPID continued to operate in this fashion until January 31, 2007, when its belated license renewal application was finally approved by the FCC and the WPID call sign fully restored to the FCC database.

On July 24, 2023, Piedmont Radio Company surrendered WPID's license to the FCC, who cancelled it on August 2, 2023.
