= WIOT =

Rock radio station in Toledo, Ohio

- Toledo, Ohio; United States
- Broadcast area: Northwest Ohio; Monroe County, Michigan
- Frequency: 104.7 MHz (HD Radio)
- Branding: 104.7 WIOT

Programming
- Format: Mainstream rock
- Subchannels: HD2: Sports (WCWA)
- Affiliations: United Stations Radio Networks; Westwood One

Ownership
- Owner: iHeartMedia, Inc.; (iHM Licenses, LLC)
- Sister stations: WCKY-FM; WCWA; WRVF; WSPD; WVKS

History
- First air date: October 1949
- Former call signs: WTOL-FM (1949–1965); WCWA-FM (1965–1972)

Technical information
- Licensing authority: FCC
- Facility ID: 19628
- Class: B
- ERP: 50,000 watts
- HAAT: 165 meters (541 ft)
- Transmitter coordinates: 41°40′23″N 83°25′31″W

Links
- Public license information: Public file; LMS
- Webcast: Listen live (via iHeartRadio)
- Website: wiot.iheart.com

WIOT (104.7 FM) is a commercial radio station licensed to Toledo, Ohio, United States, and serves both Northwest Ohio and Monroe County, Michigan. Owned by iHeartMedia, it features a mainstream rock format. WIOT's studios are located in Downtown Toledo while the transmitter resides in the Toledo suburb of Oregon. In addition to a standard analog transmission, WIOT broadcasts over two HD Radio channels and is available online via iHeartRadio.

== History ==
=== WTOL-FM and WCWA-FM ===
In October 1949, the station signed on as WTOL-FM. It was the FM simulcast of WTOL (now WCWA), owned by the family of Toledo prosecutor Frazier Reams. The two stations were ABC Radio affiliates; when network programming shifted from radio to television, WTOL-AM-FM began airing a full service, middle of the road format of popular music, news and sports.

By the 1960s, WTOL-FM had its own format of beautiful music with some classical shows on nights and weekends. As a beautiful music station, WTOL-FM played quarter hour sweeps of mostly soft instrumental cover versions of popular hits. In 1965, it changed its call letters to WCWA-FM to match its AM counterpart. The easy listening format ended on Christmas Day in 1972. The station switched to progressive rock as WIOT and has played some format of rock music since.

=== WIOT ===
The station's call sign came about from doodles using the frequency numbers 1-0-4-7. Newly appointed operations manager Chuck Schmitt was trying to derive the call letters from its dial position, with 1=I 0=O and 7=T. W-I-O-T. The initial "W" is because the station is east of the Mississippi River. It took longtime WIOT engineer Dennis P. Moon to confirm the origin of the call letters. Moon was present when Schmitt created the call sign in 1972 as a derivative on the word "Riot" but with a "W" instead.

"Buck and O'Connor" hosted mornings in the early 1980s, Bucky "Buck" McWilliams and Christopher O'Connor. They left WIOT to go to Milwaukee at WZUU and then Minneapolis at KDWB. Other WIOT disc jockeys during the '80s were Terry Sullivan, one half of the Sullivan and O'Connor show, Lee Randall, Joanie Major, Johnny Ballantine, Mohammed, "Larry Wyatt"-Larry Weseman, Donald "Don" Jardine, and WIOT's first male and female morning duo Pat & Jane (Patrick Still and Janet Perry).

In the late 1980s, Bob and Brian became the next morning team. They also too left for Milwaukee for work at WLZR. The next morning duo was The WIOT's Dawnbusters A.K.A. Jeffrey Lamb and Mark Benson. Jeff provided all of the voices and skits while Mark was the straight man. Other WIOT DJs during this time in the '90's were Program Director Lyn Casey, Michael "Party!" Young, Don Davis, Dave Duran, Rebecca "Becky" Shock, Dennis O'Brian, with Beth Daniels, and the one and only Will Worster. In 1994, The station introduces the second version of the WIOT Dawnbusters: Karlson and McKenzie. After about two years at WIOT, Karlson and McKenzie left for Boston at WZLX. With their departure, WIOT's new owner Enterprise Media rehired the first WIOT's Dawnbusters team, Jeff and Mark.

=== Jacor ownership ===
In 1998, the station was bought by Jacor Media. The new owners tweaked the format a bit, adding more hard rock. Management signed a deal with a syndicated morning show. "The Bob and Tom Show" from WFBQ Indianapolis began airing on WIOT and continues to this day.

In the 1990s, the DJ staff included Susan Gates, Troy Michaels, and Grizzly Brown, while Darrin Arrens was the Program Director. Longtime WIOT DJ Don Davis left the station in 2001 and was replaced by Dave Rossi as PD from WAVF (Wave-FM) in Charleston, South Carolina. Rossi left in 2003 to head back to South Carolina, Troy Michaels took over the afternoon shift and Grizzly Brown moved up to the evening shift.

=== Transmitter and studios ===
In September 2019 WIOT's transmitter site was named the Dennis P Moon Transmitter Site, in honor of engineer Denny Moon's 50 years at the station. Prior to its home on South Superior, the station was located on the third floor of Fort Industry Square.

The station's early studios were at 604 Jackson Street, the site of the former News-Bee building and what is now One Government Center. The longtime owner of WIOT and WCWA was Reams Broadcasting, begun by Fraser Reams Sr. and later by his son, Fraser Junior. Reams also owned WTOL-TV. WTOL-FM's tower was shared with WTOL-TV Channel 11.

=== Broadcast area ===
At 50,000 watts on a tower 541 feet (165 meters) in height above average terrain (HAAT), WIOT is slightly overpowered. At that height, the power should be around 45,000 watts but WIOT is grandfathered at the higher power. The station serves Toledo and Northwest Ohio. But with a good radio its signal also reaches Downtown Detroit, along with Detroit's southern and western suburbs, as well as most of Essex County, Ontario, including Windsor and Leamington.

The signal reaches as far south as Marion, Ohio and Bucyrus, Ohio and into Michigan as far north as Flint, Lapeer, and Port Huron before it starts to interfere with Woodstock, Ontario's CIHR-FM, which is also on 104.7 FM. WIOT also experiences some interference from Geneva, Ohio's WKKY, which is also on 104.7, near the Wheatley, Ontario and Comber, Ontario areas (mostly in the southeastern corner of Essex County).

=== Translator interference ===
During 2011, WIOT was also experiencing interference from FM translator W284BQ in Detroit, which was simulcasting WGPR's The Oasis Smooth Jazz subchannel. The translator was on 104.7, the same frequency as WIOT. In May 2011, WIOT filed a complaint with the FCC. The complaint said that W284BQ interferes with WIOT in the Michigan portion of their broadcast area. WIOT had also solicited comments and reception reports from listeners in the affected area.

Martz Communications Group, which owned the translator station and programs The Oasis, soon established a website.http://www.savetheoasis.com/ It explained the station's position on the issue, stressing that WIOT should not get special treatment on the grounds that it is an Ohio radio station which does not serve Detroit. However, WIOT's protected contour does serve parts of the Detroit area, in part due to its grandfathered status.

On October 18, 2011, the FCC sided with Clear Channel on the issue, and ordered W284BQ to cease operation immediately. Martz would later apply with the FCC to relocate W284BQ to 93.9. But that potentially would interfere with Windsor, Ontario station CIDR-FM, ending that plan. It later attempted to move to 93.5 before giving up on the concept altogether.
