= WAKL (FM) =

Coordinates: 33.867°N 83.829°W

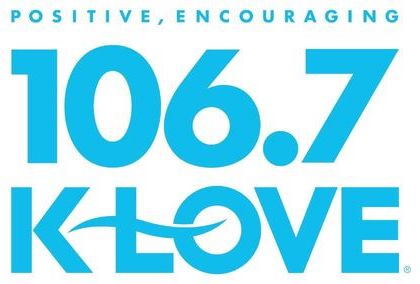
- Gainesville, Georgia; United States
- Broadcast area: Metro Atlanta
- Frequency: 106.7 MHz (HD Radio)
- Branding: 106.7 K-Love

Programming
- Format: Christian adult contemporary
- Subchannels: HD2: K-Love Eras; HD3: K-Love Pop!
- Network: K-Love

Ownership
- Owner: Educational Media Foundation
- Sister stations: WAIA

History
- First air date: April 2, 1949
- Former call signs: WDUN-FM (1949–1976); WWID (1976–1983); WWLT (1983–1984); WYAY (1984–2019)
- Call sign meaning: "Atlanta's K-Love"

Technical information
- Facility ID: 48727
- Class: C
- ERP: 77,000 watts
- HAAT: 505 meters (1,657 ft)
- Translators: 92.5 W223BP (Dallas); 92.3 W222AF (Marietta, relays HD2)

Links
- Webcast: Listen Live
- Website: klove.com

WAKL (106.7 MHz, branded 106.7 K-Love) is a non-commercial FM Christian contemporary radio station licensed to Gainesville, Georgia. Owned by the Educational Media Foundation, WAKL serves the Atlanta metropolitan area as the local affiliate for the national K-Love network. Besides a standard analog transmission, WAKL broadcasts in the HD Radio hybrid format.

WAKL is a Class C FM radio station, with an effective radiated power (ERP) of 77,000 watts. In 1985, the transmitter location was moved from the Gainesville area to a site off Piney Grove Road in Loganville, Georgia, bringing it about 30 miles closer to Intown Atlanta, though Gainesville remains as its city of license. WAKL programming is heard on an FM translator station, 19–watt W223BP, 92.5 MHz in Dallas, Georgia.

== History ==
=== Early years (1949–1984) ===
On April 2, 1949, this facility first signed on as WDUN-FM. It was co-owned with WDUN (1400 AM; now at 550 AM). At first, it was only powered at 300 watts and it simulcast its AM sister station. In the 1960s, the station moved to 106.7 MHz and power was dramatically increased to 50,000 watts. It switched to an automated beautiful music format.

By late 1976, WDUN-FM was WWID "Wide 107", continuing its easy listening format. Then it became WWLT "Lite 106" in early 1983, playing soft adult contemporary music.

=== Country (1984–2008) ===
WWLT was sold to Katz Broadcasting in 1984. On June 25, 1984, the call sign changed to WYAY, flipping to a country music format as "Y106", a moniker it retained until 2000. From 1989 to 1994, Y106 was paired with a station known as "Y104", on the opposite (southwest) side of metro Atlanta, broadcasting at 104.1 MHz. Y106 and Y104 simulcast their programming, except for advertisements. 104.1 FM became urban adult contemporary WALR-FM after it was sold to Cox Radio in late 1994.

In 1993, WYAY was bought by ABC Radio for $19 million. ABC kept the country format in place, with popular disc jockey Rhubarb Jones hosting mornings.

On September 1, 2000, at 3 p.m., the station changed to a classic country format as "Eagle 106.7". The station still played some current music but mainly focused on the classics. The first song on the new "Eagle" was "T-R-O-U-B-L-E" by Marietta native Travis Tritt.

In late 2005, WYAY changed transmitter locations to a new tower in Loganville, that the station shares with Salem-owned WFSH-FM, which improved south metro coverage for the 106.7 signal. In 2007, ABC, under the ownership of The Walt Disney Company, decided to sell all of its radio stations to Citadel Media.

=== Oldies/classic hits (2008–2012) ===
On February 29, 2008, Citadel announced that WYAY would drop its country format for oldies. A majority of the on-air talent was released, including Rhubarb Jones, who had served at the station since 1985. This format change was triggered by Citadel's financial hardships that occurred after the company's purchase of ABC Radio. Jones had been the longest-running morning DJ on Atlanta radio. Dallas McCade and traffic reporter Greg Talmadge were the only on-air survivors of the switch to oldies. They later moved to co-owned country station WKHX. Jones died in 2017.

On March 9, 2008 at 12:56 p.m., WYAY played its last country song, "Stealing Cinderella" by Chuck Wicks. The station then aired a live NASCAR radio broadcast (the Kobalt Tools 500 from Atlanta Motor Speedway). Then at 7:00 p.m., just after the race had finished, the station switched to an oldies format, rebranding itself as "True Oldies 106.7". The first song played was "Revolution" by The Beatles. The station featured the syndicated Imus in the Morning and ABC's The True Oldies Channel all day, similar to a format flip that occurred on sister station WJZW in Washington, D.C., on February 29, 2008. The oldies format had been absent from the metro Atlanta area for several years. WYAY promoted a playlist of over 5,000 songs, while most oldies stations only play a fraction of that many titles.

On November 7, 2008, WYAY announced that it would not carry NASCAR races in 2009, and would become the new FM home of Georgia Tech football and men's basketball.

On April 6, 2009, it was announced that Imus would move from WYAY to talk station WCFO. The "Spiff & Fred Show", hosted by former Fox 97 personality Spiff Carner with co-host Freddie Brooks, moved from afternoons to mornings to replace Imus.

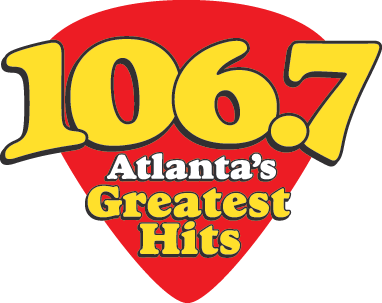
Former logo under the Atlanta's Greatest Hits branding

On November 22, 2010, the station changed its branding to "106.7 Atlanta's Greatest Hits", dropping The True Oldies Channel network, and shifted to a classic hits format featuring a mix of hit songs from the 1970s and 1980s, eliminating most songs from the 1960s.

Citadel merged with Cumulus Media on September 16, 2011.

=== All news (2012–2014) ===
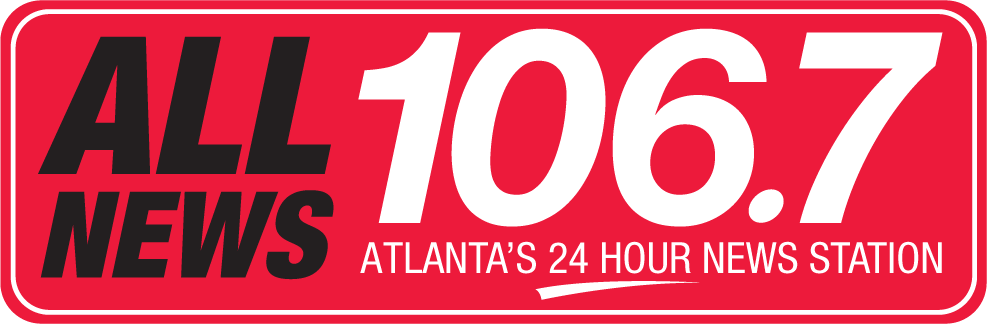
previous "All News Logo"

On April 6, 2012, Cumulus registered the domain name AllNews1067.com. On April 27, Cumulus announced the switch to "All News 106.7" would be sometime in May. CNN Radio, based in Atlanta, had discontinued operations several months earlier, with WYAY hiring many former CNN Radio employees to staff the station, including Greg Black, Maria Boynton, Andy Rose, Andy Flick, Michelle Wright and Jackie Howard. The station also hired Marshall Adams, former program director for KDKA in Pittsburgh. WYAY also partnered with WAGA-TV for weather and traffic reports, as well as WCNN for sports updates. WYAY also aired hourly headlines from ABC News Radio.

In May 2012, an application was filed with the FCC to change the frequency from 106.7 to 106.5, change the city of license from Gainesville to Sandy Springs, and change class from C to C1, any of which would require a rulemaking proceeding to amend the FCC table of allotments. In addition, it would affect co-channel WSKZ in Chattanooga, also owned by Cumulus. That station would have to reduce its signal strength toward the south and southeast to prevent RF interference between the two. WYAY's application lists the Inman Park tower east of downtown Atlanta as the proposed site. This was built for WUPA, although that station has since moved. However, in June 2012, the FCC denied the application.

On May 29, 2012 at 4:50 a.m., WYAY ended its classic hits format by playing "Another One Bites the Dust" by Queen, "Last Dance" by Donna Summer, and "A Day in the Life" by the Beatles. This would be followed by a 10 minute stunt montage of random song and movie soundclips, with a common theme of them being themed around news. At 5:00 a.m., the station began its all-news format. Ratings during this time were poor.

On October 21, 2013, Cumulus announced the first of two changes to the station's programming, with former WGST host Kim Peterson, better known as "The Kimmer", hosting a midday talk and interview program for WYAY known as "Newsmakers" beginning the following month. WYAY also became the flagship station for the Atlanta Braves Radio Network effective with the start of the 2014 season.

=== News/talk (2014–2019) ===
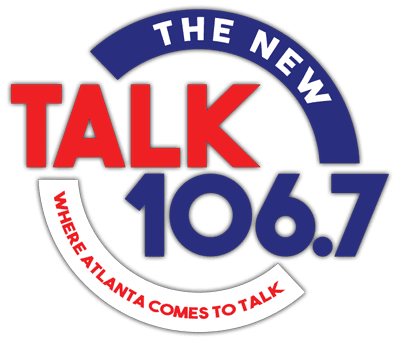
former logo as "The New Talk 106.7", 2018-2019

On May 12, 2014, WYAY relaunched with a news/talk format, branded as "Newsradio 106.7". The station began to focus more on talk shows and slowly phased out its remaining all-news blocks. Over time, the only all-news block was weekday morning drive time. Shortly after this time, WYAY swapped from ABC News to Cumulus' in-house network Westwood One News for its hourly headlines. In January 2018, the station relaunched again as "Talk 106.7" with an emphasis on personality-driven programming, and no all-news blocks.

On February 13, 2019, Cumulus Media announced it would sell six stations, including WYAY, to the Educational Media Foundation for $103.5 million. Also included were stations in New York City, Washington, D.C., San Jose, Savannah and Syracuse. As a result of the impending format change, Atlanta Braves broadcasts would move back to WNNX and WCNN.

=== Christian music (2019–present) ===
On May 31, 2019, WYAY concluded its talk format. Throughout the day, the hosts allowed listeners to call in and share their thoughts about the end of the station. At 7:00 p.m. that evening, EMF officially took over the station and began airing K-Love programming. Upon taking over the station, EMF changed the station's call letters to WAKL, a call sign previously held on the K-Love station in Flint, Michigan.

The Atlanta radio market is now served by three Contemporary Christian music stations: WAKL, sister station WAIA, which plays EMF's nationally syndicated "Air1" network, and WVFJ-FM. All three stations are supported by listener contributions.

EMF turned on the HD signal on July 30, 2019, and has its sister networks "Air1" on 106.7-HD2, and Classic contemporary Christian Music "K-Love Classics" on 106.7-HD3.
