= WRVF =

- Toledo, Ohio; United States
- Broadcast area: Toledo metropolitan area
- Frequency: 101.5 MHz (HD Radio)
- Branding: 101.5 The River

Programming
- Format: Adult contemporary
- Subchannels: HD2: Talk (WSPD)
- Affiliations: Premiere Networks

Ownership
- Owner: iHeartMedia, Inc.; (iHM Licenses, LLC)
- Sister stations: WCKY-FM, WCWA, WIOT, WSPD, WVKS

History
- First air date: August 11, 1946
- Former call signs: WSPD-FM (1946–1971); WLQR (1971–1995)
- Call sign meaning: River

Technical information
- Licensing authority: FCC
- Facility ID: 62188
- Class: B
- ERP: 33,000 watts
- HAAT: 164 meters (538 ft)
- Transmitter coordinates: 41.673°N 83.425°W

Links
- Public license information: Public file; LMS
- Webcast: Listen live (via iHeartRadio)
- Website: 1015theriver.iheart.com

WRVF (101.5 FM "The River") is a commercial radio station in Toledo, Ohio, owned by iHeartMedia, Inc. It broadcasts an adult contemporary radio format, switching to all-Christmas music for much of November and December. WRVF carries the syndicated Delilah music and call-in show in the evening. The radio studios and offices are at Superior and Lafayette in Downtown Toledo.

WRVF has an effective radiated power (ERP) of 33,000 watts. The station's transmitter is located at North Wynn Road at Cedar Point Road in Oregon, Ohio. The signal covers parts of Ohio and Michigan, getting into the Detroit metropolitan area, as well as a small chunk of Ontario. The station broadcasts using HD Radio technology. The HD2 digital subchannel simulcasts the news/talk format of co-owned WSPD 1370 AM.

== History ==
=== WSPD-FM ===
On August 11, 1946, the station signed on the air as WSPD-FM. The station largely simulcast sister station WSPD 1370 AM. They were owned by The Fort Industry Company on Huron Street, which added television station WSPD-TV in 1948 (now WTVG). WSPD-AM-FM were NBC Red Network affiliates, carrying its dramas, comedies, news, sports, soap operas, game shows and big band broadcasts during the "Golden Age of Radio."

As network programming moved from radio to television, WSPD-AM-FM switched to full service middle of the road programming, including popular adult music, news and sports. In the late 1960s, the Federal Communications Commission required many AM-FM combos to offer separate programming. WSPD-FM adopted an adult contemporary format using Drake-Chenault's automated "Hit Parade" package.

=== WLQR Beautiful Music ===
In 1971, WSPD-FM was sold to Susquehanna Broadcasting. It switched its call sign to WLQR and became a beautiful music station, known as "Stereo 101." It played half-hour music tapes mastered at Susquehanna's studios in York, Pennsylvania, with local announcers Steve Kendall, Mike Stanley, Larry Weseman and Bill Stewart.

By the 1980s, the easy listening format's audience was beginning to age, while most advertisers seek out young to middle aged customers. In an effort to stay youthful, WLQR added more vocals and reduced the instrumentals in its playlist.

=== Soft AC ===
In 1987, the station finished its transition to soft adult contemporary, becoming "Soft Rock 101.5 WLQR." By this time the station was again co-owned with WSPD. A few years later the station began stunting by playing "Friends in Low Places" by Garth Brooks with a man with a southern accent announcing that something new was coming to WLQR on Monday. The following Monday the station kept its soft AC format and became "101.5 The River", changing its call letters to WRVF.

The River is among the first stations to go with all Christmas music between mid-November through Christmas Day. This tradition began in 1995, the year the station's call sign changed from WLQR-FM. It was several years before the practice became commonplace for AC stations around North America. WRVF's morning show featured Toledo radio veteran Jack "Mitch" Mitchell until March 31, 2006.

=== Delilah and Casey Kasem ===
WRVF became the new home of the popular "Friday Night '80s" feature in May 2007 after crosstown competitor WWWM-FM (Star 105) dropped it in favor of Delilah six nights a week. Several years later, WRVF became the Delilah affiliate in Toledo. The all-1980s show switched to Saturday nights. The River also aired the 1980s version of Casey Kasem's American Top 40 Saturdays from 6 to 10 p.m., until the show was dropped after Christmas of 2011.

From October 2010 to October 2014, WRVF had a competitor in the AC format in "My 98-3" WMIM, licensed to Luna Pier, Michigan. WMIM switched to a country music format in October 2014, leaving WRVF again as the only mainstream AC station in the market. Also in the fall of 2014, WRVF backed away from its longtime "soft rock" image and began re-imaging itself as "The '80s to Now," with a slightly more contemporary music mix.

=== HD Programming ===
Since 2007, WRVF has been broadcasting in IBOC "HD Radio":

- HD1 programming is the digital version of its analog audio.
- HD2 subchannel broadcasts a simulcast of talk radio sister station WSPD 1370 AM.
- HD3 subchannel broadcast soft adult contemporary music from iHeartRadio's service known as "The Breeze." The HD3 subchannel has since been turned off.

WRVF is also the (LP) Local Primary Emergency Alert System (EAS) station in Northwestern Ohio.
