= WIGO (AM) =

- Morrow, Georgia; United States
- Broadcast area: Atlanta
- Frequency: 1570 kHz
- Branding: WIGO AM 1570

Programming
- Format: Urban adult contemporary

Ownership
- Owner: MCL/MCM Georgia, LLC

History
- First air date: March 21, 1959
- Former call signs: WCPK (1959–1960); WEAS (1960–1961); WEAD (1961–1964); WAIA (1964–1966); WBAD (1966–1968); WSSA (1968–2007)
- Call sign meaning: Heritage call letters of 1340 AM (1968–1995)

Technical information
- Licensing authority: FCC
- Facility ID: 60918
- Class: D
- Power: 5,000 watts day 50 watts night
- Transmitter coordinates: 33°36′5.00″N 84°18′40.00″W

Links
- Public license information: Public file; LMS
- Webcast: Listen Live
- Website: wigoam.com

WIGO (1570 AM) is an urban adult contemporary radio station with some paid brokered programming. Licensed to Morrow, Georgia, it serves the Atlanta metropolitan area. The station is currently owned by MCL/MCM Georgia, LLC.

== History ==
The station operating at 1570 kHz in the Atlanta area first began broadcasting as WCPK, a 1,000-watt daytime-only outlet licensed to College Park, Georgia, on March 21, 1959. The station changed its call letters to WEAS—using a designation freshly vacated by 950 AM, causing confusion—in March 1960, then to WEAD on January 1, 1961; it was a "good music" station with studios at a Hilton Inn near Atlanta International Airport, in Hapeville. College Park Broadcasting Corporation, the original licensee, filed for bankruptcy in 1963, and the station was sold at public auction that April; the buyer was Metro Atlanta Broadcasting. The call letters were changed to WAIA, reflecting its airport location, in 1964.

In 1965, WAIA was acquired by John R. Dorsey for $60,000. A year later, WAIA became WBAD, a Top 40 outlet. The station changed call letters to WSSA and format to country in October 1968, the same month it was acquired by Clayton Broadcasting Company. Two years later, it was authorized to change its city of license to Morrow and increase power to 5,000 watts.

In 1974, WSSA was acquired by Jim Beattie and Jim Simmons, a former station owner elsewhere on the East Coast and a North Carolina auto dealer, respectively. The station continued its country format and also aired NASCAR Winston Cup Series races. By 1978, the station was entirely owned by Simmons, and he sold it to the Piper brothers doing business as South Atlanta Broadcasting in a $345,000 transaction.

The station began airing specialty programs of contemporary Christian music and Christian rock in 1981. A year later, control of the licensee was sold to Wings Radio, in which the Pipers owned a 50 percent stake. The Wings organization was named for Isaiah 40:31 ("but those who hope in the Lord will renew their strength. They will soar on wings like eagles; they will run and not grow weary, they will walk and not be faint."), and the group programmed the station with an entirely Christian format as well as services from more than 50 local churches and news and features for residents of Clayton County.

After changing to talk programming, WSSA adopted a Christian country format in 1995, branded as "God's Country". Southern gospel music was added a year later. Saints, Inc., acquired control of WSSA in 1998.

In the early 2000s, a local marketing agreement was reached with Ritmo Latino, which programmed the station in Spanish. That LMA, and an option to buy the station, were acquired by MCL/MCM in January 2005. The group then bought the station itself for $1.75 million in 2006. The station's call letters were changed to WIGO, reviving a designation that had been used for decades at 1340 AM, the first 24-hour R&B music station in the city.
