= WQXI (AM) =

- Atlanta, Georgia; United States
- Broadcast area: Metro Atlanta
- Frequency: 790 kHz
- Branding: Atlanta Radio Korea

Programming
- Language: Korean

Ownership
- Owner: Kyung Sook Park; (Atlanta Radio Korea, Inc.)

History
- First air date: April 26, 1948
- Call sign meaning: "Quixie"

Technical information
- Licensing authority: FCC
- Facility ID: 30825
- Class: B
- Power: 28,000 watts day; 1,000 watts night
- Transmitter coordinates: 33.811566°N 84.353322°W
- Translator: 96.7 W244EI (Atlanta)

Links
- Public license information: Public file; LMS
- Website: www.atlantaradiokorea.com

WQXI (790 kHz) is an AM radio station licensed to Atlanta, Georgia, United States. Owned by Atlanta Radio Korea, Inc., the station broadcasts Korean-language programming as "Atlanta Radio Korea" and is simulcast in the Atlanta area on FM translator W244EI (96.7 FM). The station has a power of 28,000 watts in the daytime, and 1,000 watts at night. WQXI's signal is non-directional during the daytime, and directional at night. As of 2009, the station broadcast in the IBiquity HD Radio AM hybrid digital mode during daytime hours.

== History ==
former logo

WQXI first went on the air on April 26, 1948, as an all-music station, playing pop standards. Their independent status was unique programming as the established stations, WAGA (590 AM, now WDWD), WSB (750 AM), WGST (920 AM, now WGKA), and WATL (1380 AM, now WAOK) were all network affiliates. By the 1960s, WQXI was Top 40 with the moniker "Quixie in Dixie". Among the station's personalities in the late 1960s was Dr. Don Rose, who went on to near legendary status at KFRC in San Francisco.

For a time, it was owned by Esquire Inc. In the 1970s, WQXI became an oldies station. By the 1980s, WQXI was simulcasting with its FM sister station. In January 1990, WQXI began airing an adult standards format. When Atlanta hosted the 1996 Olympic Games, the station simulcast the French radio news channel France Info for several hours a day. During the mid-1990s, WQXI began leasing airtime to various broadcasters, and also aired Spanish-language music for several hours a day as "La Pantera" (The Panther).

The former WQXI-FM "94Q" (originally WDJK) became WSTR (94.1 FM) "Star 94", and WQXI-TV became WXIA-TV.

On January 1, 1997, WQXI became the Atlanta affiliate of the KidStar children’s radio network; however, this would only last a few months. On April 7, 1997, WQXI flipped to a sports radio format as "790 the Zone", programmed by Big League Broadcasting under a local marketing agreement with WQXI's owner, Jefferson-Pilot Corporation. Jefferson-Pilot merged with Lincoln National Corporation in 2006; in 2010, Lincoln Financial Media bought the assets of Big League Broadcasting and retook full control of WQXI's programming. WQXI was the AM radio flagship of the Atlanta Falcons, and until 2013, WQXI was the flagship station of the Georgia Tech Yellow Jackets radio network. The station formerly broadcast the syndicated Yahoo! Sports Radio during the overnight hours.

For many years, WQXI was hobbled by signal issues. Even with its 28,000-watt daytime signal, it only provides grade B coverage to several of Atlanta's outer suburbs. At night, it is almost unlistenable outside of Atlanta itself. To solve this problem, it was simulcast in HD Radio on WSTR's HD2 subchannel. WQXI's audio was also broadcast on Channel 18 of the Georgia Tech Cable Network.

On May 20, 2014, Lincoln Financial Media dropped WQXI's local programming and became a full-time affiliate of ESPN Radio. The station's Atlanta Falcons broadcasts were not affected by the change.

On December 8, 2014, Entercom announces that it was purchasing Lincoln Financial Group's entire 15-station lineup (including WQXI) in a $106.5 million deal, and would operate the outlets under a LMA deal until the sale is approved by the FCC. The sale was approved on July 14, 2015.

On July 1, 2015, ESPN Radio announced it would end its programming on WQXI and move it to Dickey Broadcasting-owned rivals WFOM and WCNN on August 17. After that date, WQXI began simulcasting sister WSTR, effectively taking it back to its roots as an all-music station.

On September 30, 2016, Entercom announced that it had sold WQXI to Kyung Sook Park's Atlanta Radio Korea, Inc. for $850,000 plus a time brokerage agreement prior to closing. The sale was approved by the FCC on November 29, and completed on December 14. On December 15, WQXI flipped to the Radio Korea format. The station's programming is simulcast on FM translator W244EI at 96.7 MHz.

== WKRP connection ==
In 1978, WQXI provided inspiration for WKRP in Cincinnati, a television sitcom about a radio station. Series creator Hugh Wilson dealt with WQXI when he worked in advertising. WKRP's early episodes about dropping turkeys from a helicopter and the "dancing ducks promotion", in which ducks danced on hot plates, were stunts actually done by Jerry Blum at WQXI in the early 1970s. Blum had leased an 18-wheeler from which he tossed hundreds of live turkeys at a suburban Atlanta shopping center.

== 2013 controversy ==
On June 17, 2013, during WQXI's morning program Mayhem in the AM hosts Steak Shapiro, Chris Dimino and Nick Cellini mocked New Orleans Saints player Steve Gleason and amyotrophic lateral sclerosis (ALS) (also known as Lou Gehrig's disease) diagnosis. The trio used a robotic-sounding voice to imitate Gleason, who speaks with a voice synthesizer, and told several knock-knock jokes about him. Station management suspended the three hosts as soon as the program went off the air, and fired them later that afternoon. Station vice-president and General Manager Rick Mack apologized for the incident. Shapiro and Dimino subsequently moved to rival WCNN, which overtook WQXI as Atlanta's leading sports talk station. WQXI never recovered from the loss of Shapiro and Dimino, a factor behind its decision to become a full-time satellite of ESPN Radio. It soon later became the factor behind WQXI to drop its sports radio format in favor of simulcasting WSTR due to declining ratings because of this controversy.
