= Rhubarb Jones =

American radio personality (1951–2017)

- Born: Warren Jones; August 9, 1951; Miami
- Died: April 2, 2017 (aged 65); Haralson County, Georgia
- Education: Shorter College
- Spouse: Donna
- Children: 2
- Awards: Country Music Disc Jockey Hall of Fame
- Presenting career
- Station: WYAY "Eagle 106.7"
- Country: United States

Warren "Rhubarb" Jones (August 9, 1951 – April 2, 2017) was an American DJ at WYAY "Eagle 106.7" in Atlanta, Georgia. He was the longest running morning radio personality in the Atlanta radio market, having been at the 106.7 spot on the FM dial from January 1985 to February 29, 2008.

== Life and career ==
Warren Jones was born in Miami and grew up in Tallapoosa, Georgia. His first job in radio was at WPID in Piedmont, Alabama.

He worked his way through West Georgia College by working in radio at WWCC in Bremen, Georgia. Upon graduation, Rhubarb moved to Columbus, Georgia, and worked at WCLS. He later got into country music radio when he moved to WSKY AM in Asheville, North Carolina. In 1978, Rhubarb headed to WLWI-FM (I-92) in Montgomery, Alabama, where he served as program and music director and did the afternoon drive show.

Jones was widely known for his charity events like the Rhubarb Jones Celebrity Golf Tournament for the Leukemia and Lymphoma Society and his annual March Across Georgia for the LLS. Rhubarb was also an Atlanta co-host for the annual Jerry Lewis Muscular Dystrophy Association Telethon with WAGA TV 5 weathercaster Ken Cook.

Jones was a past winner of Radio Personality of the Year from the Country Music Association and the Academy of Country Music and served on the board of directors for both organizations.

He was a past Disc Jockey of the Year award recipient, from Billboard Magazine, and was voted one of Country Music's Top Radio Personalities of the Century by Radio and Records Magazine. Rhubarb was a lifetime member of the Country Music Association and the Academy of Country Music. He was inducted into the Country Music Disc Jockey Hall of Fame in June 2001. In 2007, he was one of the first inductees into the Georgia Radio Hall of Fame.

He had a few small acting parts on television (In the Heat of the Night) and movies (Major League: Back to the Minors, Remember the Titans). He was also a ring announcer for World Championship Wrestling from 1989 to 1992.

== Later career ==
Jones was appointed to the Georgia State Board of Technical and Adult Education in 1998 and served as vice-chairman from 2003 to 2005. He served on the adult literacy committee of DTAE and on the board until January 2007. He also served on the board of trustees of his college alma mater, the University of West Georgia. In May 2006, the UWG booster club honored him with the establishment of the Rhubarb Jones Scholarship for needy and deserving students at the University of West Georgia.

Jones held a Master of Arts degree from Shorter College. He was inducted into Sigma Beta Delta honor society of business, management, and administration in April 2006. In September 2006, Jones was appointed to the board of visitors of Shorter College, and in January 2007 was honored by being named in the Who's Who Among American Universities & Colleges.

On February 29, 2008, Jones was dismissed from WYAY, along with 12 others from WYAY and sister station WKHX-FM. On April 21, 2008, it was announced that Jones would be a senior director of development and a member of adjunct faculty as a distinguished lecturer of mass communications at Kennesaw State University in Kennesaw, Georgia. He also served as director of special projects for KSU as a senior development officer. On August 16, 2014, Rhubarb began hosting a weekend show on KOOL Classic Hits WRBZ 95.5 in Montgomery. This once again joined Rhubarb with Don Day, whom he teamed up with in 1978 as part of the air staff at WLWI in Montgomery.

== Family ==
Jones died while married to his fourth wife, Donna (m. 1999); the couple had two daughters, Presley Frances and Callie Reeves

== Death ==
Jones died on April 2, 2017, at the age of 65 in Haralson County, Georgia, following a heart attack.
