= Denny Schaffer =

Denny Schaffer is a radio talk show host based in Toledo, Ohio. He left WQQO to host The 5:30 Club on 93.5 WRQN. He previously hosted a morning show on WWWM-FM, WRNO-FM and an evening show on WGKA 920 in Atlanta from 9 - 11 pm which WGKA moved to 8- 10 pm a few months before Denny was offered a gig in New Orleans.

Schaffer came to Atlanta to host a show on 640 WGST until November 21, 2006, when Clear Channel, the company which owns WGST, replaced all of its local hosts with syndicated programming.

Denny has since done several guest host spots on the nationally syndicated radio talk show "The Glenn Beck Program" as well as launched an Internet-based talk show named "DennyRadio 24/7", which aired weekdays at 10 AM until the WGKA program began.

Prior to working at WGST, Denny was a host on WSPD, also in Toledo. Before WSPD, Denny was a DJ for the "Breakfast Club" on WVKS 92.5 FM. During the mid-1980s, Schaffer worked at WCZY Z95.5 FM (now WKQI) as "Dancin'" Denny Schaffer, host of the "Z Zoo at Night." Afternoon Drive on 99.5 WLOL in Minneapolis.

== DennyRadio.com ==
DennyRadio.com (DennyRadio 24/7) began in June 2007, and was the home of Schaffer's live 10 AM-12 noon Internet show until October 2009. During the Internet show's run, it was also simulcast back to his former home market of Toledo, via WCWA AM 1230.

The current site broadcasts and archives Schaffer's evening show on Atlanta's WGKA. The program is no longer broadcast on Toledo radio, though Northwest Ohio listeners can continue to hear Schaffer via the Internet site.
