= WSPD =

Talk radio station in Toledo, Ohio

- Toledo, Ohio; United States
- Broadcast area: Toledo metropolitan area
- Frequency: 1370 kHz
- Branding: News Radio 92.9 and 1370 WSPD

Programming
- Format: Conservative talk
- Affiliations: Fox News Radio; Premiere Networks; Compass Media Networks

Ownership
- Owner: iHeartMedia, Inc.; (iHM Licenses, LLC)
- Sister stations: WCKY-FM, WCWA, WIOT, WRVF, WVKS

History
- First air date: August 24, 1923
- Former call signs: WTAL (1923–1928)
- Call sign meaning: Speedene, a gasoline brand from former owner Fort Industry Oil Co.

Technical information
- Licensing authority: FCC
- Facility ID: 62187
- Class: B
- Power: 5,000 watts
- Transmitter coordinates: 41°36′3.2″N 83°32′10.8″W
- Translator: 92.9 W225AM (Toledo)
- Repeater: 101.5 WRVF-HD2 (Toledo)

Links
- Public license information: Public file; LMS
- Webcast: Listen live (via iHeartRadio)
- Website: wspd.iheart.com

WSPD (1370 AM) is a commercial radio station licensed to Toledo, Ohio, United States, that features a conservative talk format. Owned by iHeartMedia, the station serves the Toledo metropolitan area as the area affiliate for Fox News Radio and the Cleveland Guardians Radio Network, and is the local home for Toledo Rockets athletics. WSPD's studios are located in Downtown Toledo, while the transmitter resides in Perrysburg Township. In addition to a standard analog transmission, WSPD is relayed over low-power Toledo translator W225AM (92.9 FM), is simulcast over the second digital subchannel of WRVF, and is available online via iHeartRadio.

== History ==
=== WTAL ===
WSPD is Toledo's oldest radio station. It was first authorized by telegram on August 24, 1923 as WTAL, with the station signing on the next day. The original owner was the Toledo Radio & Electric Company at 433 Superior St. The call sign was randomly assigned from a sequential list of available call letters.

On July 11, 1927, George B. Storer formed the Fort Industry Oil Co., which initially sold petroleum products in Toledo and Cleveland. The company became an advertiser over WTAL. In 1928, Storer and brother-in-law J. Harold Ryan arranged to become investors in the station,

=== WSPD ===
The new owners renamed the station WSPD, after the "Speedene" brand of gasoline. The initial broadcast as WSPD was scheduled for 9:30 a.m. on February 21, 1928. One local publication said "we are informed that the management has also changed and some very elaborate programs are promised". The studios moved in 1928 to The Commodore Perry Hotel where the station's master antenna system became a landmark along with the hotel's rooftop signage.

In 1931, Fort Industry Oil sold its petroleum business to concentrate on radio, and "Oil" was dropped from its corporate name. Fort Industry gained full control of WSPD in 1937. In 1952, it became the Storer Broadcasting Co.

=== New Antenna and Frequency ===
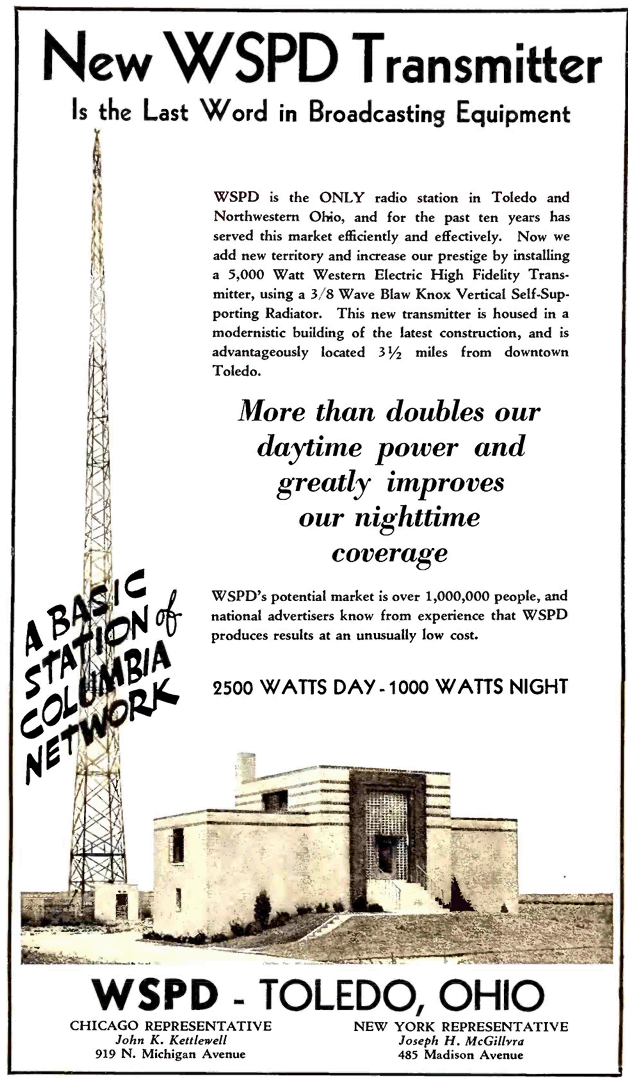
Station advertisement (1935)

In 1935, the WSPD radio transmitter site on Oregon Road went on the air. The antenna system on the roof of the Commodore Perry Hotel remained a part of the Toledo city skyline, even though it was no longer transmitting WSPD's signal.

On March 29, 1941, under the provisions of the North American Regional Broadcasting Agreement (NARBA), WSPD moved to 1370 kHz. For decades, the station was commonly known as "Speedy 1370". Some locals still refer to the station as "Speedy" although that nickname is no longer officially used on the air. (Recently, traffic reports on WSPD were renamed "Speedy Traffic," a nod to the heritage slogan). For much of its history, WSPD was an affiliate of the NBC Red Network, carrying its dramas, comedies, news, sports, soap operas, game shows and big band broadcasts, during the "Golden Age of Radio."

In October 1941, the original towers atop the 18-story Commodore Perry Hotel were dismantled. The broadcast towers had become a familiar Downtown Toledo landmark but had not been operated since 1935 when the stations present transmitter location went on the air.

=== FM and TV Stations ===
In 1946, WSPD added a sister station, WSPD-FM 101.5 MHz (now WRVF). And in 1948, WSPD-TV went on the air. The TV station's call letters changed to WTVG in 1979 when the radio stations were sold off to Wood Broadcasting, and Storer Broadcasting retained control of the TV station. An FCC regulation at the time dictated that TV and radio stations in the same market, but with different ownership, had to have differing call signs.

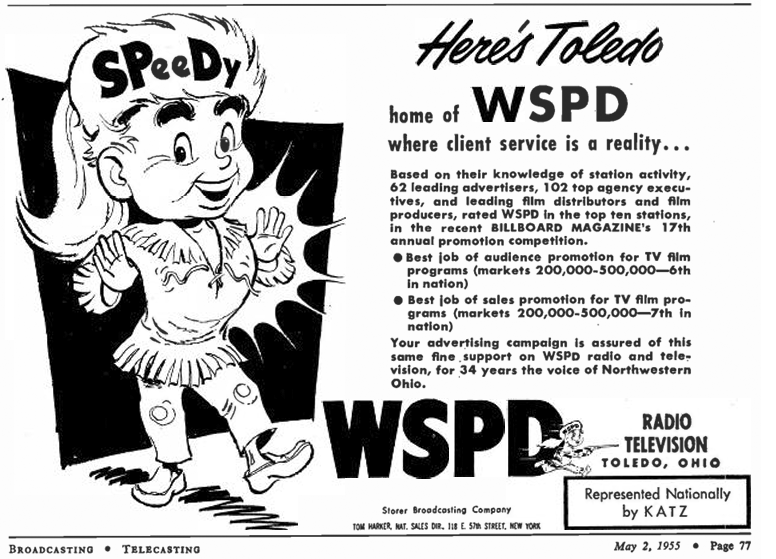
Station advertisement (1955)

WSPD was the flagship station of Storer Broadcasting until late 1979, when it was spun off to "WSPD, Inc." Toledo Broadcasting Inc. acquired the station in 1986; eventually it would be sold to Jacor, which sold the station in 1999 to iHeartMedia, Inc. (formerly Clear Channel Communications). In the early 1990s as well as across the country radio consolidation affected the small independent stations, WSPD transitioned from a full-service adult contemporary/MOR station to its current corporate news/talk format - mainly with a slight partisan conservative focus - and became known as "News Radio 1370 WSPD." The station went by the slogan "News/Talk 1370" from late 2005 until the winter of 2011. The station has since reverted to the "News Radio 1370 WSPD" slogan.

Former logo prior to addition of FM simulcast

=== Past Personalities ===
Although only 5,000 watts, WSPD had enormous influence in the Toledo media market due to the station's once high ratings. Some on-air alumni of WSPD include: Connie Desmond, Art Barrie, Jim Ubelhart, Jeanne Overton, Bob Seybold, Randy Huston, Jean Shepherd, Bob Martz, Don Edwards, Neal Carmean, Chuck Parmelee, Ed Hunter, Jerry Keil, Eddie Kootz, Frank Venner, Ron Tindall, Bill Nordstrom, Ted Dalaku, Jim Donkel, Kent Slocum, Jack Mitchell, Mary Beth Zolik (Mitch & Mary Beth in the morning) Ed Burns (who had the station's first overnight country show), Gene Packard, Lee Conklin, Jim Harpen, Bill Stewart, Jude LaCava, Joe Gunderman, Dave Macy, Lee Kirk, Mike Shepherd, Pat Brogan, Deborah Boyce, Roy E. Blair - News Announcer & Broadcast Standards Manager, Rich Hoffer, Jerry Anderson, Larry Weseman, Art Edgerton, Lou Hebert, Buddy Carr, Mike Stanley, Paul Stowers, Paul W. Smith, Jim (Ted) Bayer, Doug Bermick, Maggie Moore, Paula Pennypacker, Sean Baligian, Scott Sloan, City Councilman Dennis Lange, Mark Standriff, Dick Scott, Bob Frantz, Denny Schaffer and Brian Wilson.

WSPD was also instrumental in the early singing career of Toledo-native Teresa Brewer, who performed on the radio station as a child in the 1930s. Deborah Boyce hosted the first nightly jazz show in the country on AM radio from 1977-1979.

=== HD Radio and Translator ===
On September 14, 2007, WSPD began 24-hour HD radio broadcasting. WSPD formerly broadcast in AM Stereo in the 1980s and 90s. By 2018, WSPD had discontinued HD IBOC broadcasting. But as of 2020, a stereo audio feed of WSPD is broadcast over sister station 101.5 WRVF-HD2.

On October 21, 2015, WSPD added an FM translator at 92.1 MHz, W221BG. While the transmitter was in the testing and measurement phase, it was on and off-air. The former location of the translator was in Rudolph, Ohio. The translator is owned by Educational Media Foundation (EMF), parent company of the Christian radio networks "Air 1" and "K-Love." iHeart media leased the translator from EMF. That translator is now W220EM at 91.9 MHz, simulcasting EMF's WPAY, and iHeart has since moved WSPD programming to a new translator, 92.9 W225AM.

== Programming ==
Fred LeFebvre is the station's lone local personality in morning drive; the remainder of WSPD's schedule is sourced by programming from Premiere Networks and Compass Media Networks. WSPD is additionally the flagship of University of Toledo Rockets football and men's basketball, and the Toledo affiliate for the Cleveland Guardians Radio Network.
