= Georgia Tech Cable Network =

TV provider in Atlanta, Georgia, USA

- Atlanta, Georgia; United States

Ownership
- Owner: Georgia Institute of Technology

History
- First air date: 1995
- Last air date: 2022

The Georgia Tech Cable Network (GTCN) was the on-campus television provider of the Georgia Institute of Technology in Atlanta, Georgia, United States. Established in 1995, GTCN served the on-campus buildings, especially Georgia Tech Housing.

== Content ==
They had a 123-channel lineup, 24 of which were HD, and two of which (channels 20 and 21) they generate content for themselves. In particular, they had a show called "Ramblin' Research" that showed professors' research and personal interests. In addition, they showed many recent movies. The network was also part of the Georgia Tech emergency notification system.

Dish Network provided most of GTCN's non-original programming. The service also rebroadcast several Atlanta-area high-definition channels taken directly from local over-the-air broadcasts. GTCN also had one of the widest selections of international channels of cable networks in the United States.

== History ==
The Georgia Tech Cable Network was initially established in 1995 and had 54 channels. There was an interactive show called TutorVision, where Georgia Tech students called in questions to be worked live on TV. Other past shows include Tech Shorts and Dr. Staff, humor shows about life at Georgia Tech.

GTCN used to broadcast WREK-FM, Georgia Tech's student-run radio station, on channel 17 from 2003 to early 2009. According to then general manager, Trey Rhodes, the station was “never really notified about [GTCN taking us off the channel], no warning beforehand at all." The station management had an agreement with GTCN that they would be receiving another channel for their new HD content, but instead were demoted to background music for the channel guide. Carol Pulliam, the general manager of GTCN, defended this decision by stating that demoting WREK-FM would allow for the creation of three more HD channels on the network.

This service was discontinued in Fall of 2022.
