= WKVR-FM (Pennsylvania) =

Huntingdon, Pennsylvania; United States
- Frequency: 92.3 MHz

Programming
- Format: Defunct (was college radio)

Ownership
- Owner: Juniata College

History
- First air date: March 1978
- Last air date: 2022

Technical information
- Licensing authority: FCC
- Facility ID: 32952
- Class: D
- ERP: 13 watts
- HAAT: −81.0 meters (−265.7 ft)
- Transmitter coordinates: 40°30′0.00″N 78°0′52.00″W

Links
- Public license information: Public file; LMS
- Website: Official website

WKVR-FM (92.3 FM) was a radio station licensed to Huntingdon, Pennsylvania, United States. The station was owned by Juniata College.

WKVR-FM signed on in March 1978; its license was granted on August 7, 1978. The license expired unrenewed on August 1, 2022, leading to the Federal Communications Commission (FCC) canceling it on November 7.
