= WIFN (AM) =

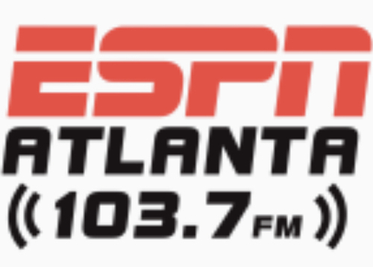

Atlanta, Georgia; United States
- Broadcast area: Atlanta metropolitan area
- Frequency: 1340 kHz
- Branding: ESPN Atlanta 103.7 FM

Programming
- Format: Sports
- Affiliations: ESPN Radio

Ownership
- Owner: Dickey Broadcasting
- Sister stations: WFOM, WCNN

History
- First air date: 1947 (as WAKE)
- Former call signs: WBGE (1947–1955); WAKE (1955–1965); WIGO (1965–1995); WALR (5/12/1995-9/11/2009)
- Call sign meaning: W I FaN

Technical information
- Licensing authority: FCC
- Facility ID: 1098
- Class: C
- Power: 1,000 watts unlimited
- Transmitter coordinates: 33.748958°N 84.407423°W
- Translator: 103.7 W279CZ (Atlanta)

Links
- Public license information: Public file; LMS

WIFN (1340 kHz "ESPN Atlanta 103.7 FM"), is an Atlanta AM radio station. The station is currently broadcasting a sports format, and is a sister station to WCNN "680 The Fan", running programming from ESPN Radio.

== History and ownership ==
The station is co-owned with AM radio stations WCNN AM 680 and WFOM AM 1230. All three stations are owned by Dickey Broadcasting, with studios adjacent to Truist Park in Cobb County. The station previously aired a Spanish language sports/talk format and a gospel music format.

As WALR this station simulcast their former sister station WALR-FM (then known as "Kiss 104.7").

This station was a simulcast of WFOM on two occasions. In earlier years (as WIGO), the station was a black talk-formatted station with studios located on the west side of the city, and well before that (as WAKE), a well-known rock station, with studios at the Georgian Terrace Hotel on Peachtree Street in downtown Atlanta, and previously, initially was WBGE.

Since WCNN acquired Braves radio rights in 2010, WIFN broadcasts all weekday Spring Training games while WCNN broadcasts all weekend games. WIFN is also used as an alternate station for Braves coverage in the event of a conflict.

== Facilities and callsign ==
WIFN's transmitting facility and tower is located in southwest Atlanta near the Atlanta University Center campus. Originally as WBGE then as WAKE (now assigned to a station in Valparaiso, Indiana), it broadcast from the Georgian Terrace Hotel. It was later WIGO (calls now on WIGO AM 1570 locally). "WIFN" was previously on a station in nearby Macon, Georgia, which is now WLXF 105.5 there.
