= WVKS =

- Toledo, Ohio; United States
- Broadcast area: Toledo metropolitan area
- Frequency: 92.5 MHz (HD Radio)
- Branding: 92.5 KISS FM

Programming
- Format: Contemporary hits
- Subchannels: HD2: Mainstream urban "94.9 The Beat"
- Affiliations: Premiere Networks

Ownership
- Owner: iHeartMedia, Inc.; (iHM Licenses, LLC)
- Sister stations: WCKY-FM, WCWA, WIOT, WRVF, WSPD

History
- First air date: October 14, 1957
- Former call signs: WMHE (1957–1990)
- Call sign meaning: Kiss FM

Technical information
- Licensing authority: FCC
- Facility ID: 48964
- Class: B
- ERP: 50,000 watts
- HAAT: 146 meters (479 ft)
- Transmitter coordinates: 41.532°N 83.594°W
- Translator: HD2: 94.9 W235BH (Perrysburg)

Links
- Public license information: Public file; LMS
- Webcast: Listen live (via iHeartRadio); Listen live (HD2)
- Website: 925kissfm.iheart.com; 949thebeat.iheart.com (HD2)

WVKS (92.5 FM) also known as 92.5 KISS-FM is a commercial station in Toledo, Ohio, with a top 40 (CHR) format. It is owned by iHeartMedia with studios at Superior and Lafayette in downtown Toledo. 92.5 KISS-FM carries several nationally syndicated programs including Mojo in the Morning from WKQI Detroit and On Air with Ryan Seacrest from KIIS-FM Los Angeles.

WVKS has an effective radiated power (ERP) of 50,000 watts, the maximum for most Ohio FM stations. The transmitter is off Neiderhouse Road in Perrysburg Township, Ohio. WVKS broadcasts using HD Radio technology. Its HD2 subchannel carries an urban contemporary format known as "94.9 The Beat." That feeds FM translator W235BH, also in Perrysburg.

== History ==
=== Classical and Beautiful Music ===
The station signed on the air on October 14, 1957. The original call sign was WMHE. It was founded by William A. Hillebrand (1917–2005). Though FM broadcasting was still in its infancy at the time, Hillebrand saw FM radio, with its superior sound quality for musical recordings, as an investment that would prove viable in the long run. "He foresaw something that he thought was going to be successful and he was right," his widow, Marvel Hillebrand, told The Toledo Blade after his death in 2005. The call letters stood for "Wired Music Hillebrand Electronics".

WMHE's initial format consisted of "fine arts" music programming, including classical, jazz, and big band music. Hillebrand also used WMHE to transmit the new Muzak subscription service to businesses and restaurants in the Toledo area by using a subsidiary communications authority or SCA. The subcarrier channel can only be heard through special receivers used to distribute Muzak. The station's transmitter was located behind the studio building on Bancroft Street next to Hillebrand Electronics, a store also owned and operated by Hillebrand. Over time, the main channel switched to an automated beautiful music format, playing quarter hour sweeps of mostly soft, instrumental cover versions of popular adult songs.

In the early 1970s, Hillebrand wanted to expand his Muzak coverage area and constructed a taller tower at a new site near Perrysburg, Ohio. The antenna was 550 feet (170 m) high and the transmitter gave WMHE 50,000 watts of power, the maximum for most FM stations in Ohio. With his new transmitter, Hillebrand could now offer Muzak to places as far away as Lima, Ohio, and Fort Wayne, Indiana. The programming on the regular FM channel remained beautiful music.

=== Switch to Rock ===
In 1975, Hillebrand decided to capitalize on the popularity of rock and roll so a new staff was hired to relaunch the station. Disc jockeys included Dave Deppish (mornings), Mark Howell (middays), Mike O'Mara (evenings), and Larry Weseman (nights). In the spring of 1975, Toledo's newest album oriented rock (AOR) station debuted with The Doobie Brothers "Listen to the Music". Within a year, more DJs were hired including Timm Morrison (later of WWWM-FM and WMJC in Detroit) and Bob Crowley.

WMHE, with its unique blend of rock and roll, became a popular Toledo station, scoring its highest ratings during middays. Because of the large coverage area, it became popular in sections of Ohio, Michigan, and Indiana. The station gained in popularity when many of the stores that carried Muzak, would switch over to the main audio channel in order to pull in WMHE. Its primary competition was WIOT, and some of the WIOT jocks joined the WMHE airstaff over the next few years. They included Dorien Pastor (founder of WIOT), John Fisher as the new morning man and program director (now at KHTP-Seattle), and Bob Thomas. Toledo jock Buddy Carr was also part of the airstaff in 1976. Rick Bird was news director for a time with other news personalities Tom Waniewski and Chris O'Connor both from the University of Toledo.

Because of Mr. Hillebrand's fascination with new radio technology, WMHE was partially automated. The automation consisted of a bank of six cartridge "carousels" each holding 24 tape cartridges. All of the music was on these cartridges or "carts" (similar to 8-track tapes), but only one item (a song, a voicetrack, or a commercial) was on each cart. The jocks would record their announcements on individual carts, usually introducing a song or back-announcing a few songs that had just played in the carousel. Portions of the morning and evening shows were performed 'live'.

WMHE operated in this fashion (promoting itself "turn MHE [me] on") through 1978 at which time the format was briefly changed to disco. Following much anger from its listeners (and major damage to the station's sign out front) disco was dumped and the format was changed back to rock. By 1981, the station changed to an equally successful Adult contemporary format. In the early 1980s, WMHE was named one of the 500 most-listened-to stations in the country.

=== Top 40 WMHE & WVKS ===
WMHE switched to Top 40/CHR in Spring 1984, and was also the market's affiliates for both Casey Kasem's American Top 40 and Rick Dees Weekly Top 40. Hillebrand later sold WMHE to Osborn Communications on September 10, 1985. Nearly three years later, Osborn sold it to Noble Broadcasting on May 5, 1988. To compete better with then rival WRQN, 93Q, the station dropped the call letters WMHE in 1990 in favor of WVKS and moved to an Adult Top 40 presentation. Their slogan was "The Right Music, Right Now." The new "92.5 KISS FM" became a ratings powerhouse in Toledo (especially after WRQN left the CHR format to flip to Oldies in October 1991), consistently racking up 12+ shares in the double digits and challenging the market's longtime ratings leaders, country-formatted WKKO (K100) and rocker (and future sister station) WIOT. The ratings boom came largely as a result of station manager Andy Stewart's decision to hire DJ's Denny Schaffer (mornings), Johny D (Afternoon Drive) and Billy Michaels (nights).

In mid-1996, the station was sold to Jacor Communications, and its dominance continued. WVKS left its original studio on Bancroft Street and moved downtown to the Superior Street studios of sister stations WRVF and WSPD in 1998 when iHeartMedia (then Clear Channel Communications) took over operations. Shortly thereafter 92.5 KISS FM lost its individual identity and became part of Clear Channel's standard issue KISS format. During the late 1990s and early 2000s, the station got more competition in the form of urban stations WJUC and WJZE in (March 2005) as well as another CHR station, Cumulus Media's WTWR-FM (Tower 98-3), which moved from Monroe, Michigan to achieve better coverage of the market; WTWR has since switched to adult contemporary music and re-focused on Monroe as "My 98-3" WMIM, leading WVKS to once again have the CHR format all to itself in Toledo. While no longer the ratings giant it was in the 1990s, 92.5 KISS FM remains among Toledo's top five most listened-to stations among all (12+) listeners.

former logo

=== HD Radio ===
On September 15, 2014, WVKS-HD2 began simulcasting on 94.9 W235BH, a former simulcast of WSPD. After a one-day stunt of Christmas music, it began to broadcast urban contemporary music as "94.9, The Beat". Previous to this, WVKS-HD2 aired a canned EDM format provided by iHeartRadio.
