= WCKY-FM =

Coordinates: 41.139°N 83.246°W

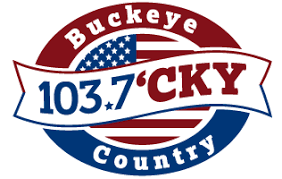
- Pemberville, Ohio; United States
- Broadcast area: Toledo, Ohio
- Frequency: 103.7 MHz
- Branding: Buckeye Country 103.7 'CKY

Programming
- Format: Classic country
- Affiliations: Premiere Networks

Ownership
- Owner: iHeartMedia, Inc.; (iHM Licenses, LLC)
- Sister stations: WCWA, WIOT, WRVF, WSPD, WVKS

History
- First air date: 1963 (as WTTF-FM)
- Former call signs: WTTF-FM (1963–1999)

Technical information
- Licensing authority: FCC
- Facility ID: 70526
- Class: B
- ERP: 50,000 watts
- HAAT: 131 meters (430 ft)

Links
- Public license information: Public file; LMS
- Webcast: Listen Live
- Website: buckeyecountry1037.iheart.com

WCKY-FM (103.7 MHz, "Buckeye Country 103.7") is a radio station licensed to Pemberville, Ohio. Owned by iHeartMedia, the station - branded as Buckeye Country 103.7 CKY - features a classic country format, and is the Toledo affiliate for The Bobby Bones Show.

From its inception until 2008, the station was licensed to (and originally broadcast from) Tiffin, Ohio where the transmitter is located. Originally it simulcast and was a sister station to WTTF, now an AM station at 1600 kHz. WCKY-FM's studios and offices are located at Superior and Lafayette in downtown Toledo.

== History ==
=== Beginnings: as WTTF-FM ===
WCKY-FM first signed on the air as WTTF-FM in 1963, four years after the premiere of its AM sister. The station was founded by Robert G. Wright and Milton Maltz, who formed Malrite Communications, based in Cleveland, Ohio. The station first broadcast from its AM transmitter site at an effective radiated power of 3,000 watts at the time of its inception.

In the mid-1980s, WTTF-FM was granted a construction permit to operate at an effective radiated power of 50,000 watts making 103.7's signal listenable over much of Northwest Ohio. WTTF, Inc. built a new tower on County Road 48 to accommodate the larger antenna needed for the upgrade, on the property of its then vice president, Richard J. Wright. After the upgrade, there were few changes in the station's program offerings.

As one of the few high-powered FM radio stations in rural Northwest Ohio, the station offered a full-service format of both oldies and adult contemporary music, with high school and college sports from Heidelberg College and Tiffin University.

=== Break from Malrite ===
In the late 1970s, Wright sold his interest in Malrite to his partner. The transaction resulted in the split of WTTF-AM-FM from Malrite and operated as a separate entity under Wright's management. Wright died of lung cancer in the early 1980s.

His younger son Richard, who served as the station's engineer, ascended to the position of General Manager. Wright's other son, Robert "Bob" E. Wright, continued in his capacity as Program Director.

=== WTTF in its heyday ===
WTTF prided itself on community service and had a full contingency of live on-air personnel at a time when most stations were automating. Music was delivered almost exclusively on records and the station had an extensive record library encompassing adult contemporary, country and some rock and roll. There was a Saturday oldies programming on vinyl records supplied by the station and disc jockeys.

Prior to the FCC Telecommunications Act of 1996, which made the EAS (Emergency Alert System) the law of the land, radio stations broadcast emergency information through EBS (Emergency Broadcast System). Rather than pay full price for an expensive unit to receive EBS messages, Richard Wright built his own receiver, called the DW-76 (meaning Dick Wright and the year it was manufactured). The unit field-tested successfully, and received FCC Type Acceptance for legal use, but only for WTTF-AM-FM.

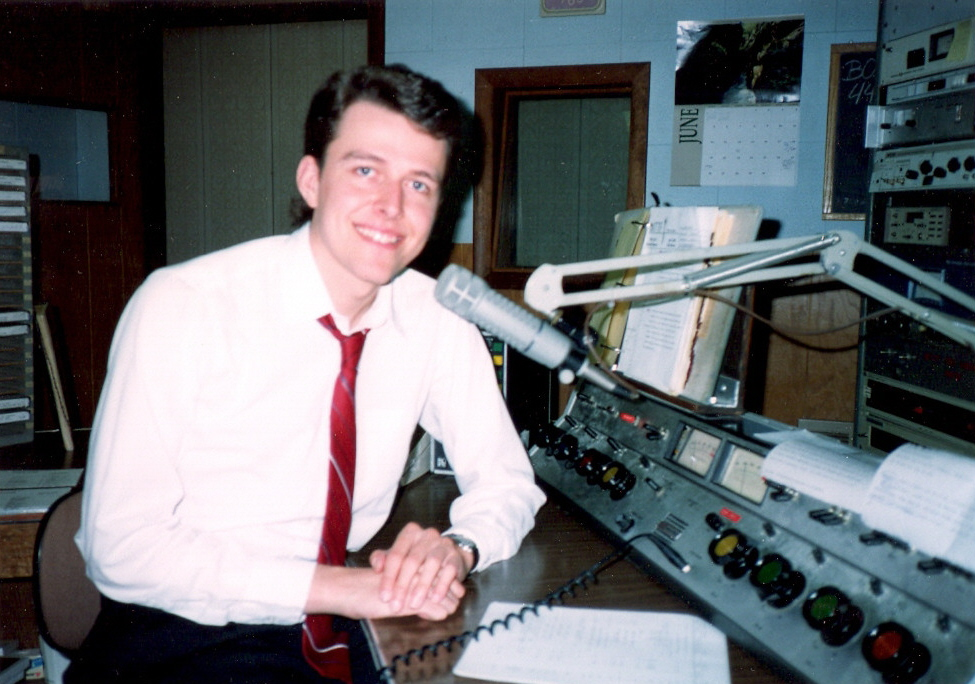
Former WTTF-AM-FM afternoon announcer Ken Hawk in 1994, taken in the main on-air studio at former 185 South Washington Street studio location. The DW-76 is seen just below microphone boom (gray panel with two switches).

Bob Wright handled morning DJ duties with two others handling the midday and evening on-air DJ shifts, as well as a news staff of two. Bob also did a daily talk and opinion show called "Sound Off" from 11 to 11:30 a.m. Under the Wright ownership, the station only broadcast about 16 hours a day.

The station had a community service and adult contemporary music format during the day. During the evenings after 6pm, the station played country music on a program called the "Double T Roundup," which lasted until the early 1980s. The AM station (1600) signed off at local sundown until 1990, after receiving nighttime broadcasting rights. The FM station (103.7) broadcast until 10 p.m. During the day, the two stations simulcast.

Among the many announcers that had peopled WTTF over the years were Jack Kagy (who served as news director for 19 years), Rick (Cochran) West (nearly eight years in the mid-day slot), Kevin Craig, Randy Dean, Ken Hawk, Andree Sterling, and Frank Barber. Many of these announcers and many others went on to larger markets for many years as WTTF provided a fertile training ground.

=== Sale, present day ===
In 1996, at the age of 56, Bob Wright was killed by a head-on collision with a pickup truck during a snowstorm. As a result, the station was sold to Jacor Communications, which was in turn acquired by Clear Channel Communications (now iHeartMedia) in 1999. After the sale of the station, former co-owner Dick Wright remained as an assistant engineer on a contract basis, up until his death January 1, 2008 .

Clear Channel initially was selling their Findlay cluster, along with other small market clusters, over to Florida-based GoodRadio.TV LLC in May 2007, but the deal soon collapsed prior to FCC approval. Clear Channel ended up spinning off WTTF, along with the Sandusky cluster and WPFX over to Fremont-based BAS Broadcasting on January 15, 2008. BAS took over WTTF on February 1, and as WCKY-FM was not included in the deal, this ended 45 years of common ownership between the two stations.

In December 2007, the Buckeye Country moniker was dropped in favor of branding with its call letters. Its city of license was also shifted to Pemberville, Ohio, to closer target Toledo.

On July 2, 2019, WCKY shifted to a traditional country format focused primarily on country hits from the 1980s and 1990s, and revived the previous Buckeye Country branding.
