= WCWA =

Sports radio station in Toledo, Ohio

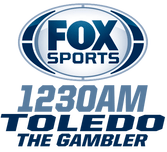
- Toledo, Ohio; United States
- Broadcast area: Toledo metropolitan area
- Frequency: 1230 kHz
- Branding: Fox Sports 1230 The Gambler

Programming
- Format: Sports gambling
- Affiliations: Fox Sports Radio; VSiN; Toledo Mud Hens; Toledo Walleye

Ownership
- Owner: iHeartMedia; (iHM Licenses, LLC)
- Sister stations: WCKY-FM, WIOT, WRVF, WSPD, WVKS

History
- First air date: April 10, 1938
- Former call signs: WTOL (1938–1965)
- Call sign meaning: "Seaway" (after the St. Lawrence Seaway)

Technical information
- Licensing authority: FCC
- Facility ID: 19627
- Class: C
- Power: 1,000 watts unlimited
- Transmitter coordinates: 41°38′13″N 83°33′52″W

Links
- Public license information: Public file; LMS
- Webcast: Listen live (via iHeartRadio)
- Website: thegamblertoledo.iheart.com

WCWA (1230 AM) is a commercial radio station in Toledo, Ohio, airing a sports radio format, concentrating on sports gambling. It is owned by iHeartMedia with studios on South Superior Street at Lafayette Street in Toledo. It carries programming from VSiN and Fox Sports Radio. Popular syndicated sports programs heard weekdays include: The Dan Patrick Show, The Herd with Colin Cowherd and The Doug Gottlieb Show.

WCWA transmits at a power of 1,000 watts. The transmitter is near the intersection of Hawley & Whittier Streets and can be easily seen from the Anthony Wayne Trail. WCWA also streams its signal on the IHeartRadio app. WCWA is part of iHeart's Toledo cluster, also including WSPD 1370 AM (NewsRadio), WVKS 92.5 FM (KISS FM), WRVF 101.5 FM (The River), WCKY-FM 103.7 FM (Buckeye Country) and WIOT 104.7 FM (Toledo's Rock).

== History ==
=== WTOL ===
WCWA is Toledo's second oldest radio station. It signed on the air on April 10, 1938, at 1200 kilocycles. It was powered at only 250 watts, using the call sign WTOL. It was founded by former Toledo prosecutor Frazier Reams (whose family owned the station all the way until 1996). Originally a daytimer, required to go off the air at night, WTOL was granted authority for around-the-clock operations in 1939. It was an affiliate of the NBC Blue Network (later to become ABC Radio).

Programming on WTOL, until the mid-1960s, was a full-service format of news, information, sports, ABC network programs and various types of music, including pop, country, jazz, and, by the early 1960s, some rock and roll. The station started broadcasting 24 hours a day in 1962 with the new format "Demand Radio 123". The tight format wore out in less than two years. In 1964 switched to a personality-driven middle of the road (MOR) sound. For many years, WTOL was a family of three broadcast stations which included WTOL-TV 11 and 104.7 WTOL-FM (now WIOT).

=== WCWA Top 40 and Country ===
The call letters were changed in 1965, when the two radio stations split from Channel 11. The call sign "WCWA," was chosen to represent the word "seaway," as a tribute to the St. Lawrence Seaway, of which Toledo is a major port. The call letters were originally assigned to a German merchant ship, the MS Karl Trautwein. The ship gave up the call sign for a modest payment.

In 1969, Station Manager Garry Miller persuaded Former WCWA disc jockey Jim Felton to leave the powerhouse regional station CKLW in Detroit and return to program WCWA as a Top 40 outlet. The new format had a more youthful sound, included PAMS jingles, while still avoiding the harder album rock and R&B songs. The playlist contained a variety of music and gained a much larger audience, topping the ratings of local news-talk outlet WSPD and leading Detroit stations 760 WJR and 800 CKLW. But as the 1970s continued, WCWA saw its ratings decline.

In the early 1980s, WCWA Manager Dan Dudley, took the station in another direction with help from consultant Jim Felton, who was working at CFTR in Toronto at the time. They mixed the pop oldies with country music crossover songs. The "Urban Cowboy" craze was in its heyday, and the format worked very well. They also brought veteran journalist Don Edwards to run the news department. Mornings were handled by John Mack Brown, a controversial host, who was counterbalanced by the impressive image of Don Edwards. DJs included Larry Fletcher, Jay Richards, Larry Weseman and Don King who hosted Sports Talk every evening. The format did well for about two years, but the "cowboy" fad faded over time.

=== Adult Standards ===
WCWA with program director Mike Sheppard, took on another format change, flipping WCWA to adult standards. It used the syndicated music format of the "Music of Your Life". It was seeing increased ratings across the country as those born in the 1940 and 50s sought out a musical sound for themselves. WCWA kept this format in both live and satellite delivered versions until 2002.

The last live version of WCWA in the standards format originated from studios at Fort Industry Square, designed by Denny Moon. The staff included Bob Martz, program director Jim Felton, Suzanne Carroll, Bill Charles, Michael Drew (Mike) Shaw, and Dennis Williams. The ratings increased with the live programming, but sales and management had trouble selling advertising on a station which catered to "old people". Most advertisers seek younger demographics.

=== Talk and Sports ===
After two decades playing nostalgia/standards, WCWA changed format to talk radio in November 2002. The station's ratings were not helped by the switch from music. The end of adult standards on 1230 also brought heated protest within the listening community, specifically from an organization known as CORRAL.

On March 1, 2021, WCWA rebranded as "Fox Sports 1230 The Gambler". The station added programming from the Vegas Stats & Information Network (VSiN), following in the footsteps of iHeart Fox Sports sister stations in Cleveland, Youngstown, and Philadelphia.

=== Play by play ===
WCWA is the flagship station for Toledo Mud Hens minor league baseball, with all regular season games, playoffs and the Triple-A All-Star Game broadcast. Jim Weber is the play-by-play voice of the Mud Hens, having called the team's games since the mid-1970s. Matt Melzak joins when home and not working his Walleye job at the same time as the Mud Hens game.

WCWA is also the flagship of the Toledo Walleye, which played its inaugural season in 2009-2010. Matt Melzak is the play-by-play announcer for the Walleye. WCWA also carries University of Toledo women's basketball, with Jim Heller calling the plays courtside.

=== Signal strength ===
Since 1969, the station engineer at WCWA and WIOT (named Chief Engineer in 1974) has been Dennis Moon. WCWA was known for having a clearer, fuller sound than most AM stations that offered music programming. This has been attributed by many who have worked there to Moon's decades-long devotion to WCWA's audio quality.

The "Moon-unit" updated WCWA to digital HD Radio (IBOC) in the summer of 2007. With just 7 watts of digital power, the station could be received in hybrid digital all the way to the Michigan border.

=== Specialty shows ===
WCWA once featured a schedule of ethnic and religious programming for most of its history. This includes programs in Polish and German as well as for the Mexican-American and Irish-American communities. Weekly shows devoted to Polka music and Urban Gospel have been featured. WCWA was also the home of several spoken-word religious shows covering different faiths. Some of these religious shows were on WCWA since its inception.

Some of these specialty programs continue on Sunday mornings, outside of the usual sports format. They include The German American Hour, Lutheran Chapel of the Air and Echoes of Ireland.
