= WFOM =

- Marietta, Georgia; United States
- Broadcast area: Atlanta metropolitan area
- Frequency: 1230 kHz
- Branding: Xtra 106.3

Programming
- Format: Conservative talk radio
- Affiliations: Fox News Radio; Premiere Networks

Ownership
- Owner: Dickey Broadcasting
- Sister stations: WCNN, WIFN

History
- First air date: 1946

Technical information
- Licensing authority: FCC
- Facility ID: 72066
- Class: C
- Power: 1,000 watts daytime/nighttime
- Transmitter coordinates: 33.92736°N 84.502158°W
- Translator: 106.3 W292EV (Marietta)

Links
- Public license information: Public file; LMS
- Webcast: Listen Live
- Website: xtra1063.com

WFOM (1230 AM, "Xtra 106.3") is an Atlanta-area radio station broadcasting on a frequency of 1230 kHz. The radio station is licensed to the city of Marietta, Georgia. WFOM, along with WCNN and WIFN, are owned by Dickey Broadcasting. The broadcast facilities are in The Battery Atlanta.

== History ==
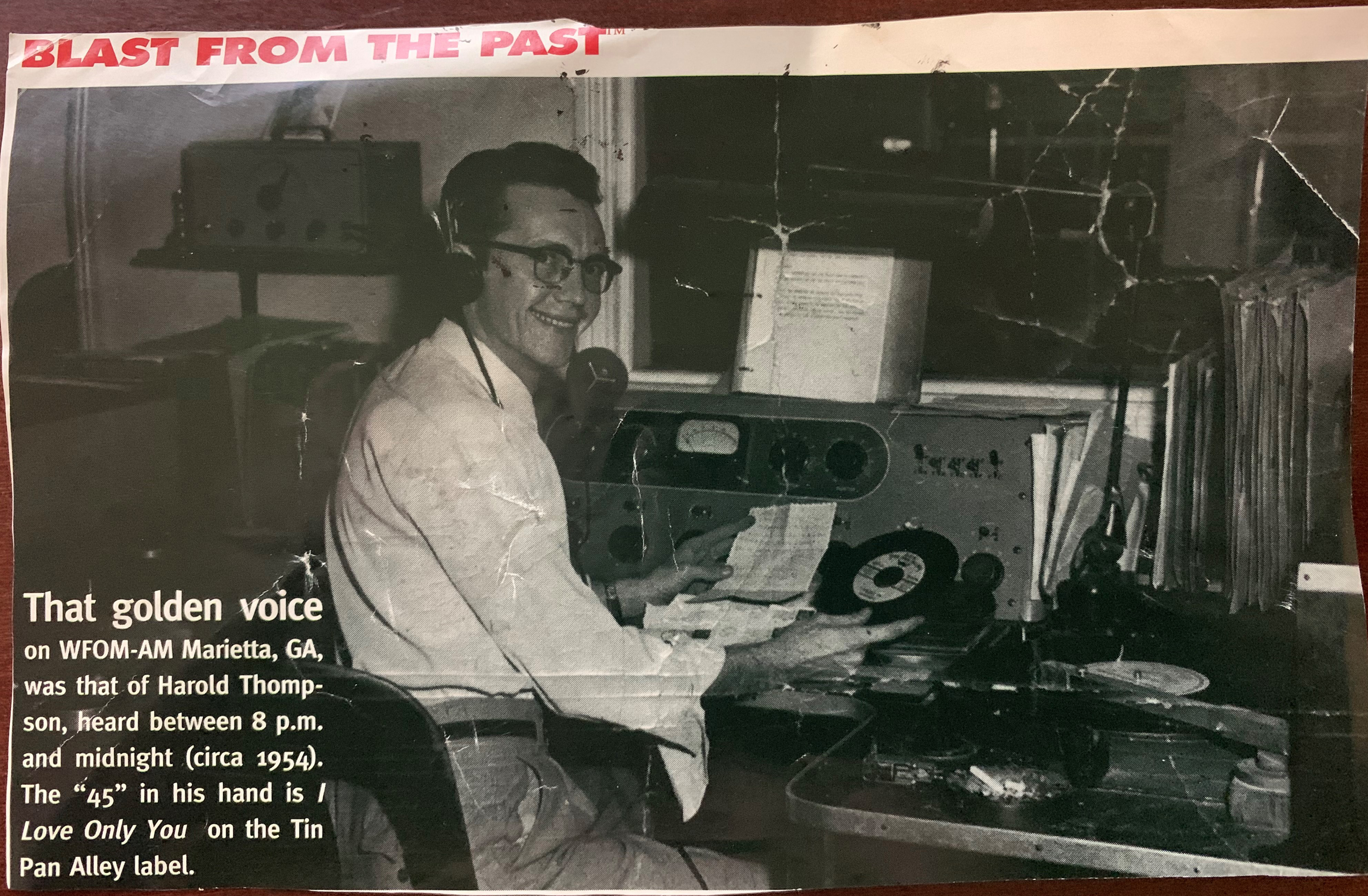
That Golden Voice on WFOM-AM Marietta, GA, was that of Harold Thompson, heard between 8 p.m. and midnight (circa 1954).

WFOM was known around Marietta, Georgia and Cobb County for its Top 40 format during the 1960s and 1970s. Despite a rather inferior signal, WFOM regularly placed within the top-five of rated Atlanta-area stations, Metro-wide. The Top 40 success of the station, which included prominence in the music industry, influenced Jerry Crowe, the radio executive co-owner in co-creating Video Concert Hall, precursor to MTV. (Crowe purchased the station from the estate of Jimmy Davenport, who was a leading rock promoter in the South throughout the 1960s and early 1970s. Among other events, the crew convinced Wolfman Jack to stop by during a visit to Atlanta, where he did one live afternoon airshift in 1973.) WFOM was known for breaking many new artists to the Atlanta-area audience over many years, including instrumental California-based surf acts, prior to the national breakout of the Beach Boys in 1963. WFOM was way ahead of its Atlanta-based competitors in adding many Soul tunes to its playlist in the mid to late 1960s, by acts such as The Chambers Brothers, Dyke & the Blazers and Johnny Nash. Also added were notable Album/Progressive rock cuts by Deep Purple, Janis Joplin, Vanilla Fudge, Jimi Hendrix and others, while the station maintained a "typical" Top 40-AM presentation style. WFOM was by far the first Metro station to air "The Ballad of John & Yoko" (1969), "Time" by The Chambers Brothers (August 1968), "Oh Well" by the pre-pop Fleetwood Mac and "No Time" by The Guess Who (both, late 1969), as well as cuts by groups such as Blondie (late-1978) and Culture Club (mid-1982). WFOM ended its somewhat unusual format in June 1983. The last song that was played in that format was Barbara Mandrell's "In Times Like These". The next morning, WFOM started playing Contemporary Christian music.

When Dickey acquired the station in the mid 1990s, the format changed to a quick information format specifically for Cobb County, Georgia. After that failed, the station became a simulcast of WCNN's sports format. In 2004, WFOM switched to a simulcast of WALR's talk format. In 2005, when WALR flipped to Spanish sports, the talk format remained on WFOM. In 2007 WALR briefly simulcast WFOM once again, only to drop the simulcast for sports as a Fox Sports Radio affiliate.

Previous logo

On August 17, 2015, ESPN Radio returned to the station from WQXI (790 The Zone). The station has since switched to a Fox Sports Radio affiliation, with parent WCNN picking up ESPN Radio.

In 2015, WFOM and WIFN became the flagship stations of Kennesaw State Owls football.

On January 4, 2018, WFOM rebranded as "The Sports X".

On April 19, 2021, WFOM changed their format from sports to news/talk. Programming featured on the station includes The Clay Travis and Buck Sexton Show. However, Braves spring training broadcasts were carried on the station on weekdays with weekend games broadcast on WCNN. It is also the Atlanta affiliate for NASCAR broadcasters Motor Racing Network and Performance Racing Network.

== Station alumni ==
Former on-air staff include Barry Chase and Scott Woodside, Jack Hurst (sports, former Atlanta Falcons announcer), Rick Ellis, Stan Mason (Kerry Fink), Harold Thompson, Dale Deason, Keith Connors (WIDE107/Y106, B98.5FM Atlanta. WSIX Nashville. WZZK Bham. Now in Tampa/St Pete MAGIC 94.9, currently 99.5QYK)), Dennis Allen (Stage), Larry Shierbecker, Connie Prichard, Tony Lype, Dain Schult, Scott Evans, Big Hugh "Baby" Jarrett, Garry Kinsey, Oscar Woodall (HayWood Media owner/GM, syndicating: "Today's Sporting News & View" radio commentary, "Woody's Weekend Winners" radio prognostications of HBCU sports and "Afro-American Sports Digest" publication), Mike Adams (Roger Kulz), Mike Durrett, Bob Middleton, Bob Owens/Bob Casey, Pete Owen, Boomer (Steve Sutton), Red Jones, Pepper Martin (sports), Jack Jackson (Jack Giesler), Pat Kelly, David Lloyd, Randy K. Riggs, Barry Brooks, John L. Callihan, Mark Shierbecker, Scott Richards (Rick Ruhl) (Now with KQLH in Los Angeles), Jon Kirby, Don Yow (Sunday Night Talk Show), Darlene Wofford, Mark McCain, Ross Brittian, Gene Lovin, John Drake, Vicki Kay, Herb Emory (air name Jason Woodside), John Long, Gary Pearcey, Bill Duncan, Rebecca Stevens, Vic Jester, Greg McClure, Chris Hiers (air name Roger Clark) and David Raye (Ray Beadles).
