= WLFN (FM) =

- Flint, Michigan; United States
- Broadcast area: Flint area
- Frequency: 88.9 MHz
- Branding: K-Love

Programming
- Format: Contemporary Christian
- Affiliations: K-Love

Ownership
- Owner: Educational Media Foundation

History
- First air date: September 1997
- Former call signs: WGRI (1997–2001); WAKL (2001–2019); WKMF (2019–2022); WKVR (2022–2024)
- Call sign meaning: Flint

Technical information
- Licensing authority: FCC
- Facility ID: 47686
- Class: A
- ERP: 380 watts
- HAAT: 80.2 meters (263 ft)
- Transmitter coordinates: 42°58′49″N 83°34′40″W

Links
- Public license information: Public file; LMS
- Website: www.klove.com

WLFN (88.9 FM) is a radio station broadcasting a contemporary Christian format. Licensed to Flint, Michigan, it is a member of the K-Love radio network. The transmitter is in Burton near the intersection of South Vassar and East Bristol roads.

== History ==
The station signed on in September 1997 as WGRI with an urban gospel format. After Gospel Radio International sold the station to the Educational Media Foundation, WGRI joined K-Love on October 1, 2001, and changed its call letters to WAKL on October 29. The station became WKMF on May 31, 2019, after EMF moved the WAKL call sign to a station it had acquired in the Atlanta market.

The station changed its call sign to WKVR on December 6, 2022, and to WLFN on October 10, 2024. The WKVR call sign was soon after recycled to a station in Columbus, Ohio, which was then being purchased by EMF, and now also simulcasts K-Love.

== Translators ==
Broadcast translators for WLFN
Call sign	Frequency	City of license	FID	FCC info
W261BH	100.1 FM	Flint, Michigan	139042	LMS
W292DA	106.3 FM	Linden, Michigan	139040	LMS
