= WCNN =

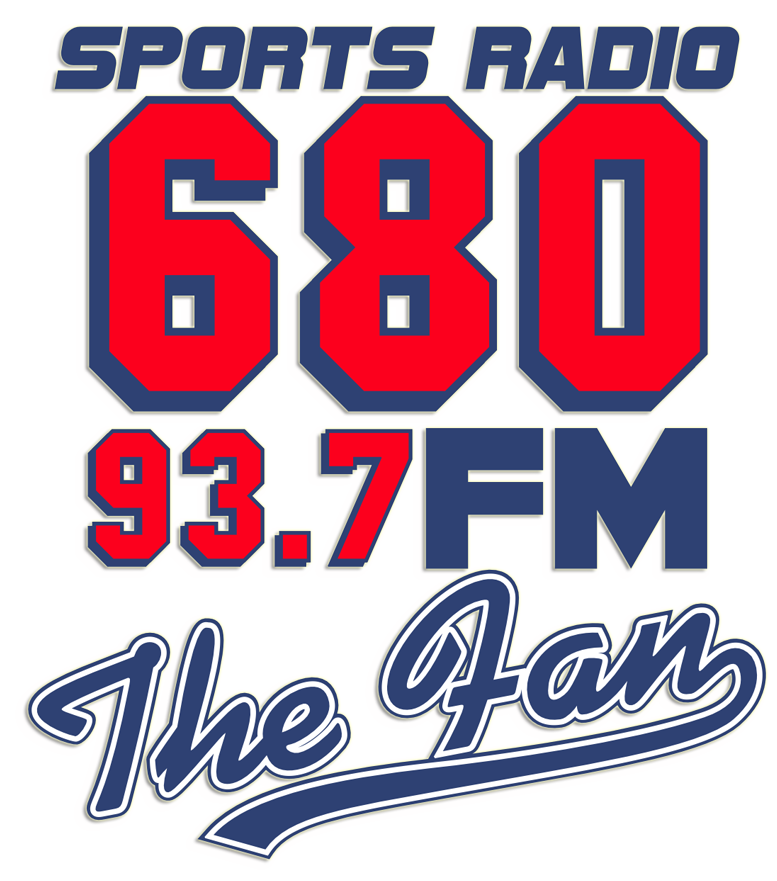
- North Atlanta, Georgia; United States
- Broadcast area: Atlanta metropolitan area
- Frequency: 680 kHz
- Branding: The Fan - 680 and 93.7 FM

Programming
- Format: Sports
- Affiliations: ESPN Radio

Ownership
- Owner: Dickey Broadcasting Company
- Sister stations: WIFN; WFOM

History
- First air date: September 1, 1965
- Former call signs: WRNG (1965–1982); WCNN (1982–1987); WGTW (1987–1988)
- Call sign meaning: Cable News Network (CNN Headline News, the former news radio format carried by the station)

Technical information
- Licensing authority: FCC
- Facility ID: 56389
- Class: B
- Power: 50,000 watts day; 10,000 watts night
- Transmitter coordinates: 33°57′42.4″N 84°15′47.7″W
- Translator: 93.7 W229AG (Atlanta)

Links
- Public license information: Public file; LMS
- Webcast: Listen live
- Website: 680thefan.com

WCNN (680 AM) is a radio station licensed to North Atlanta and serving the Atlanta-area radio market. It is owned by Dickey Broadcasting and airs a sports radio format. The station is commonly known by the on-air branding as "The Fan". Local sports shows are heard weekdays with the ESPN Radio Network airing nights and weekends. WCNN is the flagship of the Atlanta Braves Radio Network.

WCNN broadcasts with a power of 50,000 watts during the daytime, and 10,000 watts at night, using a directional antenna at all times to protect other stations on AM 680 including KNBR from San Francisco. WCNN's transmitter and towers are located near Norcross, Georgia, northeast of Atlanta. WCNN is also heard on a 250-watt FM translator, W229AG at 93.7 MHz.

The station formerly broadcast the audio portion of the CNN Headline News channel (hence its current call sign), an all-news radio format that the station pioneered in the 1980s and re-appeared on the station later in the station's history.

== History ==
On September 1, 1965, the station signed on as WRNG, Atlanta's first talk radio station. The last three letters of the call sign represented the station's branding as "Ring Radio," as in the ringing of a telephone. The station was originally a daytimer operating at 5,000 watts but having to sign-off at night. It was founded by Charles Smithgall, Jr., who began the Gainesville Daily Times in 1947. It was the first broadcast home of talk radio personality Neal Boortz, who later had a long career at WSB and syndicated nationally. Other, now well known talk radio personalities were also heard on the station, including Ronn Owens, later at KGO in San Francisco, Southern Humorist Ludlow Porch, and Barry Young, later at KFYI in Phoenix.

In 1982, Charles Smithgall III, who had recently acquired WRNG from his father, would reach an agreement with associate Ted Turner. The station's calls were changed to WCNN on August 1, 1982, and the station would become the 24-hour flagship of the fledgling CNN Radio Network, largely shedding itself of its conservative lean. By May 1985, the station had largely shifted from news back to talk radio, and by September 1986 it would become a nostalgia outfit branded as "Stardust 68".

In February 1987, the station changed its call letters to WGTW. Its call sign was a reference to Gone with the Wind, the 1939 film set in Reconstruction era-Atlanta, which was also Ted Turner's favorite film. The radio format failed to gain ratings in the market.

By November 1988, chief engineer Bob Mayben and his staff built elaborate studios in the CNN Center (formerly known as The Omni) and the WCNN calls and 24-hour local news format would return, branded as "All News 680". The CNN Headline News audio returned in June 1990, when the local all-news format failed to generate sufficient ratings. In 1995, WCNN was leased to Cox Radio for a 5-year term. The format was switched to sports radio as "680 The Fan". In 1998, the format switched to news/talk to complement WSB's programming. In 2000, when the LMA expired, control of WCNN returned to Dickey Broadcasting. The "680 The Fan" branding and the sports radio format returned to WCNN.

WCNN was the flagship station of the Atlanta Thrashers before the Thrashers moved to Winnipeg, Manitoba, Canada, and was the flagship of the Atlanta Hawks Radio Network before rival WZGC gained the rights in 2013. It has been the flagship station of the Atlanta Braves Radio Network since 2010. WCNN is also the flagship station of Georgia Tech Yellow Jackets football and men’s basketball. In 2019, the station became the flagship of Atlanta Gladiators hockey.

WCNN is now an affiliate of ESPN Radio after years of carrying CBS Sports Radio, NBC Sports Radio and Fox Sports Radio programming.

On November 30, 2010, WCNN got an FM simulcast on broadcast translator W229AG FM 93.7. In 2010, that station was actually assigned to carry WWWQ FM 99.7 HD3. It is located on Sweat Mountain, and for several years previously carried KAWZ FM, a Christian broadcasting station which feeds hundreds of translator stations from Calvary Chapel in Twin Falls, Idaho. It had Sandy Plains and now Atlanta as its community of license. 99X was reportedly set to move to this station, which had a construction permit granted in July 2010 to relocate to the same tower near North Druid Hills as WWWQ and W250BC, and has the same power but somewhat lower height (and therefore broadcast range) as 99X has on W250BC. The station was still owned by Calvary Chapel of Twin Falls, when it filed for the permit in April 2010. After being approved in early July, Calvary applied just a few days later to transfer ownership of the station to Cumulus for $400,000. It is now licensed to Cumulus Licensing LLC and resides on the WWWQ tower.

During the 2021 postseason, the Atlanta Braves Radio Network's coverage of their NLDS, NLCS and World Series appearances were carried on its online stream without geo-blocking restrictions. This has since continued into the 2022 season.
