= Mass media in Toledo, Ohio =

The following is a list of mass media in Toledo, Ohio, which includes local cable and broadcast television stations, radio stations, and newspapers which are received by people living in the Toledo, Ohio, region. Not included are radio and television stations from Detroit and Windsor, Ontario, which reach most of the city and surrounding area.

== Newspapers ==
=== Current ===
- The Blade

=== Defunct ===
- Toledo Free Press

== Cable ==
- Buckeye Broadband

== Radio ==
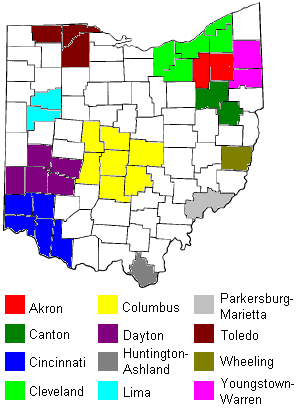
Map showing radio market areas in Ohio.

A number of radio stations are broadcast from and/or are licensed to the Toledo market, including the following:

=== AM ===
- 730 WJYM Bowling Green (Contemporary Christian)*
- 1230 WCWA Toledo (Sports)
- 1370 WSPD Toledo (Talk)
- 1520 WPAY Rossford (Relevant Radio)
- 1560 WWYC Toledo (CSN International)*

=== FM ===
Asterisk (*) indicates a non-commercial (public radio/campus/educational) broadcast.

- 88.3 WXTS-FM Toledo (Jazz)*
- 88.3 WXUT Toledo (College/alternative)*
- 88.9 WTPG Whitehouse (Contemporary Christian-WBCL)*
- 89.3 WYSZ Maumee (Christian rock/hip hop)*
- 89.7 WNOC Bowling Green (Annunciation Radio)*
- 90.3 WOTL Toledo (Family Radio)*
- 91.3 WGTE-FM Toledo (NPR/classical)*
- 92.5 WVKS Toledo (Contemporary hit radio)
- 93.5 WRQN Bowling Green (Classic hits)
- 94.5 WXKR Port Clinton (Classic rock)
- 95.7 WIMX Gibsonburg (Urban AC)
- 96.9 WNKL Wauseon (K-Love)*
- 97.3 WJZE Oak Harbor (Urban contemporary)
- 98.3 WMIM Luna Pier (Country)
- 99.9 WKKO Toledo (Country)
- 101.5 WRVF Toledo (Adult contemporary)
- 102.3 WPOS Holland Christian contemporary (Moody Radio)*
- 103.7 WCKY-FM Pemberville (Country)
- 104.7 WIOT Toledo (Mainstream rock)
- 105.5 WQQO Sylvania (Contemporary hit radio)
- 106.5 WTOD Delta (Christian)
- 107.3 WJUC Swanton (Urban AC)
- 107.7 WPFX Luckey (Country)

=== LPFM ===
- 96.5 WVZC-LP Toledo (Community/Spanish/variety)*
- 97.7 WNLB-LP Holland (Community/oldies)*
- 98.7 WTOW-LP Grand Rapids (Oldies)
- 106.1 WAKT-LP Toledo (Community)*

=== Internet Radio ===
- Sweet 419 Toledo (90s and 2K Pop)
- WSYL Sylvania (Adult Contemporary)
- River Rat Country Grand Rapids (Country)

== Television ==
=== Broadcast ===
Television stations that primarily serve Toledo, Ohio, include:

Full Power

- 11 WTOL Toledo (CBS)
- 13 WTVG Toledo (ABC, with The CW on 13.2)
- 24 WNWO-TV Toledo (NBC)
- 27 WBGU-TV Bowling Green (PBS)
- 30 WGTE-TV Toledo (PBS)
- 36 WUPW Toledo (Fox)
- 40 WLMB Toledo (Religious independent)

Low Power

- 48 WMNT-CD Toledo (MyNetworkTV)

=== Cable ===
- Buckeye Cable Sports Network
- Toledo 5 (defunct)
