= WTOD =

WTOD may refer to:

- WTOD (FM), a radio station (106.5 MHz) licensed to serve Delta, Ohio, United States
- WLQR (AM), a defunct radio station (1470 AM) formerly licensed to serve Toledo, Ohio, United States, which held the call sign WTOD in 2016
- WHSC (Hartsville, South Carolina), a defunct radio station (1450 AM) formerly licensed to serve Hartsville, South Carolina, United States, which held the call sign WTOD from 2010 to 2016
- WWYC, a radio station (1560 AM) licensed to serve Toledo, Ohio, which held the call sign WTOD from 1946 to 2010
