= WPAY (AM) =

Christian radio station in Rossford, Ohio

- Rossford, Ohio; United States
- Broadcast area: Toledo metropolitan area
- Frequency: 1520 kHz
- Branding: Relevant Radio

Programming
- Format: Catholic talk
- Network: Relevant Radio

Ownership
- Owner: Relevant Radio, Inc.

History
- First air date: November 28, 1968
- Former call signs: WTTO (1968–1973); WTUU (1973–1975); WANR (1975–1976); WGOR (1976–1981); WVOI (1981–1998); WDMN (1998–2008); WNWT (2008–2017)

Technical information
- Licensing authority: FCC
- Facility ID: 40858
- Class: B
- Power: 500 watts (day); 400 watts (night)
- Transmitter coordinates: 41°30′32″N 83°33′07″W
- Translator: 94.1 W231EF (Toledo)

Links
- Public license information: Public file; LMS
- Webcast: Listen live
- Website: relevantradio.com

WPAY (1520 kHz) is an AM radio station licensed to Rossford, Ohio, serving the Toledo metropolitan area. It is owned by Relevant Radio of Green Bay, Wisconsin. Its AM signal transmits from a five-tower inline directional antenna array at 8130 Township Highway 102 in Perrysburg, Ohio.

== History ==
=== WTTO ===
The station was established in 1966 as WTTO. It was known as "Weetow 15" with a Top 40 format to compete with WOHO and WTOD (1560 AM). It also competed with CKLW from Detroit/Windsor, Ontario. The station had its studios on the fourth floor of the Commodore Perry Hotel in Downtown Toledo. Larry Weseman "Larry Love" and Ron Sobczak "Tommy Collins" were the top air personalities. Ron Sobczak died in 2022. James K. Davis was also on air during the early days of WTTO. He later went on to become CKLW Big 8 air personality Big Jim Edwards.

=== WTUU ===
On December 3, 1973, the call sign was changed to WTUU, and the station switched to a country music format, becoming known as "Fun Country W-15-2".

=== WANR, WGOR, WVOI ===
In 1975, 1520 AM adopted an all-news radio format with the call sign WANR ("All-News Radio") featuring programming from NBC Radio's News and Information Service. The news format was unsuccessful, and the station was sold to Gore Broadcasting of Fort Lauderdale, Florida, which changed the format to gospel music and religious programming and adopted the call sign WGOR. With yet another change in ownership, the call sign was later changed to WVOI. In 1981, after WKLR dropped its R&B format in favor of country music, WVOI launched an urban contemporary music format. This format was successful and lasted until the later part of the 1990s.

=== Dominion 1520 ===
In 1998, the call sign was changed to WDMN (which stood for Dominion) when the Cornerstone Church of Maumee, Ohio, acquired the station. The station took on a gospel music format.

=== Talk radio ===
In April 2008, WDMN dropped gospel music and changed its format to talk radio. The format was a combination of progressive and conservative talk radio programming. Some traditional and smooth jazz was played on the weekends. The station was also an affiliate of CNN. On July 1, 2008, the station changed its call sign to WNWT.

=== Educational Media Foundation ownership ===
On January 22, 2009, it was announced that the Educational Media Foundation (EMF) had purchased WNWT. On April 23, 2009, WNWT's talk format was dropped, and it started airing K-Love.

On April 26, 2014, WNWT became an affiliate of Urban Family Talk. On March 15, 2017, the call sign was changed to WPAY. On March 8, 2018, Urban Family Talk was dropped in favor of Radio Nueva Vida, a Spanish-language Christian format. On September 25, 2018, the station flipped to EMF's new K-Love Classics network. On June 7, 2019, WPAY reverted to Urban Family Talk. On August 2, 2019, WPAY returned to K-Love Classics.

In November 2020, the Educational Media Foundation phased out its K-Love Classics format in favor of Christmas music. On January 1, 2021, Christmas music gave way to an all-1990s Christian music format, now known as "K-Love 90s".

=== Fusion Radio acquisition ===
On November 10, 2020, it was reported by Radioinsight.com that the Educational Media Foundation traded WPAY and two Toledo translators—W221BG (92.1 FM) and W277BI (103.3 FM) to Fusion Radio in exchange for W277AE (103.3 FM) in Madison, Wisconsin. No cash was exchanged between the two parties. The swap was consummated on July 15, 2021, and the next day, the station fell silent.

On June 12, 2022, WPAY and its translator, W221BG, returned to the air, simulcasting Delmarva Educational Association’s Christian talk and teaching format, heard on WTOD (106.5 FM).

On September 5, 2022, WPAY began playing a 2000s rhythmic heavy playlist as it prepared for a relaunch as "Party 103.3" on September 6 at 10:33 a.m., fed to W277BI. The format continued to offer 2000s rhythmic songs in addition to newer songs. The format launched with 10,000 songs in a row, with "Get Ready for This" by 2 Unlimited being the first song played. W277BI became fed by WTOD-HD2.

=== Relevant Radio ===
On October 18, 2022, it was reported by radioinsight.com that Fusion Radio had sold WPAY, along with translator W231EF (94.1 FM), to Relevant Radio, Inc. of Green Bay, Wisconsin. On October 21, 2022, WPAY went silent. Relevant began broadcasting Catholic-based religious programming on November 1, 2022. The sale, at a price of $500,000, was consummated on December 21, 2022.

== Translator ==
Broadcast translator for WPAY
Call sign	Frequency	City of license	FID	ERP (W)	Class	FCC info
W231EF	94.1 FM	Toledo, Ohio	138974	140	D	LMS
