= WLQR =

WLQR may refer to:

- WLQR (AM), a defunct radio station (1470 AM) formerly licensed to serve Toledo, Ohio, United States, which held the call sign WLQR from 1995 to 2016
- WHSC (Hartsville, South Carolina), a defunct radio station (1450 AM) which held the call sign WLQR in March 2016
- WTOD (FM), a radio station (106.5 FM) licensed to serve Delta, Ohio, which held the call sign WLQR-FM from 2009 to 2016
- WRVF, a radio station (101.5 FM) licensed to serve Toledo, Ohio, which held the call sign WLQR from 1971 to 1995
