= WXKR =

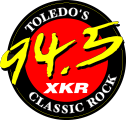
- Port Clinton, Ohio; United States
- Broadcast area: Toledo metropolitan area
- Frequency: 94.5 MHz (HD Radio)
- Branding: 94.5 XKR

Programming
- Format: Classic rock
- Subchannels: HD2: Oldies/adult standards "Glass FM"
- Affiliations: Westwood One; Cleveland Browns Radio Network

Ownership
- Owner: Cumulus Media; (Cumulus Licensing LLC)
- Sister stations: WKKO, WMIM, WQQO, WRQN, W264AK

History
- First air date: October 4, 1961
- Former call signs: WRWR (1961–1980); WOSE (1980–1990)

Technical information
- Licensing authority: FCC
- Facility ID: 69869
- Class: B
- ERP: 30,000 watts
- HAAT: 188.2 meters (617 ft)
- Transmitter coordinates: 41.501°N 83.271°W

Links
- Public license information: Public file; LMS
- Webcast: Listen live; Listen live (HD2)
- Website: wxkr.com; HD2: glassfm.com

WXKR (94.5 FM) is a radio station licensed to Port Clinton, Ohio, United States, and serving the Toledo metropolitan area. It is owned by Cumulus Media and it airs a classic rock format. The station carries Cleveland Browns football broadcasts and is known as "94.5 XKR." The studios are located in Toledo, near the University of Toledo, while the transmitter is in Elmore. WXKR broadcasts using HD Radio technology; its HD2 subchannel has a soft oldies and adult standards format as "Glass-FM."

== History ==
=== WRWR ===
The station signed on the air on January 4, 1961. Its original call sign was WRWR. The call letters stood for its founder, Robert W. Reider, a local businessperson who eventually operated WRWR, WLKR in Norwalk, WAWR in Bowling Green, and WKTN in Kenton through his "Ohio Radio Incorporated" banner. WRWR was powered at 6,700 watts, a fraction of its current output.

Reider died on March 4, 1976, but his company continued operating the station until July 31, 1979. That's when WRWR, Inc., a subsidiary of Triplett Broadcasting, took over operations.

=== WOSE/X 94.5 ===
On May 21, 1980, the station's call letters were changed to WOSE (for Ottawa, Sandusky, and Erie counties). It began playing adult contemporary music. The AC format only lasted a year.

The station increased its power in 1981, and soon changed format to country music. However, WOSE eventually flipped to Top 40 hits less than two years later, in 1983. In 1990, the call sign was switched to WXKR. It became a classic rock station known as "X-94.5". The station's transmitting power was boosted. Its tower was moved closer to Toledo, on Lemoyne Road in Northwood, across the street from Northwood High School.

=== 94.5 K-Rock ===
In March 1996, after being off the air for a couple of days, the station became "94.5 K-Rock, Rock's New Perspective." It was a surprise move to try to compete with WBUZ Buzz 106.5 Toledo. WXKR focused on an adult alternative format with artists such as Tori Amos, Pete Droge, Rusted Root, Eels, Fastball and Red Hot Chili Peppers, with 1980s retro songs sprinkled in, each introduced as a "Retro Rewind from the X-K-Archives".

The station struggled to find a niche in the market, and slowly evolved into somewhat of a mainstream modern rock format, changing its tagline to "Toledo's Modern Rock, 94.5 K-Rock". With continuing low ratings, lack of promotion, and lack of direction, the station changed ownership the next year.

=== Return to Classic Rock 94.5 XKR ===
In 1997, Cumulus Broadcasting purchased the station. WXKR stunted over the last weekend of January 1998 by playing the first five seconds of many classic rock songs followed by the sound effect of a needle dragging across a record. The classic rock format returned the following Monday, February 2, 1998.

The station's classic rock format proved to be a hit. WXKR quickly returned to the top 10 of the Arbitron ratings in Toledo. It was renamed "94.5 XKR" and has retained its format ever since, due to an upswing in the station's ratings. The classic rock format on WXKR triggered a drop in 97.3 WJZE's numbers, which forced WJZE to drop classic rock later that summer, switching to urban contemporary.

=== HD subchannel ===
WXKR once carried a sports radio format on its HD Radio digital subchannel which fed FM translator 100.7 W264AK. That translator is now fed from the HD2 subchannel of co-owned 105.5 WQQO. WXKR's subchannel later played alternative rock. It was modeled after one-time rival station WBUZ. WXKR's HD2 subchannel was then known as "The Zone."

The subchannel currently plays soft oldies and standards via Westwood One's "America's Best Music" network, calling itself "Glass-FM." Toledo has been home to the glass-making industry since the late 1800s and has Owens Corning facilities working on glass and fiberglass.
