= WWWM =

WWWM may refer to:

- WWWM-FM, a radio station (105.7 FM) licensed to serve Eden Prairie, Minnesota, United States
- WQQO, a radio station (105.5 FM) licensed to serve Sylvania, Ohio, United States, which held the call sign WWWM or WWWM-FM from 1982 to 2016
- WLQR (AM), a defunct radio station (1470 AM) formerly licensed to serve Toledo, Ohio, United States, which held the call sign WWWM from 1990 to 1995
