= W264AK =

WQQO-HD2
Digital subchannel of WQQO, Sylvania

Sylvania, Ohio; United States
- Broadcast area: Toledo metropolitan area
- Frequencies: 105.5 MHz · HD2 (HD Radio)
- Branding: 100.7 The Ticket

Programming
- Language: American English
- Format: Sports radio
- Affiliations: ESPN Radio; Ohio State Sports Network; Westwood One

Ownership
- Owner: Cumulus Media; (Cumulus Licensing LLC)
- Sister stations: WKKO, WMIM, WQQO, WRQN, WXKR

History
- First air date: W264AK: c. January 22, 1997

Technical information
- Class: n/a (WQQO: A)
- ERP: n/a (WQQO: 4,300 watts)
- HAAT: n/a (WQQO: 118.7 meters (389 ft))
- Transmitter coordinates: 41°38′49″N 83°36′18″W
- Translator: 100.7 W264AK (Toledo)

Links
- Website: www.1007theticket.com

WQQO-HD2 (105.5-2 FM) – branded 100.7 The Ticket – is a digital subchannel of Sylvania radio station WQQO (105.5 FM). Owned by Cumulus Media, WQQO-HD2 functions as a commercial sports radio station, serving the Toledo metropolitan area and much of surrounding Northwest Ohio, and also acts as the Toledo market affiliate for ESPN Radio and the Michigan Sports Network. Using the proprietary technology HD Radio for its main digital transmission, WQQO-HD2 also rebroadcasts over low-power analog Toledo translator W264AK (100.7 FM), and streams online. The WQQO-HD2 studios, and the WQQO-HD2 and W264AK transmitters, are co-located in Toledo's Scott Park neighborhood.

== History ==
=== CSN Christian Satellite Network ===
W264AK received a construction permit in March 1996, with the applicant name "Smithers Diversified Businesses, Inc." doing business as "Calvary Chapel of Twin Falls, Inc." It received its license on January 22, 1997, with the licensee "Calvary Chapel of Twin Falls, Inc." From 1997-April 2010, 100.7 was a fulltime repeater of KAWZ of Twin Falls, Idaho. It carried programming from Christian Satellite Network.

=== The Zone ===
On December 10, 2009, the Calvary Chapel of Twin Falls applied to the Federal Communications Commission to transfer the license for the translator to Cumulus Media. In return, CSN acquired WTOD (1560 AM) from Cumulus Broadcasting; no money was exchanged between the two parties. Following the deal's consummation, W264AK was reassigned to rebroadcast WXKR's HD2 digital subchannel and changed frequencies to 100.9 MHz—accordingly with the serially assigned W265CB call sign—and adopted a modern rock format as "100.9 The Zone"; the format itself had previously been carried on the former "106.5 The Zone" WRWK (106.5 FM). Following numerous interference complaints from listeners to WRIF, which operates on the first-adjacent signal of 101.1 MHz in Detroit, W265CB was reassigned back to 100.7 MHz on July 29, 2010; WXKR's branding accordingly changed to "100.7 The Zone" and the translator call sign reverted to W264AK.

=== 100.7 The Vibe/Return of The Zone ===
After a few days of stunting. Cumulus changed WXKR-HD2's format to Top 40/CHR as "100.7 The Vibe" on May 5, 2011, again with W264AK as the analog relay; the modern rock format was transferred to a newly launched HD3 subchannel. This format lasted until March 19, 2012, when the modern rock format was transferred back to WXKR-HD2 and W264AK again as "100.7 The Zone" amid a series of format and personnel changes, including the moving of The Andrew Z Morning Show from "The Vibe" over to WWWM (105.5 FM); WXKR-HD3 was also discontinued. By 2014, the program source for W264AK was transferred from WXKR-HD2 to WWWM-HD2.

=== Talk Radio 100.7 ===
Following Cumulus' closure of WLQR (1470 AM) on September 24, 2016, WQQO-HD2 assumed WLQR's talk radio format that September 28, branded "Talk Radio 100.7"; the move was necessitated following issues at WLQR's transmitter site, of which the repairs were cost-prohibitive.

=== The Zone Returns Again ===
WQQO-HD2 switched formats from talk radio back to modern rock on November 1, 2019, again branded as "100.7 The Zone", with morning drive hosted by WQQO evening personality Chris "Peapod" Daher and Westwood One's Rock 2.0 service accounting for all other hours. This format change also resulted in the fourth overall incarnation of "The Zone" branding in the Toledo market.

=== 100.7 The Ticket ===
On May 1, 2021, W264AK began relaying WQQO-HD2, and changed their format to sports as "The Ticket", which was formerly heard on WTOD from June 2009 until April 30, 2021. The Zone's alternative rock format relocated to WXKR-HD2. The Ticket's programming is mainly from ESPN Radio.

=== FM Translator ===
Broadcast translator for WQQO-HD2
Call sign	Frequency	City of license	FID	ERP (W)	HAAT	Class	Transmitter coordinates	FCC info
W264AK	100.7 FM	Toledo, Ohio	81369	82	108.1 m (355 ft)	D	41°38′49″N 83°36′18″W	LMS
