= WLKR =

WKLR can refer to:

- WLKR (AM), a radio station (1510 AM) located in Norwalk, Ohio, United States
- WLKR-FM, a radio station (95.3 FM) located in Norwalk, Ohio, United States
