= WLQR (AM) =

Radio station in Toledo, Ohio, United States (1954–2016)

- Toledo, Ohio; United States
- Broadcast area: Toledo Metropolitan Area
- Frequency: 1470 kHz

Ownership
- Owner: Cumulus Media

History
- First air date: October 1954
- Last air date: September 30, 2016
- Former call signs: WOHO (1954–1990); WWWM (1990–1995); WLQR (1995–2016); WTOD (2016); WLQR (2016)
- Call sign meaning: Previously used on the former WLQR (101.5 FM)

Technical information
- Facility ID: 65958
- Class: B
- Power: 1,000 watts
- Transmitter coordinates: 41°37′54.2″N 83°28′37.8″W

WLQR was a commercial radio station licensed to Toledo, Ohio, United States, and broadcast at 1470 AM from 1954 to 2016. The station broadcast with a power output of 1,000 watts. It had a different signal pattern during the day than it did at night, using a directional antenna. The transmitter and four towers were located on Pickle Road, east of Toledo, in Oregon, Ohio. The studios at the transmitter site are no longer in use, since the WLQR/WTOD studios have been moved to the Cumulus Toledo-Cluster facility in South Toledo.

The station shut down when its license was turned in to the Federal Communications Commission for cancellation by owner Cumulus Media, due to the transmitter site in Oregon needing extensive repairs. The talk radio format offered on the station upon closure was subsequently transferred to a digital subchannel of co-owned WQQO.

== History ==
The station first signed on the air in October 1954 as WOHO, owned by the Lew Dickey family, who later controlled the Cumulus Broadcasting Company; therefore, AM 1470 was their very first station. For many years WOHO was a leading "Rockabilly" music station in Toledo from the 1950s under the auspices of Program Director "Johnny Dauro" and owner Sam Sloan.

In 1962 Johnny and most of the staff were let go, including George Mishler who went to WMGS in Bowling Green as Program Director. Mishler in 1964 went to the Voice of America in Washington, D.C., ultimately to become a manager of the Special English programming where he retired in 1984. Bob Martz, the program director for WTOD 1560, an "early 5,000-watt rock station", was hired and he immediately replaced the "Rockabilly" jocks with "Rock & Roll" jocks. During the Top 40 years, the disc jockeys were known as the "WOHO Good Guys". Music-era D.J.s included: Tommy Dean, Swingin Sweeney, Gary Calvert, Peter Tripp, John Garry, Larry Obrien, Bob Martz, Sam Holman, Rick Randall, Bob B. Rich, E. Alvin Davis, Program Director Don Armstrong (late 1960s-early 1970s), Bill Manders, Bob Kelley (Norman Plumer), Larry Love (Larry Weseman), Ben Gall, Russ Simpson, Buddy (Fred Malnofski) Carr, Earl (Sharninghouse) Richards, Tommy Vance (Thomas Gray), Norm Davis, Ken R. Deutch, Sir Bernard J. Quayle, Paul Stowers, Mike Cook, Mike Morin, Chris "Beau" Elliot, Ron Sobczak, Johnny Zion, Steve (Matt Zaleski) Matthews, Jeff McCarthy, Corey Deitz, and Jay Scott, News Director Craig (Hugh Ledoux) Edwards, and Ed Corey (early 1980s). News staffers included Cheryl Deutsch, Scott Feldman, Lou Hebert, Irwin Young, Hank Neyer, Ken (Robey) Roberts, Larry Jewett, Shannon Bauer, and Matt Zaleski (news & traffic reporter). There was also the inimitable Gear Jammin, Double Clutchin', Cookie Crunchin', Curb Jumpin' "MOJO MAN" aka Sid D. Grubbs. Air personality Johnny Williams (Tom DeAngelo) spent time on the WOHO airwaves prior to his long run on CKLW The Big 8 Windsor/Detroit in the 1970s & 80s.

Russ Simpson, a Canadian, became the host of "Royale Windfall" on CHAN-TV in Vancouver; he died in 2004. Buddy Carr (who later became the original owner of WRED is the only former "Good Guy" still on the air in Toledo. WOHO was also a longtime affiliate of Casey Kasem's American Top 40. Craig Edwards retired in 2008 as Program Director of KRLA in Los Angeles.

In the late 1960s, WOHO was the home to a nightly talk show called "Rap". It aired 7p.m.-5a.m. Monday through Friday. The show continued into the early 1980s. Over the years the hosts included Andy Douglas (former Toledo City Councilman), Harold Salverda, Ken R. Deutch, Bob Nixon, Larry Dessner, Karen Sue Martinsen, Saint Giffo and Carty Finkbeiner who was elected three times as Toledo mayor.

The Pickle Road studios were shared with sister station WXEZ/105.5 FM, ("Z-105" during the 1970s and 1980s, and later WWWM-FM Star 105–5). In the 1980s, the station was the home of Toledo Goaldiggers (IHL) hockey broadcasts.

WOHO evolved from Top 40 into an adult contemporary station by 1983, and remained so through the rest of the 1980s. The station changed its call sign to WWWM in 1990; it was briefly a country music station, before switching to urban adult contemporary music as an affiliate of Satellite Music Network's The Touch (radio network) (now part of Cumulus Media). The station switched to sports radio as WLQR in November 1995.

From 1971 to 1995, WLQR was also the call sign of an Easy Listening (later Adult Contemporary music) station on 101.5 MHz in Toledo (now WRVF 101.5, "The River"). The station was the flagship station for Toledo Mud Hens minor league baseball team from 2003 to 2007, but the team announced in October 2007 that it would move to Clear Channel-owned WCWA.

On June 22, 2009, the modern rock format of "106.5 The Zone" WRWK, suffering from declining ratings, was dropped in favor of a full-time simulcast of the then-WLQR and the new call sign of WLQR-FM. "The Zone" programming moved to the HD-2 side channel of sister station WXKR and later also to a low-powered translator station of WXKR-HD2, broadcasting on 100.7 MHz. However, WXKR-HD2 and its translator later switched to a contemporary hit radio format as "The Vibe"; "Zone" programming is available only on WXKR-HD3.

On August 9, 2012, it was announced that AM 1470 would drop its sports format (which would still be carried on WLQR-FM) to become a talk station, featuring such nationally syndicated personalities from Cumulus Media subsidiary Westwood One: Don Imus, Jonathan Brandmeier, Chris Plante, Dave Ramsey, Michael Savage, Mark Levin, John Batchelor and Red Eye Radio. It was the Toledo affiliate for the Detroit Lions, Detroit Pistons, Detroit Red Wings, Detroit Tigers and the Ohio State Sports Network. The station also broadcast high-school football games.

=== Closure ===
Due to aging towers and a failing ground system, the transmitter power of WTOD/WLQR was reduced to approximately 330 watts from its licensed 1,000 watt allocation. WTOD operated via a series of Special Temporary Authorizations beginning in August 2003. The ground system at its transmitter site, on land owned by Cumulus' former CEO Lew Dickey and EVP John Dickey and leased to Cumulus, required repair and/or replacement, and the station had multiple never-built Construction Permits to construct a replacement four tower array on the west side of Toledo.

On March 11, 2016, WLQR changed its call letters to WTOD, picking up the call sign formerly used with the current WWYC. Cumulus had effectively "parked" the call sign on a Hartsville, South Carolina AM station after trading the 1560 kHz license to CSN International in exchange for FM translator W264AK at 100.7 MHz.

On September 24, 2016, Cumulus announced that WTOD would shut down operations that night, its format moved to W264AK/WQQO-HD2, and the call sign relocated to the current WTOD. The station simply went dark at midnight with no official sign-off or any mention of its 60 years on the air.

On September 29, 2016, WTOD changed the call sign back to WLQR. Cumulus surrendered WLQR's license to the Federal Communications Commission (FCC) the next day. Market manager Andy Stuart told the Toledo Blade, "The cost to fix it, and what the expected return is not a good investment. We decided the best thing is to turn [the license] back, and maybe someone else will want to operate it." The FCC cancelled the license on November 30, 2016. By not selling the station's license, but instead "turning-in" the license to the FCC, Cumulus prevented anyone else from operating a station on 1470 kHz in Toledo, and the 1470 allocation is forever lost. The Dickey Brothers sold the towers, transmitters and building to the City of Oregon, Ohio.

WTOD's broadcasts of Bowling Green Falcons football and basketball moved to 100.7, while broadcasts of Michigan Wolverines football and basketball relocated to WMIM. Undetermined and unannounced at the station's closure was the fate of the Detroit Tigers broadcast rights for the market; 106.5 has generally been prohibited from broadcasting Tigers games due to the station's close proximity to Archbold-based affiliate WMTR-FM. As of 2022, there exists no Detroit Tigers Baseball transmissions from any Toledo-based radio stations.
