= WTWR =

WTWR may refer to:

- the former call sign of WMIM (98.3 MHz), a country music FM radio station licensed to Luna Pier, Michigan
- the former call sign of WMXD (92.3 FM Mix 92.3), an urban adult contemporary radio station in Detroit, Michigan
