= WNKL =

Wauseon, Ohio; United States
- Broadcast area: Toledo, Ohio
- Frequency: 96.9 MHz
- Branding: K-LOVE

Programming
- Format: Religious
- Affiliations: K-LOVE

Ownership
- Owner: Educational Media Foundation

History
- Former call signs: WXQQ (2003–2004)
- Call sign meaning: WauseoN K-LOVE

Technical information
- Licensing authority: FCC
- Facility ID: 78441
- Class: A
- ERP: WNKL: 5,000 watts
- HAAT: 109 metres (358 ft)
- Transmitter coordinates: 41°36′03″N 83°54′27″W

Links
- Public license information: Public file; LMS

WNKL (96.9 FM) is a radio station licensed to Wauseon, Ohio serving the Toledo area, airing the K-LOVE Contemporary Christian format, and owned by the K-Love Inc. (formerly the Educational Media Foundation).

== History ==
The 96.9 FM frequency went on the air in April 2003 with the calls WXQQ and a "stunting" format of songs from movie soundtracks. After two months of stunting, the station debuted a dance-based rhythmic CHR format as "Q96-9", which featured dance hits, dance remixes of pop hits, and some hip-hop as well. The station was almost automated at first, running without DJs or commercials. Later the station added a few commercials and even started DJs during prime listening hours. The station is perhaps best known for its weekly live mix shows usually heard on Friday and Saturday. The mixes featured 3 resident DJs: Adubb, Jesse Dorr, and Symmetry. "Q96-9" touted itself as "The Only Station That Mixes Live in the 419", referring to the 419 area code in which the Toledo metro falls within. The format choice surprised many listeners who had been, given the station's ownership by the Cornerstone Church, who also operated sister station WDMN 1520 AM (now WPAY), expecting some kind of religious format from the start on 96.9.

"Q96-9" did, in fact, not last long despite making some minor inroads into the Toledo Arbitron ratings, and in 2004, the dance format was dropped and the station returned to the "stunt" format of movie themes. The calls were changed to WNKL, and once the stunting was over, 96.9 FM emerged as northwestern Ohio's "K-LOVE" affiliate. As of January 22, 2009 WNKL, along with WNWT (now WPAY), have been purchased by the Educational Media Foundation.

== Coverage ==
WNKL broadcasts with 5,000 watts of power from a tower located northwest of Swanton, Ohio. The station's primary coverage area includes portions of Fulton, Lucas and Henry counties in Ohio as well as Lenawee and Monroe counties in Michigan, though the station can be heard on a good radio as far north as Saline, Michigan, and as far south as Ottawa, Ohio.

== Translators ==
Call sign	Frequency	City of license	FID	ERP (W)	Class	FCC info
W290BA	105.9 FM	Bowling Green, Ohio	138967	55	D	LMS
W281AL	104.1 FM	Harbor View, Ohio	138989	19	D	LMS
