= WAKT =

WAKT may refer to:

- Tanah Merah Airport in Tanahmerah, Indonesia
- Wake Island Time Zone, WAKT
- WAKT-LP, a local low-power FM radio station (106.1 FM) licensed to serve Toledo, Ohio, United States
- WKNK, a radio station (103.5 FM) licensed to Callaway, Florida, United States, formerly known as WAKT-FM from 2004 until 2012
