= WRQN =

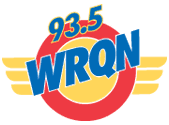
- Bowling Green, Ohio; United States
- Broadcast area: Toledo metropolitan area
- Frequency: 93.5 MHz
- Branding: 93.5 WRQN

Programming
- Format: Classic hits

Ownership
- Owner: Cumulus Media; (Cumulus Licensing LLC)
- Sister stations: WKKO, WMIM, WQQO, WXKR, W264AK

History
- First air date: June 3, 1964
- Former call signs: WAWR (1964–1976); WKIQ (1976–1983)
- Call sign meaning: Rockin'

Technical information
- Licensing authority: FCC
- Facility ID: 22676
- Class: B1
- ERP: 7,000 watts
- HAAT: 121 meters (397 ft)
- Transmitter coordinates: 41.458°N 83.659°W

Links
- Public license information: Public file; LMS
- Webcast: Listen live
- Website: www.935wrqn.com

WRQN (93.5 FM) is a commercial radio station licensed to Bowling Green, Ohio, United States, and serving the Toledo metropolitan area. It is owned by Cumulus Media and it airs a classic hits format. The studios are located on Arlington Avenue in Toledo.

The transmitter is off Middletown Pike (Ohio State Route 582) in Haskins, Ohio.

== History ==
=== WAWR ===
The station signed on the air on June 3, 1964. The original call sign was WAWR and the station was powered at 3,000 watts, less than half its current output. It was owned by Portage Valley Broadcasting, founded by Port Clinton resident Robert W. Reider. Reider later started and operated WRWR in Port Clinton, WLKR in Norwalk, and WKTN in Kenton, all via his "Ohio Radio Incorporated" banner.

WAWR programmed easy listening music during the day and progressive rock in the evenings. The station later changed to contemporary album rock (AOR) in the evenings with Bob Ladd, geared toward the college students at local Bowling Green State University. Earl Sharninghouse (aka Rick Allen) hosted an oldies weekend show playing 1950s and 1960s hits on Saturday and Sunday evenings in the mid-1960s. Steve Wright held the morning slot with Terry Waltz anchoring the news and news director. Jim (Marick) Obrien worked part-time in production and occasional on air talent. General Manager Jerry (Tschappit) McCullen conducted local talks shows at local restaurants.

=== WRQN ===
Eventually, the call sign was changed to WKIQ, lasting several years. When it became WRQN on July 11, 1983, the station began as a mix of AOR and Top 40. It used the slogan "Toledo's New Rock, The All-New 93 and a 1/2 FM WRQN." It played artists like Robert Plant, The Police, Culture Club and Billy Squier. The station later called itself "Hit Rock, Hit Radio, 93Q". Despite its weaker 3,000-watt signal, the station became quite successful competing with then 50,000-watt 92.5 WMHE.

WRQN's on-air lineup included (Steve) Mason, Diane and The Q Morning Zoo, Brad Hanson, Joe Thomas, Ted Kelly, and Scott Greggory. Eventually, former intern turned local personality favorite Johny D was heard in the evenings, hosting a show called "Dial D". Most of the time was spent taking phone calls from listeners and rapping about anything the listeners wanted to talk about.

Around 1990 the station boosted the transmitting power to 6,000 watts. It also aired syndicated programs like "Future Hits", "Casey's Top 40" and "Saturday Night Hot Mix". The station also had its own specialty program that aired on Sunday nights called "93Q's on the Edge" that played alternative rock that had not yet reached the mainstream.

=== Switch to oldies ===
On October 17, 1991, "The Q Morning Zoo" did not air. Instead WRQN began stunting by playing "Louie Louie" by The Kingsmen over and over. The station called itself "Louie 93.5, All Louie, All the Time!". The station also played a marching band rendition of the song during this stunting. On the following Monday, Mason and Diane returned to host the Q Morning Zoo. They discussed the change to oldies. There was a sizable backlash from some listeners, many of them signing petitions demanding the return of 93Q.

Mason talked about this but said that those listeners were "fighting for a lost cause", and that the station was not changing back. It turned out the morning show would not be around much longer either. Mason and Diane left after several months. For a majority of the 1990s, the station was known as "WRQN Oldies 93.5", focusing on hits from the 1950s and 1960s.

=== Segue to classic hits ===
In 1997, WRQN was acquired by Cumulus Media. The new ownership took steps to update the station's sound. By 2000, WRQN began adding some 1970s classic hits and Motown favorites. It also removed the 1950s doo wop hits from the playlist and began gradually deleting some 1960s gold.

The year 2006 saw even more changes at WRQN. The transmitter power was increased to 7,000 watts, a new tower was built, and the station was the first in the Toledo market to broadcast using HD Radio technology. Toledo radio veteran Bob Kelly (who joined the station after the switch to oldies) was inducted into the Ohio Radio Hall of Fame in October 2006.

The lineup at the time on WRQN featured long-time Toledo radio professionals Jim Brady, Ron Finn, Buddy Carr, as well as Bob Kelly with his new partner Becky Shock (replacing Bob's sidekick of 19 years, Dennis Staples).

On Friday, June 10, 2011, longtime radio host Bob Kelly retired, as did the morning show "Bob and Becky". The following Monday, June 13, 2011, a new morning show was introduced, "Ron and Lyn", formerly the wake-up hosts on WWWM-FM. Ron Finn previously hosted the 10a-2p shift on WRQN which former morning show personality, Becky Shock hosted for sometime. Finn's counterpart in the morning, Lyn Casye still aired on Star 105.5's new morning show, "Tim and Jeff" offering news, weather, and traffic updates.

Then on Monday, June 13, 2011, WRQN slightly updated its programming. WRQN began using the slogan "Feel Good Favorites". It removed most 1960s gold from the playlist and added 1980s hits. Artists heard frequently include Elton John, Billy Joel, George Michael, Prince, Whitney Houston, Michael Jackson, Heart and Madonna.
