= WJUC =

Coordinates: 41.642°N 83.901°W

- Swanton, Ohio; United States
- Broadcast area: Toledo, Ohio
- Frequency: 107.3 MHz
- Branding: "The Juice 107.3"

Programming
- Format: Urban contemporary

Ownership
- Owner: Fleming Street Communications, Inc.

History
- First air date: 1997
- Call sign meaning: "Juice"

Technical information
- Licensing authority: FCC
- Facility ID: 71442
- Class: A
- ERP: 3,000 watts
- HAAT: 100 meters (330 ft)

Links
- Public license information: Public file; LMS
- Website: http://www.thejuice1073.com/

WJUC (107.3 FM "The Juice") is a commercial urban contemporary music radio station in Swanton, Ohio, broadcasting to the Toledo area. The station's studios are located in Toledo, and its transmitter is located north of Swanton. WJUC is the Toledo area affiliate of The Chubb Rock Show, Tisha Lee in the Midday, The Jeff Foxx Show, and Love and R&B With Al B. Sure!.

WJUC, which began broadcasting in 1997, was the first African-American owned-and-operated radio station in the Toledo market and is one of the few radio stations in the area that is still locally owned and operated. "The Juice" began as a station playing a wide variety of musical styles appealing to African-American listeners, including rap, soul oldies, gospel music, and blues. Today, the station's playlist consists almost exclusively of R&B and urban contemporary hits, aside from a Sunday-morning gospel music program. Connecting to Community and Hometown Live are part of the Saturday Morning Juice, a community engagement show that consists of interviews and community topics.

WJUC is the brainchild of Charles "Charlie Chuck" Welch, a former disc jockey at the now-defunct WKLR-FM (now WKKO).

WJUC primarily competes with Urban Radio Broadcasting's WIMX (Mix 95.7) for the ears of urban AC listeners in Toledo. The Juice's ratings have fallen in recent years due to competition, which is now usually the higher-rated (12+) of the two stations. WJUC also suffers from a signal that becomes scratchy in the eastern portion of the Toledo metro area and under certain weather conditions is sometimes swamped by co-channel interference from WNWV in Elyria, Ohio, although the station continues to enjoy respectable ratings despite its limited reach. This is due to the station’s reputation as the “hometown” station that engages the community.

The most recent endeavor of WJUC is a partnership with aMAYSing Kids Broadcasting and Media Mentorship Program, a 501(c)3 reading literacy program created by longtime WJUC radio personality Tisha Lee-Mays and husband Dante Mays. The program works to improve reading through teaching broadcasting fundamentals.

Effective May 25, 2017, Welch Communications assigned the license for WJUC to Fleming Street Communications, Inc., a corporation controlled by Charles Welch's children. Welch’s daughter, Debra Hogan serves as President of Fleming Street Communications.

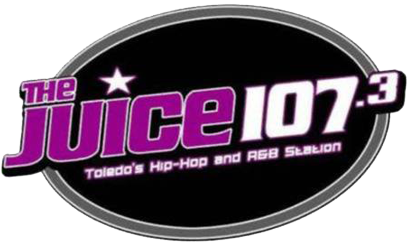
Logo under previous slogan
