= WHSC =

WHSC may refer to:

- WHSC (Hartsville, South Carolina), a defunct radio station (1450 AM) formerly licensed to serve Hartsville, South Carolina, which held the call sign WHSC from 1946 to 2010
- WAYS (AM), a radio station (1050 AM) licensed to serve Conway, South Carolina, United States, which held the call sign WHSC from 2010 to 2017
- WBZF, a radio station (98.5 FM) licensed to serve Hartsville, South Carolina, which held the call sign WHSC-FM from 1992 to 1999
- White House Signal Corps
