= Kouh =

District in South Papua, Indonesia

- District
- Location of the district in South Papua Location of the district in Western New Guinea
- Coordinates: 5°48′22.176″S 140°12′40.1832″E
- Country: Indonesia
- Province: South Papua
- Regency: Boven Digoel

Area
  - Total: 467.25 km^{2} (180.41 sq mi)

Population (2020)
  - Total: 1,093
  - Density: 2.339/km^{2} (6.059/sq mi)
- Time zone: UTC+09:00 (EIT)
- Postal code: 99655
- Regional code: 93.02.04

Kouh is a district in Boven Digoel Regency, South Papua Province, Indonesia. The district covers an area of 467.25 km2, and had a population of 1,093 at the 2020 Census.
