= North Baltimore, Ohio =

- Village
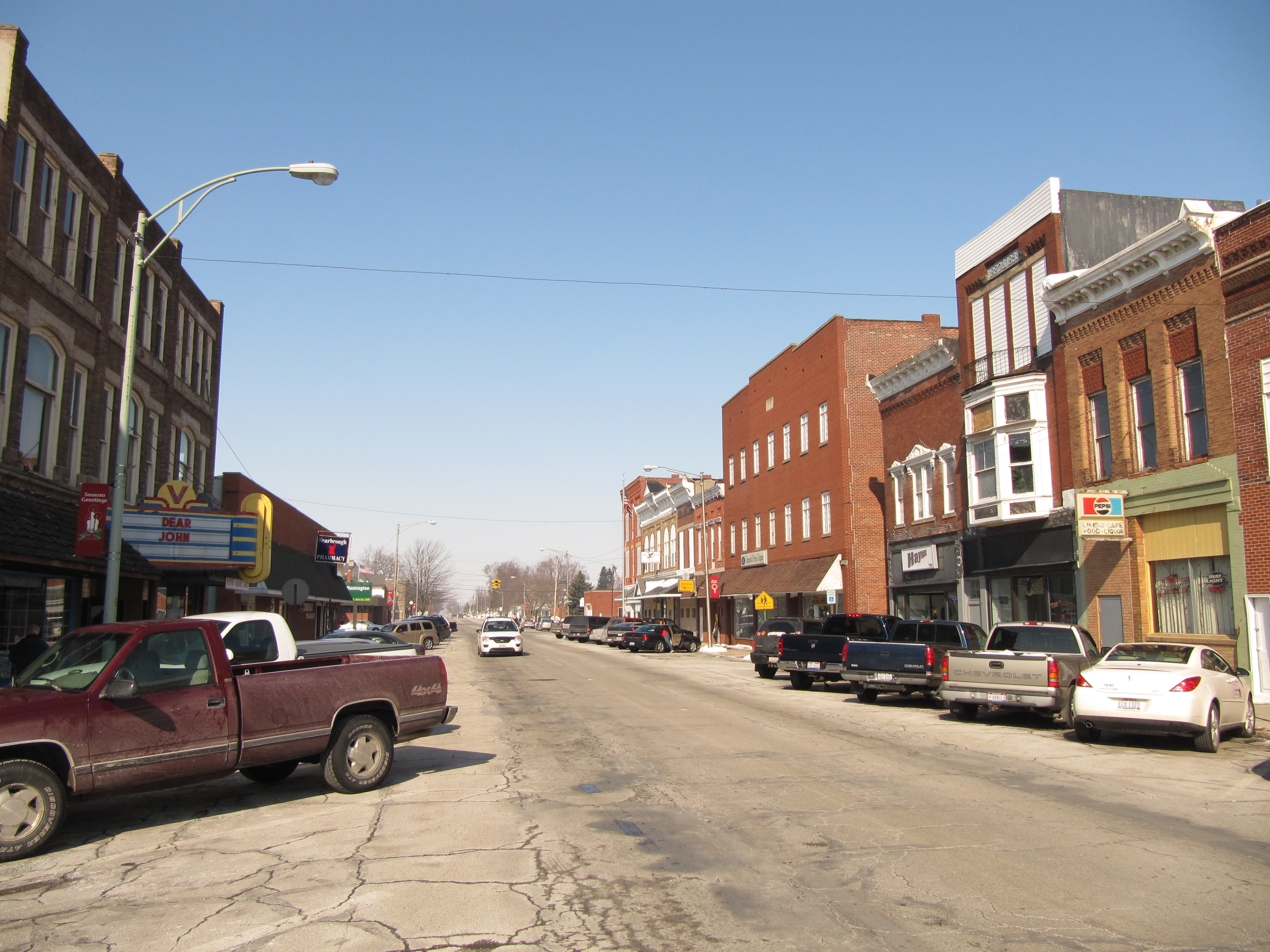
- North Main Street in North Baltimore, Ohio
- Motto: Crossroads of the Heartland
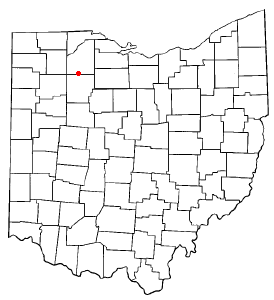
- Location of North Baltimore, Ohio

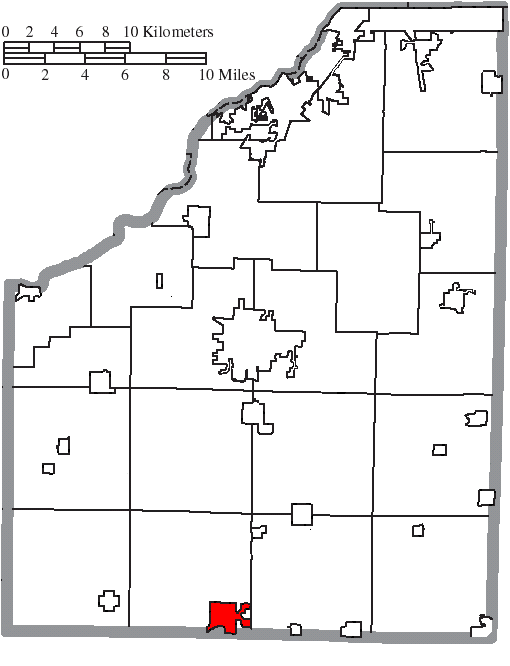
- Location of North Baltimore in Wood County
- Coordinates: 41°10′49″N 83°40′10″W
- Country: United States
- State: Ohio
- County: Wood
- Township: Henry

Area
  - Village: 2.55 sq mi (6.60 km^{2})
  - Land: 2.52 sq mi (6.53 km^{2})
  - Water: 0.027 sq mi (0.07 km^{2})
- Elevation: 725 ft (221 m)

Population (2020)
  - Village: 3,369
  - Density: 1,337.1/sq mi (516.27/km^{2})
  - Metro: 651,429
- Time zone: UTC-5 (Eastern (EST))
  - Summer (DST): UTC-4 (EDT)
- ZIP code: 45872
- Area codes: 419, 567
- FIPS code: 39-56154
- GNIS feature ID: 2399509
- Website: https://www.northbaltimore.gov/

North Baltimore is a village in Wood County, Ohio, United States and is part of the Toledo, OH Metropolitan Statistical Area. The population was 3,369 at the 2020 census. The village is a member of the Toledo Metropolitan Area Council of Governments.

== History ==
North Baltimore was platted in 1874 when the Baltimore and Ohio Railroad was extended to that point. A post office called North Baltimore has been in operation since 1874. The village was incorporated in 1876.

In September 26, 1986, an industrial incident in North Baltimore led to fumes hospitalizing 89 people.

== Geography ==
According to the United States Census Bureau, the village has a total area of 2.50 square miles (6.47 km^{2}), of which 2.47 square miles (6.40 km^{2}) is land and 0.03 square miles (0.08 km^{2}) is water.

Interstate 75 and Ohio State Route 18 meet at the village, while it is about three miles south of Ohio State Route 25 and 26 miles south of Interstate 80/Interstate 90 (Ohio Turnpike).

North Baltimore is about 12 miles (19 km) south of Bowling Green, 8 miles (13 km) north of Findlay, and about halfway between Lima and Toledo. North Baltimore is also linked to Bowling Green via a 13-mile bike route called the Slippery Elm Trail, with East Broadway Street in North Baltimore on the south end and Sand Ridge Road in Bowling Green on the north end.

Ironically, North Baltimore is not adjacent to Baltimore, Ohio, a village in Fairfield County approximately 25 miles east of Columbus. North Baltimore and Baltimore are actually approximately 140 miles from each other.

North Baltimore is part of the Toledo, OH Metropolitan Statistical Area and lies within the Toledo Media Market.

== Demographics ==
Historical population
Census	Pop.	Note	%±
1880	701		—
1890	2,857		307.6%
1900	3,561		24.6%
1910	2,503		−29.7%
1920	2,439		−2.6%
1930	2,402		−1.5%
1940	2,616		8.9%
1950	2,771		5.9%
1960	3,011		8.7%
1970	3,143		4.4%
1980	3,127		−0.5%
1990	3,139		0.4%
2000	3,361		7.1%
2010	3,432		2.1%
2020	3,369		−1.8%

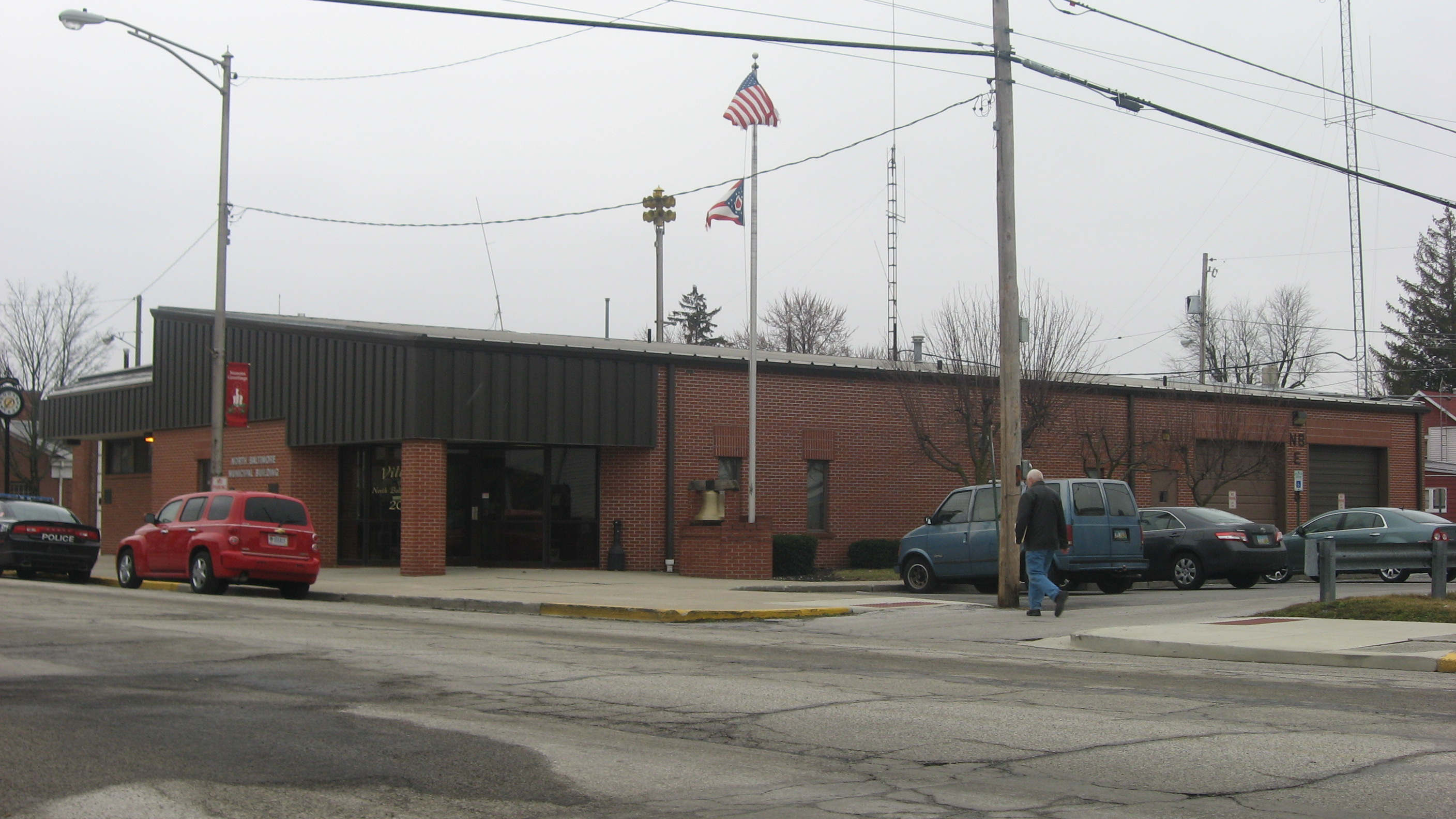
North Baltimore Town Hall

=== 2020 census ===
As of the 2020 census, North Baltimore had a population of 3,369. The median age was 38.0 years. 25.1% of residents were under the age of 18 and 15.7% of residents were 65 years of age or older. For every 100 females there were 93.4 males, and for every 100 females age 18 and over there were 87.5 males age 18 and over.

0.0% of residents lived in urban areas, while 100.0% lived in rural areas.

There were 1,355 households in North Baltimore, of which 30.8% had children under the age of 18 living in them. Of all households, 42.7% were married-couple households, 17.0% were households with a male householder and no spouse or partner present, and 29.8% were households with a female householder and no spouse or partner present. About 29.4% of all households were made up of individuals and 13.0% had someone living alone who was 65 years of age or older.

There were 1,451 housing units, of which 6.6% were vacant. The homeowner vacancy rate was 1.6% and the rental vacancy rate was 2.7%.

Racial composition as of the 2020 census
Race	Number	Percent
White	3,059	90.8%
Black or African American	18	0.5%
American Indian and Alaska Native	20	0.6%
Asian	4	0.1%
Native Hawaiian and Other Pacific Islander	0	0.0%
Some other race	63	1.9%
Two or more races	205	6.1%
Hispanic or Latino (of any race)	256	7.6%

=== 2010 census ===
As of the census of 2010, there were 3,432 people, 1,317 households, and 880 families living in the village. The population density was 1,389.5 inhabitants per square mile (536.5/km^{2}). There were 1,468 housing units at an average density of 594.3 per square mile (229.5/km^{2}). The racial makeup of the village was 96.3% White, 0.6% African American, 0.2% Native American, 0.4% Asian, 1.2% from other races, and 1.3% from two or more races. Hispanic or Latino of any race were 4.8% of the population.

There were 1,317 households, of which 37.2% had children under the age of 18 living with them, 46.5% were married couples living together, 13.9% had a female householder with no husband present, 6.5% had a male householder with no wife present, and 33.2% were non-families. 27.4% of all households were made up of individuals, and 12.4% had someone living alone who was 65 years of age or older. The average household size was 2.56 and the average family size was 3.09.

The median age in the village was 36.4 years. 26.9% of residents were under the age of 18; 9.1% were between the ages of 18 and 24; 26% were from 25 to 44; 24.2% were from 45 to 64; and 13.9% were 65 years of age or older. The gender makeup of the village was 48.8% male and 51.2% female.

=== 2000 census ===
As of the census of 2000, there were 3,361 people, 1,272 households, and 886 families living in the village. The population density was 1,512.2 inhabitants per square mile (583.9/km^{2}). There were 1,360 housing units at an average density of 611.9 per square mile (236.3/km^{2}). The racial makeup of the village was 96.82% White, 0.36% Native American, 0.39% Asian, 1.13% from other races, and 1.31% from two or more races. Hispanic or Latino of any race were 3.33% of the population.

There were 1,272 households, out of which 36.0% had children under the age of 18 living with them, 50.9% were married couples living together, 14.2% had a female householder with no husband present, and 30.3% were non-families. 25.3% of all households were made up of individuals, and 12.7% had someone living alone who was 65 years of age or older. The average household size was 2.57 and the average family size was 3.07.

In the village, the population was spread out, with 28.2% under the age of 18, 8.8% from 18 to 24, 28.1% from 25 to 44, 19.7% from 45 to 64, and 15.2% who were 65 years of age or older. The median age was 34 years. For every 100 females there were 91.0 males. For every 100 females age 18 and over, there were 86.0 males.

The median income for a household in the village was $38,507, and the median income for a family was $45,962. Males had a median income of $33,144 versus $23,022 for females. The per capita income for the village was $16,894. About 6.9% of families and 8.8% of the population were below the poverty line, including 10.5% of those under age 18 and 11.8% of those age 65 or over.

== Education ==
It is in the North Baltimore Local School District.

== Notable people ==
- Russell Coffey, once the oldest living American veteran of World War I
- Gene Sharp, political science professor, nominated for the Nobel Peace Prize
