= WKFM =

Country radio station in Huron, Ohio

- Huron, Ohio; United States
- Broadcast area: Sandusky–Port Clinton; Lake Erie Islands
- Frequency: 96.1 MHz
- Branding: Your Country K-96

Programming
- Language: English
- Format: Country
- Affiliations: Motor Racing Network; Performance Racing Network; Premiere Networks; Westwood One

Ownership
- Owner: Elyria-Lorain Broadcasting Company
- Sister stations: WLKR; WLKR-FM

History
- First air date: April 1, 1996
- Call sign meaning: "K-96 on the FM dial"

Technical information
- Licensing authority: FCC
- Facility ID: 39170
- Class: A
- Power: 3,400 watts
- HAAT: 133 meters (436 ft)
- Transmitter coordinates: 41.301°N 82.488°W

Links
- Public license information: Public file; LMS
- Webcast: Listen live
- Website: www.wkfm.com

WKFM (96.1 FM) is a radio station licensed to Huron, Ohio and serves the Sandusky–Port Clinton–Lake Erie Islands (Vacationland) region. Its transmitter is in Berlin Heights and its studios are in Milan, along with sister stations WLKR-FM and WLKR (AM). The station is locally owned by Elyria-Lorain Broadcasting Co., and features a country music format positioned on-air as "K-96". Programming is a combination of local hosts and Westwood One's Mainstream Country satellite format.

WKFM went on the air April 1, 1996. At first it was only carried a satellite-fed signal from Westwood One's satellite country channel.

The station currently features the syndicated Big D and Bubba in the morning and Mike Lilje in the afternoon drive time. It also broadcasts local high school football and NASCAR programming.
