= WPFX-FM =

- Luckey, Ohio; United States
- Broadcast area: Toledo, Ohio
- Frequency: 107.7 MHz (HD Radio)
- Branding: 107.7 The Wolf

Programming
- Format: Country

Ownership
- Owner: Patton Advertizing Enterprises, LLP

History
- First air date: June 1, 1989
- Former call signs: WIZD (1988–1989); WMHQ (1989–1999); WIMJ (1999–2002)
- Call sign meaning: WP FoX (previous format)

Technical information
- Licensing authority: FCC
- Facility ID: 7821
- Class: A
- ERP: 5,200 watts
- HAAT: 107 meters (351 ft)
- Transmitter coordinates: 41°25′39.00″N 83°36′30.00″W

Links
- Public license information: Public file; LMS
- Webcast: Listen Live
- Website: 1077wolf.com

WPFX-FM (107.7 MHz, "The Wolf") is an American radio station, licensed to Luckey, Ohio. WPFX-FM is owned and operated by Patton Advertizing Enterprises, LLP, with an effective radiated power of 5,200 watts. The station's studios are located in downtown Toledo, and its transmitter is located in Bowling Green, Ohio.

== History ==
107.7 first filed for a construction permit in March 1988, and initially assigned the call letters WIZD. However, these call letters were not used and the station went on the air June 1, 1989 as "Jumpin' Country 107.7" WHMQ, though licensed to North Baltimore, maintained its studios and offices along Tiffin Avenue in Findlay.

From 1999 to 2002, the callsign was changed to WIMJ and was known as Magic 107.7 with an Oldies format.

In 2002, Clear Channel changed the callsign to WPFX-FM and the format was also changed to classic rock as 107.7 The Fox to better target then rival Classic Hits 100.5 WKXA in Findlay.

In July 2008, WPFX-FM changed its format from classic rock as 107.7 The Fox to Adult contemporary as My 107.7 just before going off the air in August 2008. Then "The Fox" marker and format was moved over to WBUK 106.3 after Clear Channel sold its Findlay cluster of stations to Blanchard River Broadcasting Company.

In August 2008, Clear Channel the owners of the license failed to transfer the lease for the studio facilities to the new owners, as a result, the FCC has granted a temporary "Stay Silent" order which gives the owners up to 6 months to acquire an appropriate facility and resume broadcasting. WPFX FM 107.7 ended up staying silent until October 2010.

In February 2010, a construction permit was granted to new owner Toledo Radio LLC to move its city of license from North Baltimore to Luckey and its transmitter to a new site (shared with WNOC and WTPG just one mile north of Bowling Green, making WPFX-FM a Toledo market station. Test transmissions began during the week of October 1, 2010.

On October 8, 2010, after being off the air for a little over two years, WPFX-FM moved its city of license from North Baltimore to Luckey and came on the air as 107.7 The Wolf and started going up against Toledo's longtime heritage country music station K-100.
