= WLKR-FM =

Radio station in Norwalk, Ohio

- Norwalk, Ohio; United States
- Broadcast area: Sandusky; Port Clinton; Lake Erie Islands
- Frequency: 95.3 MHz
- Branding: 95.3 WLKR

Programming
- Language: American English
- Format: adult album alternative
- Affiliations: AP Radio News

Ownership
- Owner: Elyria-Lorain Broadcasting Co.
- Sister stations: WKFM; WLKR

History
- First air date: September 17, 1962
- Call sign meaning: co-founder Ed Walker

Technical information
- Licensing authority: FCC
- Facility ID: 21486
- Class: A
- ERP: 3,300 watts
- HAAT: 91 meters (299 ft)
- Transmitter coordinates: 41°16′49.00″N 82°39′26.00″W

Links
- Public license information: Public file; LMS
- Webcast: Listen live
- Website: wlkrradio.com

WLKR-FM (95.3 FM) is a commercial radio station licensed to Norwalk, Ohio, owned by the Elyria-Lorain Broadcasting Co. The station features an adult album alternative format. WLKR-FM serves the Vacationland area, and is the local affiliate of the Cleveland Guardians Radio Network and the Ohio State Sports Network. It also airs coverage of local high school sports, including football, volleyball, basketball, wrestling, softball and baseball.

The WLKR-FM studios are located in Milan, while the station's transmitter is located near the intersection of Huber Road and Lamereaux Road just outside of Norwalk. In addition to a standard analog transmission, WLKR-FM is also available online.

== History ==
WLKR-FM started broadcasting in 1962, with the AM counterpart, WLKR (AM), starting in 1968. The station was founded by Port Clinton, Ohio resident Robert W. Reider, who eventually started and operated WLKR-AM-FM, WRWR in Port Clinton, WAWR in Bowling Green, and WKTN in Kenton, all via his "Ohio Radio Incorporated" banner. For many years, the station held a full service adult contemporary format, and was an ABC News Radio affiliate, covering Paul Harvey News and Comment among other long-form news features.

In September 1979, WLKR AM and FM were sold over to Firelands Broadcasting, headed first by longtime station general manager James Westerhold, and later David Mehling. Both stations were then sold to the Elyria, Ohio-based Elyria-Lorain Broadcasting Co. in February 2002. WLKR has since maintained its local presence, while the music programming was first streamlined into a traditional adult contemporary. It assumed an adult album alternative format in March 2007.

WLKR-FM also supplies newscasts to sister stations WLKR and WKFM; Josh Bowman was hired as WLKR-FM's News and Sports Director in late May 2016.

== Programming ==
WLKR's current weekday lineup features the morning show with Melissa and Chris Morgan, Kelly Rose mid-days, Carrie Danger in afternoons and Martin Davis in evenings. Newscasts are handled by News and Sports Director Josh Bowman. WLKR-FM also serves as the local affiliate for AP Radio News.
