= WPOS-FM =

Holland, Ohio; United States
- Broadcast area: Toledo metropolitan area
- Frequency: 102.3 MHz (HD Radio)
- Branding: 102.3 Proclaim FM

Programming
- Format: Contemporary Christian
- Affiliations: Moody Radio; Salem Radio Network

Ownership
- Owner: The Maumee Valley Broadcasting Association

History
- First air date: September 1, 1966
- Call sign meaning: "We Proclaim Our Savior"

Technical information
- Licensing authority: FCC
- Facility ID: 65946
- Class: A
- ERP: 6,000 watts
- HAAT: 95 meters (312 ft)
- Transmitter coordinates: 41°37′32″N 83°42′41″W

Links
- Public license information: Public file; LMS
- Website: proclaimfm.com

WPOS-FM (102.3 FM) is a commercial radio station licensed to Holland, Ohio, United States, and serving the Toledo metropolitan area with a Contemporary Christian music format. WPOS-FM is owned by The Maumee Valley Broadcasting Association, a non-profit 501(c)3 organization. The station is 75 percent listener supported, with the other 25 percent coming in through advertising.

The radio studios and transmitter are located at 7112 Angola Road in Holland.

== History ==
WPOS-FM began broadcasting on September 9, 1966. Originally it was powered at 3,000 watts and aired a mix of Christian hymns along with talk and teaching shows.

The Maumee Valley Broadcasting Association acquired the construction permit in 1965 before the station was on the air. Its studios and transmitter have always been located on Angola Road in Holland. It has kept the same call sign through its history.

== Programming ==
Most of the day, WPOS-FM airs Contemporary Christian music. Talk and teaching shows are heard in early mornings and evenings.
