= Boven-Digoel =

Boven-Digoel may refer to:

- Boven Digoel Regency
- Boven-Digoel concentration camp
