= WKKO =

Country music radio station in Toledo, Ohio

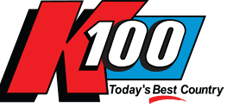
- Toledo, Ohio; United States
- Broadcast area: Toledo Metropolitan Area
- Frequency: 99.9 MHz
- Branding: K100

Programming
- Format: Country
- Affiliations: Compass Media Networks; Westwood One

Ownership
- Owner: Cumulus Media; (Cumulus Licensing LLC)
- Sister stations: WRQN; WMIM; WQQO (HD2); WXKR

History
- First air date: December 7, 1946
- Former call signs: WTOD-FM (1946–1947, 1957–1958); WTRT (1947–1957, 1958–1967); WKLR (1967–1968); WKLR-FM (1968–1986)

Technical information
- Licensing authority: FCC
- Facility ID: 22673
- Class: B
- ERP: 50,000 watts
- HAAT: 152.4 meters (500 ft)
- Transmitter coordinates: 41.668°N 83.453°W

Links
- Public license information: Public file; LMS
- Webcast: Listen live; Listen live (via iHeartRadio)
- Website: k100country.com

WKKO (99.9 FM) is a commercial radio station in Toledo, Ohio with a country music format. It is owned by Cumulus Media. The station's studios are located in Toledo, and its transmitter is located in Harbor View, Ohio.

== History ==
Toledo AM radio station WTOD began FM broadcasting on 97.7 MHz as WTOD-FM on December 7, 1946. Four months later, it became WTRT. The call sign stood for "Tomorrow's Radio Today".

During the summer of 1981, WKLR ("Kooler Radio"), a longtime R&B/soul and later disco music station, changed to its current country format known as K100. Joe Hill (now retired OM/SM) of WHME/WHRI/WHRA/KWHR/KFLR was the first announcer when WKLR went from 8,000 watts to 50,000 watts in the summer of 1982. After the power up, the station was heard in Detroit. In 1986, the call letters were changed from WKLR-FM to WKKO. The station was owned by Booth American of Detroit for some 30 years, then Fritz Broadcasting (also from Detroit) beginning in 1994. It was then sold to its current owner, Cumulus Broadcasting, in 1997.

In 1992, WTOD 1560 AM began a full-time simulcast of K-100 after a short-lived simulcast of WRED's country format. This lasted until 2004, when WTOD dropped K-100 for a talk radio format.

WKKO has consistently been not only a market leader in the Toledo area, but its share of the market ranks among the highest nationwide. Longtime morning duo Mitch and Mary Beth left WKKO for WRVF (101.5) in 2000 and were replaced by WKKO Program Director Gary Shores and Assistant Program Director Harvey J. Steele, together known as Shores & Steele. The two had previously done afternoons for some six years, and were named Broadcast Personalities for medium markets by the Country Music Association.

As of 2021, the station's lineup consists of the local Lyn & Cliff Morning Show, Toledo radio veteran Johny D on middays, and Mark “Mookie” Andrews on afternoon drive. Evening slot is filled in with the syndicated program Nights With Elania. WKKO's competitors include its own sister station WMIM "Nash Icon" 98.3, as well as rival WPFX 107.7 and classic country-formatted WCKY-FM 103.7.
