= WQQO =

Top 40 radio station in Sylvania, Ohio

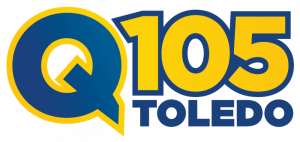
- Sylvania, Ohio; United States
- Broadcast area: Toledo metropolitan area; Northwest Ohio
- Frequency: 105.5 MHz (HD Radio)
- Branding: Q105

Programming
- Format: Hot adult contemporary
- Subchannels: HD2: Sports "100.7 The Ticket"
- Affiliations: Westwood One

Ownership
- Owner: Cumulus Media; (Cumulus Licensing LLC)
- Sister stations: WKKO; WRQN; WMIM; WXKR

History
- First air date: November 29, 1968
- Former call signs: WGLN (1968–1972); WXEZ (1972–1982); WWWM (1982–1990); WWWM-FM (1990–2016)

Technical information
- Licensing authority: FCC
- Facility ID: 42127
- Class: A
- ERP: 4,300 watts
- HAAT: 118.7 meters (389 ft)
- Transmitter coordinates: 41.647°N 83.605°W
- Translator: HD2: 100.7 W264AK (Toledo)

Links
- Public license information: Public file; LMS
- Webcast: Listen live; Listen live (via iHeartRadio)
- Website: www.q1055.com

WQQO (105.5 FM) is a commercial radio station licensed to Sylvania, Ohio, carrying a hot adult contemporary format known as "Q105". Owned by Cumulus Media, the station serves the Toledo metropolitan area and much of surrounding Northwest Ohio. WQQO's studio is located near UTMC on Arlington near Byrne road. The transmitter is located in Toledo's Scott Park neighborhood. Besides a standard analog transmission, WQQO broadcasts over two HD Radio channels, and is available online; WQQO-HD2 carries a sports talk format branded as "ESPN 100.7 The Ticket", which is relayed over low-power analog translator W264AK.

== History ==
The 105.5 MHz spot on the radio dial in the Toledo area began in November 1968 as WGLN, located in a cornfield in western Lucas County, the remote studio-transmitter location was the home of the "Jones Boys", a concept introduced in Toledo by station manager and native Toledoan Michael Drew Shaw. Like WTRX in Flint, Michigan where Shaw had been program director several years before being named manager at WGLN, every DJ used the last name Jones. Among the more notable, Davy Jones, Casey Jones, Tom Jones, and John Paul Jones. More notable D.J.s sporting the name JONES were Joe Hood, Steve Wright, Earl Sharninghouse, and Klaus Helfers, The station featured country music - the first such FM station in the market - and broadcast live performances.

After a few months, WGLN became as "Golden 105," featuring a primarily oldies playlist with a sprinkling of current hits introduced with the tagline "Here today, Golden tomorrow." Then in late 1971, the format shifted to progressive rock. It was Toledo's first so-called underground FM station playing the songs and deep album cuts that no one else in the market was playing at the time. The station, however, was later sold in 1972 to Midwestern Broadcasting and by spring of that year, 105.5 FM became a beautiful music station with the WXEZ call sign. In response to the format change, a citizens' group known as the Citizens' Committee to Keep Progressive Rock filed an objection with the FCC on the basis that Toledo already had several other middle-of-the-road/easy listening-type format stations and did not need another; the FCC rejected the appeal, and the committee continued to appeal the rejection until the Reams family changed WCWA-FM (104.7) to WIOT in December 1972, after which the objection was withdrawn.

At this time, 105.5 FM was still located in its tiny studio in the rural cornfield setting at its transmitter site in Berkey, Ohio. It later was moved into the newly remodeled garage at the Pickle Road studios of WOHO. By the late 1970s it had transformed into an automated Top 40/rock format called "Z-Rock" (no relation to the heavy-metal music format of the same name) station known as "Z-105".

During both 1979 and 1980, the station had a simulcast of sister station WOHO 1470 AM for morning drive time as well as for weekend broadcasts of American Top 40 (AT40 would later move to WMHE following its Top 40 launch in 1984). In 1980, the station went on its own with live local on-air talent. The FM feed began playing Album-oriented Rock (AOR). As the format changed from rock to adult contemporary in September 1982, the branding changed from "105 WXEZ Rocks" to "3WM 105 FM". This move was due to poor ratings and failing to compete against other AOR station WIOT. After dumping the WXEZ calls (to a Chicago station) they obtained WWWM-FM (from a Cleveland station who went by "M105"), hence the "3WM".

Their AM sister station on 1470, WOHO, then also changed their calls to WWWM from 1990 until 1995. The format was urban contemporary music at the time. The Toledo duopoly of 1470AM/105.5FM has always been owned by the Lew Dickey family, first as Midwestern Broadcasting, then as Cumulus Broadcasting/Media.

The station re-branded as "Star 105" in 1998, changing format from adult contemporary to hot adult contemporary. In April 2007, Star 105.5 became Toledo's home for Delilah's syndicated love-songs program, which competes with the John Tesh show on Clear Channel's WRVF. WWWM had previously aired Delilah for a time during the late 1990s. At the same time, the station became known as "Star 105.5" rather than simply "Star 105" and modified its playlist in a more mainstream AC direction, adding more music from the 1970s. However, after Star 105.5 dropped Delilah, and in 2008 replaced her with the Billy Bush show, the station returned to hot AC and pre-1980s music was dropped. In April 2008, WWWM-FM began continuous HD Radio digital radio broadcasts.

WWWM was re-branded as "Star 105" on March 19, 2012, concurrent with a format switch to contemporary hit radio; "Andrew Z in the Morning" was picked up for morning drive at this time, but dropped from the lineup that December. In September 2014, Denny Schaffer returned to the Toledo market to host morning drive on WWWM.

Previous logo

On the morning of April 1, 2016, WWWM re-branded as "Channel 105.5", completing its shift back to Hot AC. By that June 22, WWWM re-branded as "Q105.5" under new WQQO calls; the WWWM call sign was subsequently parked on a co-owned Eden Prairie, Minnesota station.

On September 4, 2020, at 3 p.m., WQQO dropped the hot adult contemporary format and began stunting with popular 1990s and 2000s hip hop and pop hits, while announcing a change to come at 5 a.m. on September 8. In addition, the station dropped the "Q105.5" branding. At the promised time, WQQO shifted back to CHR as "Q105".

On September 1, 2023, ahead of the Labor Day weekend, WQQO shifted to a hot adult contemporary format leaning towards 1990s and 2000s music, though retaining the "Q" brand and a small amount of more current and recurrents, mirroring similar format shifts at Top 40 outlets across the country in the previous year.

== WQQO-HD2 ==
WQQO airs a sports talk format on its HD2 subchannel, branded as "ESPN 100.7 The Ticket" (simulcast on translator W264AK 100.7 FM).
