= WLKR (AM) =

Radio station in Norwalk, Ohio

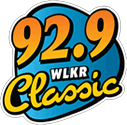
- Norwalk, Ohio; United States
- Broadcast area: Sandusky; Port Clinton; Lake Erie Islands
- Frequency: 1510 kHz
- Branding: 92.9 WLKR Classic

Programming
- Language: American English
- Format: classic hits
- Affiliations: AP News; Westwood One; Indianapolis Motor Speedway Radio Network

Ownership
- Owner: Elyria-Lorain Broadcasting Co.
- Sister stations: WKFM; WLKR-FM

History
- First air date: March 18, 1968
- Former call signs: WLKR (1968–1991); WVAC (1991–2003)
- Call sign meaning: co-founder Ed Walker

Technical information
- Licensing authority: FCC
- Facility ID: 21487
- Class: D
- Power: 500 watts (daytime only)
- Transmitter coordinates: 41°16′49″N 82°39′26″W
- Translator: 92.9 W225DG (Norwalk)

Links
- Public license information: Public file; LMS
- Webcast: Listen live
- Website: wlkrclassic.com

WLKR (1510 AM) is a radio station licensed to Norwalk, Ohio, owned by Elyria-Lorain Broadcasting Co. The station only broadcasts during daytime hours, and features a classic hits format as "92.9 WLKR Classic". WLKR serves the Vacationland area.

WLKR's studios are located in Milan, while the station's transmitter is located near the intersection of Huber Road and Lamereaux Road just outside of Norwalk. In addition to a standard analog transmission, WLKR simulcasts over low-power analog Norwalk translator W225DG (92.9 FM), and is also available online.

== History ==
WLKR first signed on the air on March 18, 1968, as the AM adjunct to WLKR-FM, which had begun broadcasting four years earlier. The AM station became WVAC on January 28, 1991 (for the "Vacationland"), and switched back to WLKR on May 30, 2002.

WLKR carried Westwood One's adult standards format known as "America's Best Music" until December 2004, when it switched to oldies music from Westwood One's "Oldies Channel" format. WLKR switched to sports talk in August 2006, programmed exclusively with ESPN Radio as "ESPN 1510 WLKR".

WLKR's current classic hits format was adopted in late August 2010 as "Kool Gold 1510 WLKR," taking its branding from former syndicator Dial Global's Kool Gold format (now known as Westwood One's classic hits format). After adding an FM translator in August 2019, the station was re-branded as "92.9 WLKR Classic."

== FM translator ==
Broadcast translator for WLKR
Call sign	Frequency	City of license	FID	ERP (W)	HAAT	Class	Transmitter coordinates	FCC info
W225DG	92.9 FM	Norwalk, Ohio	202493	240	121 m (397 ft)	D	41°16′49″N 82°39′26″W	LMS
