= WAKT-LP =

Nonprofit community radio station in Toledo, Ohio

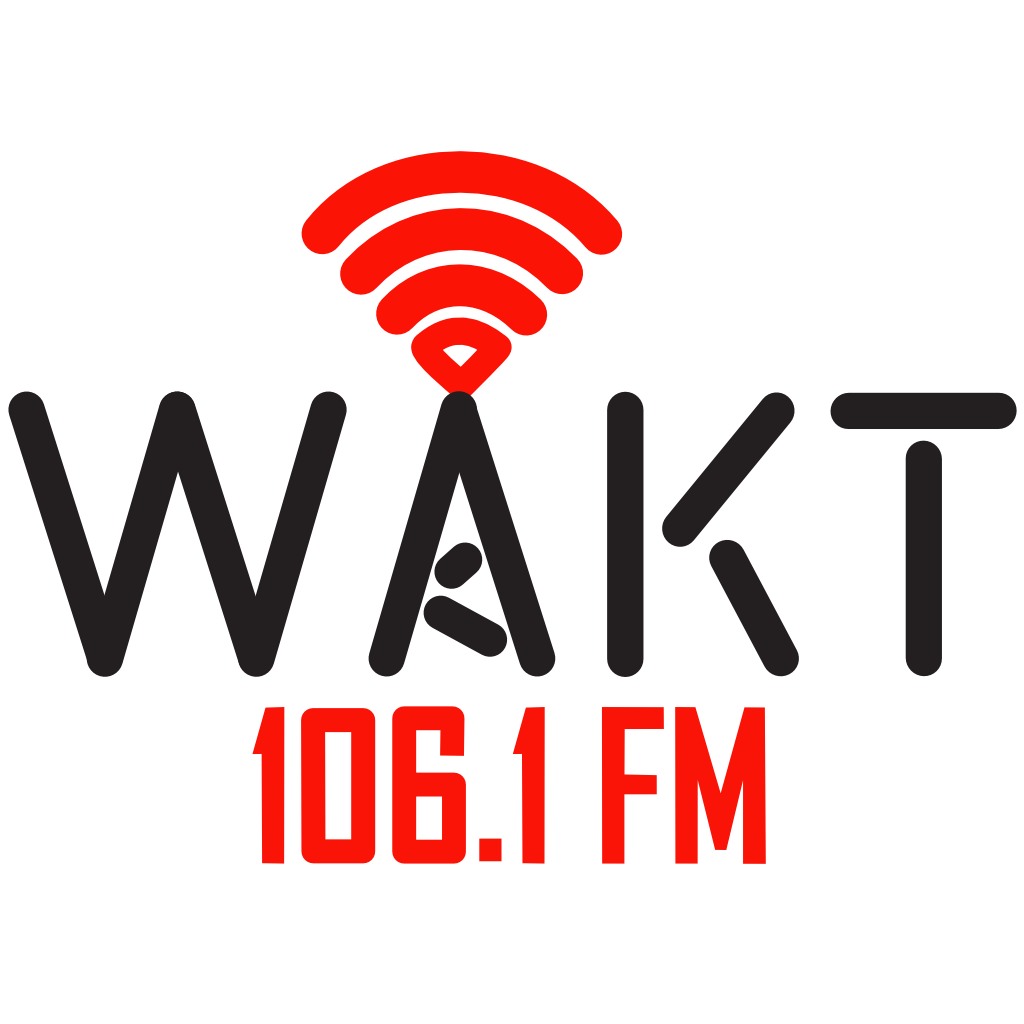

Toledo, OH; United States
- Broadcast area: Toledo metropolitan area
- Frequency: 106.1 MHz
- Branding: 106.1FM We Act Radio

Programming
- Format: Community - Variety
- Affiliations: Pacifica Foundation

Ownership
- Owner: Toledo Integrated Media Education

History
- Founded: 2017

Technical information
- Facility ID: 196981
- Class: LP100
- HAAT: 29
- Transmitter coordinates: 41°38′15.3″N 83°33′5″W

Links
- Website: www.toledoradio.org

WAKT-LP is a low-power FM community radio station from Toledo, Ohio.

== Overview ==
A small nonprofit, Toledo Integrated Media Education (TIME), applied for a low-power FM license on the 106.1FM frequency in 2013. After receiving approval to broadcast from the FCC, the organizers claimed the available call sign of WAKT and worked to assemble the appropriate funding, equipment, and permitting to begin broadcasting.

The station received authorization from the FCC to broadcast on 106.1 MHz in December 2014 and began broadcasting in a limited capacity in December 2017. Due to a lack of permitting from the local government, a makeshift tower only 30' high was used until permitting for a 100' tower could be obtained. The station began broadcasting from a 100' tower in October 2022, expanding its reach to much of the Toledo, Ohio metropolitan area.

The station follows a community radio model, allowing local residents to apply for programs during periodic public application windows. Those selected are provided with training, mentorship, and access to studio space in order to create and broadcast their own programming.

It is also a Pacifica affiliate, syndicating national programs such as Democracy Now!
