= WMIM =

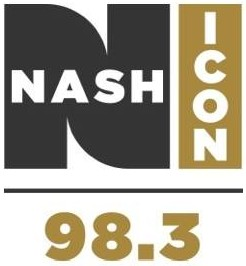
- Luna Pier, Michigan; United States
- Broadcast area: Toledo metropolitan area
- Frequency: 93.5 MHz (HD Radio)
- Branding: 98-3 Nash Icon

Programming
- Format: Country music
- Affiliations: Michigan Sports Network; Westwood One

Ownership
- Owner: Cumulus Media; (Cumulus Licensing LLC)
- Sister stations: WKKO, WQQO, WRQN (HD2), WXKR

History
- First air date: July 16, 1967
- Former call signs: WVMO (1967–1982); WTWR (1982–2010)
- Call sign meaning: Monroe, Michigan

Technical information
- Licensing authority: FCC
- Facility ID: 37119
- Class: A
- ERP: 3,400 watts
- HAAT: 135.1 meters (443 ft)
- Transmitter coordinates: 41.668°N 83.453°W

Links
- Public license information: Public file; LMS
- Webcast: Listen live
- Website: 983nashicon.com

WMIM (98.3 MHz) is a commercial FM radio station licensed to Luna Pier, Michigan, and serving the Toledo metropolitan area. It is owned by Cumulus Media and it airs a country music radio format, concentrating on the hits from the 1980s, 90s and early 2000s. It uses the moniker Nash Icon, a format programmed on several other Cumulus-owned stations around the country, including WSM-FM Nashville. On weekends, a syndicated country oldies show with Terri Clark is heard, along with specialty shows playing Bluegrass music and Southern Gospel.

WMIM has an effective radiated power (ERP) of 3,400 watts. The transmitter is located in Oregon, Ohio, off Cedar Point Road. WMIM's studios are on Monroe Street in Monroe, Michigan. Transmitter facilities are at 4009 York Road in Oregon, Ohio.

== History ==
The 98.3 frequency was licensed to Monroe for most of its history. The station signed on the air in July 1967 as WVMO (Voice of Monroe). It was founded by John Koehn of Adrian, also the founder of WLEN 103.9 FM, in Adrian, Michigan. WVMO was a block-programmed station typical of small markets, featuring hours of Middle of the Road (MOR), country music and Top 40 programming. According to a Billboard magazine item from June 1972, the station was on the air from 5:45 am to midnight and played MOR music until 6 p.m., when country DJ Dan Baker took over. WVMO was also an early radio job for Paul W. Smith, now morning host at Detroit's WJR.

On September 13, 1982, WVMO was purchased by Bruce Lesnick of Lesnick Communications, Inc. He grabbed the call letters WTWR - which had recently been relinquished by an FM station in Detroit - and debuted "Tower 98", with an Adult contemporary music format, which evolved into Top 40/CHR (contemporary hit radio) by the late 1990s. "Tower 98" served as "Monroe's Hit Music Station," and identified at the top of each hour as “WTWR, Monroe, Toledo, and Downriver Detroit.” The station had a minimal ratings presence in Toledo, though, until March 2003, when the station, now under Cumulus ownership, was granted a construction permit to change its city of license to Luna Pier and to move its transmitter south into Lucas County, Ohio, from Monroe County, Michigan.

For a time after the move, the station's playlist was so rhythmic-heavy that it began reporting to Radio & Records as a CHR/Rhythmic contemporary outlet rather than CHR/Pop (although it never did eliminate mainstream pop and rock music from its rotation).

Tower 98 took on the station name change from "Tower 98" to "Tower 98-3" in September 2005. This was when its reporting status went from CHR/Rhythmic back to CHR/Pop. Following the transition from Monroe to Toledo in early 2004, "Tower 98-3" had four programming directors: Terri McCormmick, "Train", Brent Carey and Steve Marshall. From Summer 2005 to Winter 2006, "Tower 98-3" saw its best ratings, defeating rival WVKS in the 18-34 demographic. In September 2007, Cumulus management made Tower 98-3 transition once again to focus on Monroe. After that, the ratings had fallen to a minimal presence in Toledo."WTWR 98.3 Monroe, MI Toledo, OH 11 January 1995".

On October 1, 2010, WTWR became WMIM, "Monroe's Best Mix, My 98-3", and returned to an AC format.

On September 30, 2014, Cumulus announced that 98.3 would flip to Country, joining the "Nash Icon" network as 98.3 Nash Icon, on October 3 at 5:00pm. The format flanks market leading sister station WKKO. At 11AM that day, after playing "Don't Stop Believin'" by Journey, WMIM dropped its AC format and began stunting by playing a different genre of music every hour as "98.3 _____ Icon", From 11 to Noon it was classic hits as "98.3 Pop Radio Icon", from Noon to 1PM '70s music as "98.3 Motown Icon", from 1PM to 2:00 pm one hit wonders as "98.3 One Hit Icon", and from 2:00 to 3:00 pm all British bands as "98.3 British Icon". At 5PM the station was introduced as 98.3 Nash Icon.
