= WJZE =

Coordinates: 41.472°N 83.418°W

Oak Harbor, Ohio; United States
- Broadcast area: Toledo, Ohio
- Frequency: 97.3 MHz
- Branding: HOT 97-3

Programming
- Format: Mainstream urban
- Affiliations: Compass Media Networks

Ownership
- Owner: Urban Radio Broadcasting; (GCR Licenses, LLC)
- Sister stations: WIMX

History
- First air date: September 18, 1993
- Former call signs: WFUA (1991–1993)
- Call sign meaning: WJZE = "Jazzy" (for its original format of Jazz)

Technical information
- Facility ID: 55183
- Class: A
- ERP: 4,300 watts
- HAAT: 118.1 meters (387 ft)

Links
- Webcast: Listen live
- Website: hot973.net

WJZE (97.3 FM) is a mainstream urban radio station serving the Toledo area in Ohio, United States. The Urban Radio Broadcasting outlet broadcasts with an ERP of 4,300 watts and is licensed to Oak Harbor, Ohio. The station's studios are located in downtown Toledo, and its transmitter is located west of Woodville, Ohio.

== History ==
=== Jazzy 97 ===
The Station was originally assigned the call letters WFUA but they were never used. 97.3 FM signed on September 18, 1993 with a Smooth Jazz format known as Jazzy 97, the call letters WJZE matched the station's name. The station was owned by Oak Harbor Community Broadcasting, Inc. The company's name would later change to RASP Broadcasting Enterprises, Inc. Studios and offices were located at 1600 Woodville Road in nearby Millbury.

=== Classic Rock 97.3 WJZE ===
WJZE dropped its smooth jazz format for classic rock in mid-1996. A few months prior to the change, 94.5 WXKR had dropped its popular classic rock format for Adult Alternative, leaving Toledo without a full-time classic rock station. The station became simply known as "Classic Rock 97.3 WJZE, the station that brought classic rock back to Toledo". WJZE did moderately well despite its spotty signal on the west side of town. However, on February 2, 1998, 94.5 WXKR changed its format back to classic rock. It soon became apparent, that with WXKR's 30,000–watt signal, WJZE could not compete with only 3,000 watts of power.

=== Buzz 106.5 and 97.3 ===
In the summer of 1998, WJZE dumped its Classic rock format for a full-time simulcast of WBUZ, going by the name "Buzz 106.5 and 97.3".

WBUZ (now WTOD) was sold to Cumulus Broadcasting in early 1999. 106.5 rebranded itself as "Pure Rock 106", the only time 97.3 was mentioned was in the top of the hour ID. The simulcast on WJZE continued until the agreement between WJZE and Cumulus ended.

=== 97.3 The Fox ===
On August 1, 2000, Clear Channel Broadcasting (now iHeartRadio) entered into a local marketing Agreement (LMA) with WJZE's owner RASP Broadcasting. The station became 97.3 The Fox, with a classic hits format. The station ran without DJs most of the day.

=== Hot 97.3 ===
In early 2005, RASP Broadcasting sold WJZE to Urban Radio Broadcasting. On March 15, the classic hits format was dropped in favor of an Urban format as "Hot 97.3".
