= Harbor View, Ohio =

- Village
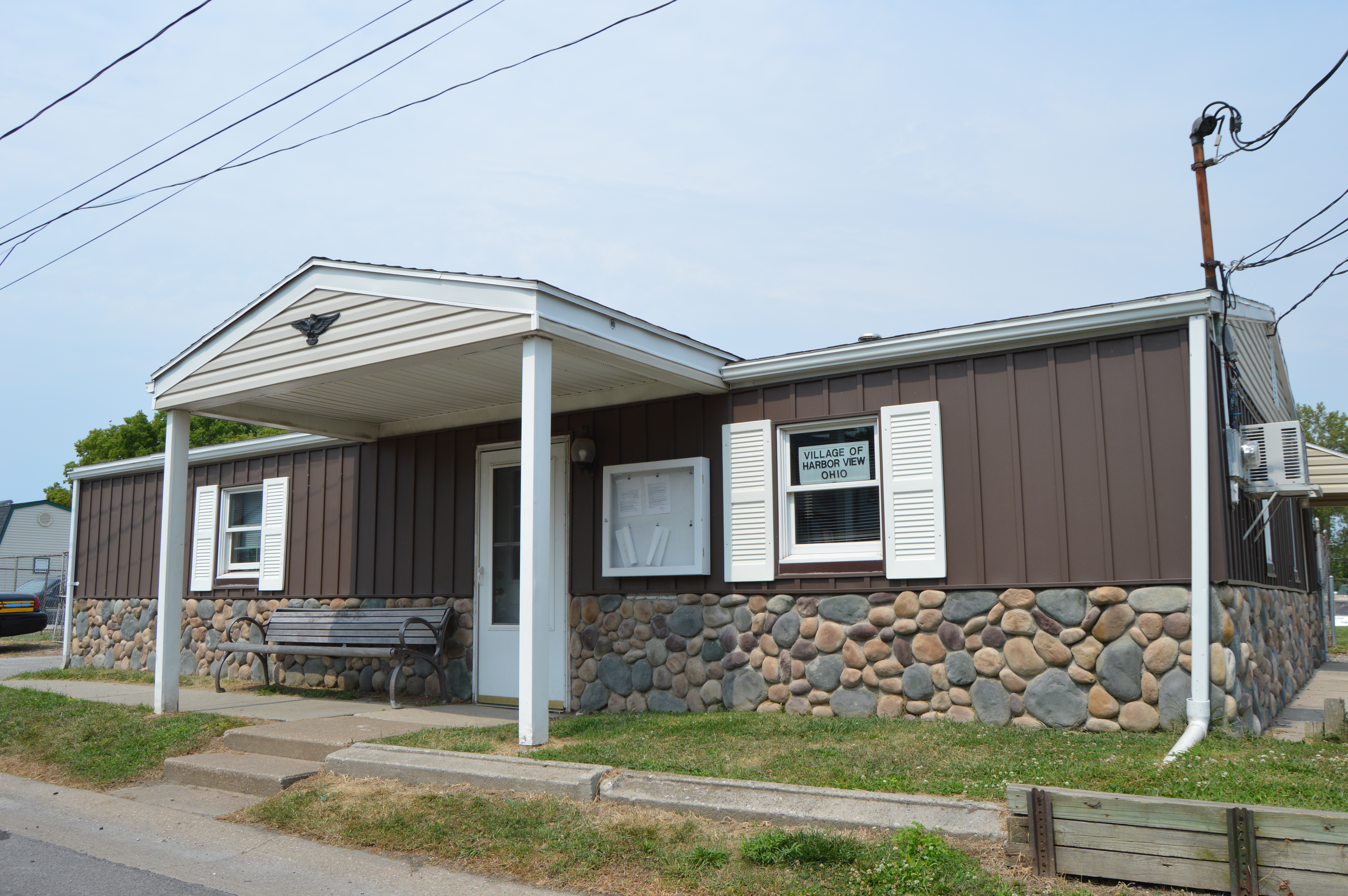
- Village hall

- Location in Lucas County and the state of Ohio.
- Coordinates: 41°41′36″N 83°26′41″W
- Country: United States
- State: Ohio
- County: Lucas
- Established: 1921

Government
  - Mayor: Rick Brink (D)

Area
  - Total: 0.023 sq mi (0.06 km^{2})
  - Land: 0.023 sq mi (0.06 km^{2})
  - Water: 0 sq mi (0.00 km^{2})
- Elevation: 581 ft (177 m)

Population (2020)
  - Total: 89
  - Estimate (2023): 90
  - Density: 3,837.2/sq mi (1,481.56/km^{2})
- Time zone: UTC-5 (Eastern (EST))
  - Summer (DST): UTC-4 (EDT)
- ZIP code: 43434
- Area code: 419
- FIPS code: 39-33376
- GNIS feature ID: 1086524

Harbor View is a village in Lucas County, Ohio, United States. The population was 89 at the 2020 census.

== Geography ==
According to the United States Census Bureau, the village has a total area of 0.03 square miles (0.08 km^{2}), all land. The village is completely encircled by the city of Oregon.

== Demographics ==
Historical population
Census	Pop.	Note	%±
1930	292		—
1940	361		23.6%
1950	392		8.6%
1960	273		−30.4%
1970	238		−12.8%
1980	164		−31.1%
1990	122		−25.6%
2000	99		−18.9%
2010	123		24.2%
2020	89		−27.6%
2023 (est.)	90	▲	1.1%
U.S. Decennial Census

=== 2010 census ===
As of the census of 2010, there were 123 people, 48 households, and 36 families living in the village. The population density was 4,100.0 inhabitants per square mile (1,583.0/km^{2}). There were 57 housing units at an average density of 1,900.0 per square mile (733.6/km^{2}). The racial makeup of the village was 96.7% White, 2.4% Asian, and 0.8% from two or more races. Hispanic or Latino of any race were 1.6% of the population.

There were 48 households, of which 33.3% had children under the age of 18 living with them, 50.0% were married couples living together, 12.5% had a female householder with no husband present, 12.5% had a male householder with no wife present, and 25.0% were non-families. 16.7% of all households were made up of individuals, and 6.3% had someone living alone who was 65 years of age or older. The average household size was 2.56 and the average family size was 2.89.

The median age in the village was 39.3 years. 23.6% of residents were under the age of 18; 6.5% were between the ages of 18 and 24; 27.6% were from 25 to 44; 30% were from 45 to 64; and 12.2% were 65 years of age or older. The gender makeup of the village was 47.2% male and 52.8% female.

=== 2000 census ===
As of the census of 2000, there were 99 people, 37 households, and 25 families living in the village. The population density was 3,398.5 inhabitants per square mile (1,312.2/km^{2}). There were 41 housing units at an average density of 1,407.5 per square mile (543.4/km^{2}). The racial makeup of the village was 95.96% White, 1.01% Native American, 3.03% from other races. Hispanic or Latino of any race were 6.06% of the population.

There were 37 households, out of which 35.1% had children under the age of 18 living with them, 48.6% were married couples living together, 16.2% had a female householder with no husband present, and 32.4% were non-families. 24.3% of all households were made up of individuals, and 13.5% had someone living alone who was 65 years of age or older. The average household size was 2.68 and the average family size was 3.24.

In the village, the population was spread out, with 29.3% under the age of 18, 10.1% from 18 to 24, 32.3% from 25 to 44, 18.2% from 45 to 64, and 10.1% who were 65 years of age or older. The median age was 37 years. For every 100 females there were 110.6 males. For every 100 females age 18 and over, there were 89.2 males.

The median income for a household in the village was $35,833, and the median income for a family was $40,625. Males had a median income of $26,563 versus $23,333 for females. The per capita income for the village was $13,163. There were 6.5% of families and 16.7% of the population living below the poverty line, including 26.3% of under eighteens and 28.6% of those over 64.
