= WKTN =

- Kenton, Ohio; United States
- Broadcast area: Hardin County, Ohio
- Frequency: 95.3 MHz
- Branding: 95.3 WKTN

Programming
- Format: Hot adult contemporary
- Affiliations: Ohio State Sports Network

Ownership
- Owner: Home Town Media Ltd.

History
- First air date: June 20, 1963
- Call sign meaning: KenToN

Technical information
- Licensing authority: FCC
- Facility ID: 54588
- Class: A
- ERP: 3,500 watts
- HAAT: 84 meters (276 ft)
- Transmitter coordinates: 40.645°N 83.566°W

Links
- Public license information: Public file; LMS
- Webcast: Listen live
- Website: wktn.com

WKTN is one of two radio stations operating in Hardin County, Ohio, United States. The other station is WOHA, a Catholic religion radio station. The format of WKTN is hot adult contemporary. It is currently owned by Home Town Media Ltd.

== Sports ==
WKTN broadcasts the competitions of the Kenton Wildcats, the sports teams of Kenton High School, as well as other county and regional school sports. Programs usually have play-by-play with color commentary. In addition the station also carries the games of the Ohio State University's football team.
