= WHSC (Hartsville, South Carolina) =

Radio station in Hartsville, South Carolina (1946–2016)

- Hartsville, South Carolina; United States
- Frequency: 1450 kHz

Ownership
- Owner: Hartsville Broadcasting Company (1946–1995); George Buck (1995–1998); Cumulus Media (1998–2016)

History
- First air date: October 1, 1946
- Last air date: March 15, 2016
- Former call signs: WHSC (1946–2010); WTOD (2010-March 11, 2016) WLQR (March 11–15, 2016)

Technical information
- Facility ID: 26328
- Class: C
- Power: 1,000 watts unlimited
- Transmitter coordinates: 34°21′16″N 80°4′6″W

WHSC (1450 AM) was a radio station licensed to Hartsville, South Carolina, United States, which operated from 1946 to 2016.

== History ==
The station began broadcasting on October 1, 1946, and held the call sign WHSC. It was owned by the Hartsville Broadcasting Company and ran 250 watts. In 1961, its daytime power was increased to 1,000 watts. In the late 1970s and early 1980s, the station aired a middle of the road (MOR) format.

In the 1980s, the station adopted a country music format. WHSC was a finalist in the 1983 Billboard Radio Awards Competition for Small Market Country Station of the Year. In January 1994, the station switched to a sports talk format. It adopted a talk format later that year, and was a Premiere Radio Networks affiliate.

In 1995, the station was sold to George Buck, along with WHSC-FM, for $300,000. In 1996, the station switched to a business news format, and was an affiliate of Bloomberg Radio. In 1997, WHSC adopted a country music format, with programming from ABC Radio's Real Country network.

In 1998, the station was sold to Cumulus Media, along with WHSC-FM, for $700,000. By 2001, the station had switched to an urban contemporary gospel format. In late 2001, the station began simulcasting WWFN-FM, initially airing an oldies format, and later airing CHR and sports formats. The station was silent for a period in 2008.

=== WTOD ===
The station took the WTOD call sign on April 23, 2010, from a former sister station in Toledo (spun off by Cumulus and now known as WWYC). The station was silent for a period in late 2010 and again from July 2013 to July 2014. In July 2014, the station was granted special temporary authority to operate from a new site at a reduced power, running 10 watts during daytime hours only.

=== End of operations ===
Before ceasing operations, WTOD simulcast WBZF. On March 11, 2016, WTOD changed callsigns to WLQR. Cumulus surrendered the station's license to the Federal Communications Commission (FCC) on March 15, 2016.
