= WIMX =

Coordinates: 41.472°N 83.418°W

Gibsonburg, Ohio; United States
- Broadcast area: Toledo, Ohio
- Frequency: 95.7 MHz
- Branding: Mix 95.7

Programming
- Format: Urban adult contemporary
- Affiliations: Premiere Networks

Ownership
- Owner: Urban Radio Broadcasting; (GCR Licenses, LLC)
- Sister stations: WJZE

History
- First air date: November 15, 1988 (as WRED)
- Call sign meaning: Anagram of "Mix"

Technical information
- Class: A
- ERP: 3,500 watts
- HAAT: 132 meters (433 ft)

Links
- Webcast: Listen Live
- Website: mix957.net

WIMX (95.7 FM) is an urban adult contemporary radio station licensed to Gibsonburg, Ohio, known as "Mix 95.7". The station's studios are located in downtown Toledo, and its transmitter is located west of Woodville, Ohio.

== History ==
=== WRED ===
The station began broadcasting on Monday, January 23, 1989. The original owners were longtime Toledo radio personality Buddy Carr and his wife Carolyn.

95.7 began with an Adult Contemporary format with the call letters WRED . The station was known as Red 96. In July 1989, the format was changed to Oldies.

Sometime later, Oldies was dropped for a full-time simulcast of Toledo classic country music station WTOD 1560AM.

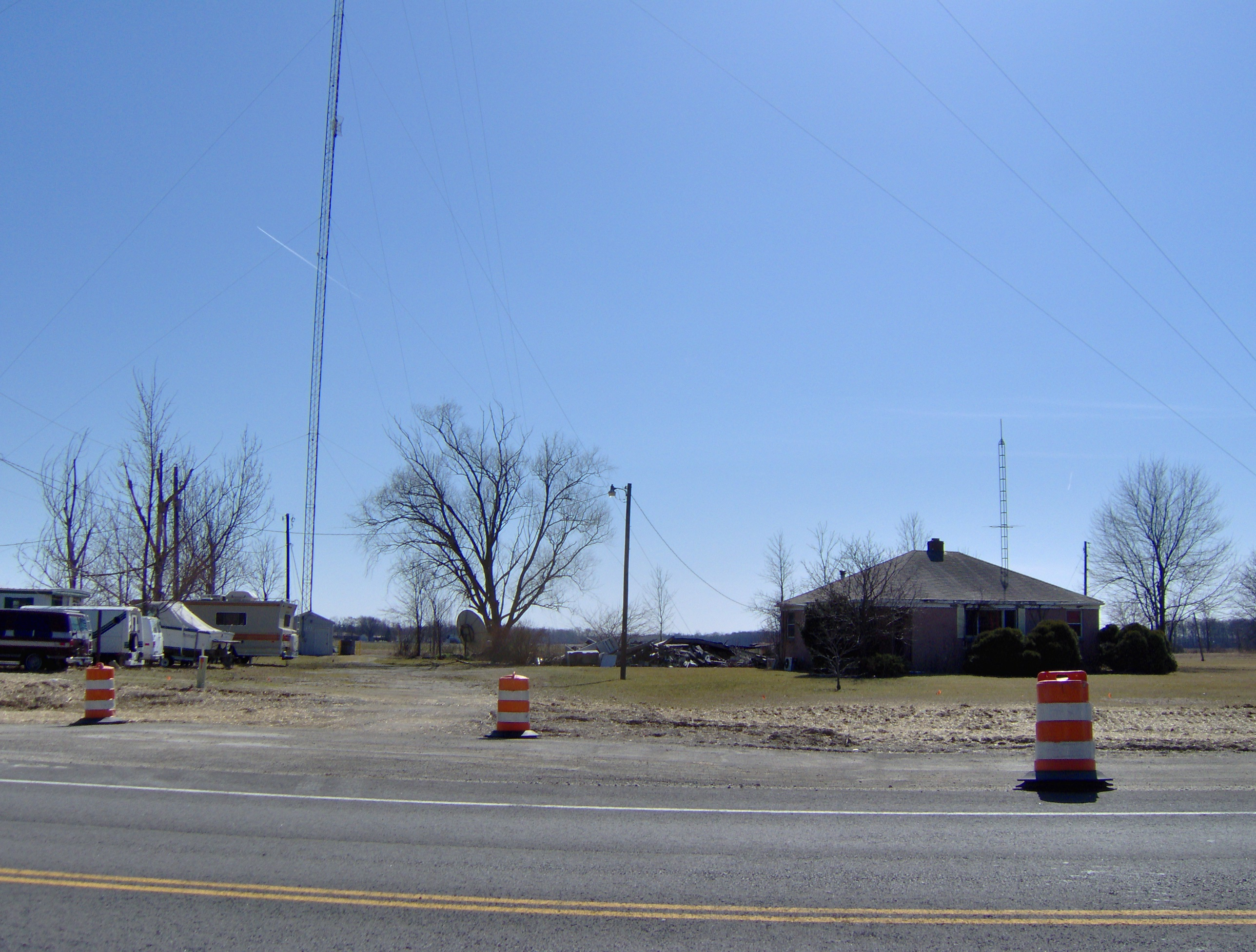
WIMX transmitter site and former studio building at 1201 Fremont Pike, Woodville, Ohio. The building at the right of the tower served as its studio location from its beginnings in 1988 to 1993.

=== Y95.7 ===
In 1993, Booth American, who was the owner of WKKO K-100 at the time, Entered into local marketing agreement (LMA) with the owners of WRED. The Federal Communications Commission (FCC) duopoly had recently relaxed rules to allow a broadcaster to control 2 FM stations in a single market. WRED's operations, now under Booth's control, moved to the same facility as WTOD and WKKO on Arlington Avenue in South Toledo. However, the antenna and transmitter facility (and a since-vacant studio building) remained in Woodville.

On August 30, 1993, the format was changed to Country, branded as "Young Country Y95.7", and changed call letters to WYHK. The LMA deal ended in 1995, and Booth America purchased the station outright.

=== Mix 95.7 ===
On March 20, 1996, the format was changed to Urban Adult Contemporary as "MIX 95.7". The callsign changed to WIMX. WIMX was later purchased by Cumulus Broadcasting in 1997. However, they were forced to sell WIMX due to FCC ownership limits. The station was sold to Riverside Broadcasting. Riverside Broadcasting then sold WIMX to its current owner, Urban Radio Broadcasting in April 2003 . The Steve Harvey Morning Show replaced the Tom Joyner Morning Show upon Joyner's retirement in 2019.
