= WTOD (FM) =

Radio station in Delta, Ohio

Delta, Ohio; United States
- Broadcast area: Toledo metropolitan area
- Frequency: 106.5 MHz (HD Radio)
- Branding: The Truth

Programming
- Format: Christian radio
- Subchannels: HD2: Contemporary Christian "Smile FM"

Ownership
- Owner: Delmarva Educational Association

History
- First air date: August 1, 1994
- Former call signs: WUIA (1990, CP); WMHE (1990–1994, CP); WBUZ (1994–2000); WRWK (2000–2009); WLQR-FM (2009–2016)
- Call sign meaning: Taken from the former WTOD (1560 AM), now WWYC

Technical information
- Licensing authority: FCC
- Facility ID: 67275
- Class: A
- ERP: 4,800 watts
- HAAT: 111.9 meters (367 ft)
- Transmitter coordinates: 41°30′50.5″N 83°51′00.2″W
- Translator: HD2: 103.3 W277BI (Toledo)

Links
- Public license information: Public file; LMS
- Webcast: Listen live
- Website: truthnetwork.com/station/wtod/

WTOD (106.5 MHz) is an FM radio station licensed to serve Delta, Ohio, covering the Toledo metropolitan area. WTOD is owned by Delmarva Educational Association, and the station’s transmitter resides in nearby Whitehouse.

== History ==
The construction permit for this station was first issued in 1990 to Dickey Broadcasting. The first assigned call letters were WUIA and then WMHE; neither were ever used.

Dickey Broadcasting (which would evolve into Cumulus Broadcasting) did not put the station on the air. This was due to confusion surrounding whether doing so would compromise FCC regulations. At the time, the FCC Rules prohibited a Broadcaster from having more than one AM and one FM property in the same market. Dickey Broadcasting already owned WWWM-FM (now WQQO) and WWWM 1470 (now defunct).

=== Buzz 106.5 ===
The license was sold for $149,920 in August 1993 to Toledo Radio, Inc. 106.5 signed on in the fall of 1994, taking the call letters WBUZ. "The Buzz" was a hybrid format of harder-edged alternative rock, nu metal, and album-oriented rock. The station quickly became popular, and in June 1996, added "The Howard Stern Show."

Despite the station's popularity, many on the east side of Toledo complained about poor radio reception. To alleviate this, in August 1998, WJZE's classic rock format was dropped for a full-time simulcast of The Buzz, with the station now referring to itself as "Buzz 106.5 and 97.3." "Double the buzz 106.5 west 97.3 east" was one of the station's slogans.

=== Rock 106 ===
The station was sold to Cumulus Broadcasting in early 1999. Once Cumulus took control, over a Weekend in late February 1999, the station stunted with an odd mixture of different music and sounds. After the Howard Stern Show on February 22, 1999, the station was re-launched as "Rock 106, Toledo's Pure Rock." The Howard Stern Show was dropped in early 2000. On August 1, 2000, the WJZE simulcast was dropped in favor of a classic hits format, thus ending the LMA with RASP Broadcasting. The call letters were changed from WBUZ to WRWK.

=== 106.5 The Zone ===
"Rock 106" never caught on with Toledo radio listeners; with low ratings along with being beaten by CIMX-FM (89X) from Windsor, Ontario, management decided it was time for a change. In November 2001, after stunting for a couple days with a loop of "Swans Splashdown" by J.J. Perrey & Gershon Kingsley and "Lonesome Road" by Dean Elliot & His Big Band, the format was changed to alternative as "106.5 The Zone". The first song on "The Zone" was "I'll Be Here Awhile" by 311. As The Zone, the station's ratings would fluctuate often, but usually did fairly well despite 106.5's signal being spotty in part of the Toledo market.

=== 106.5 The Ticket ===
In June 2009, The Zone's 7 1/2–year run came to an end, as the station's format changed to sports talk, simulcasting 1470 The Ticket (now defunct). The stations were re-branded as "106.5 The Ticket", only mentioning 1470 at the top of the hour. In August 2012, the simulcast with 1470 ended when that station took on a conservative talk radio format. On January 2, 2013, WLQR-FM became an affiliate of CBS Sports Radio, then switched back to ESPN Radio in early 2016. The callsign was changed to WTOD in September 2016.

On March 27, 2018, WTOD-FM was placed into the Cumulus Reorganization Divestiture Trust for a future sale.

=== Sale to Delmarva Educational Association ===
On January 21, 2021, the trust announced they would sell the station to the Delmarva Educational Association for $110,000. The deal was valued at $400,000 for tax purposes with the remainder of the $110,000 purchase being considered a charitable contribution from Cumulus. On May 1, 2021 at around 1:00am EST, the sports talk format was moved to WQQO-HD2 while Delmarva took over WTOD and started airing Christian talk and teaching, but fell silent later that day. The station returned to the airwaves on June 16, 2021, retaining the Christian talk and teaching format.
