= WWYC =

- Toledo, Ohio; United States
- Broadcast area: Toledo metropolitan area
- Frequency: 1560 kHz

Programming
- Format: Christian radio
- Network: CSN International

Ownership
- Owner: CSN International

History
- First air date: June 15, 1946
- Former call signs: WTOD (1946–2010)

Technical information
- Licensing authority: FCC
- Facility ID: 22672
- Class: D
- Power: 1,000 watts (day); 920 watts (critical hours); 3 watts (night)
- Transmitter coordinates: 41°37′0.2″N 83°37′16.8″W
- Translator: 99.5 W258BT (Perrysburg)

Links
- Public license information: Public file; LMS
- Webcast: Listen live
- Website: www.csnradio.com

WWYC (1560 AM) is a non-commercial radio station licensed to Toledo, Ohio, United States. Owned and operated by CSN International, WWYC carries CSN's lineup of Christian talk and teaching programs as a repeater of KAWZ in Twin Falls, Idaho.

Programming is also heard on FM translator W258BT at 99.5 MHz in Perrysburg.

== History ==
=== Standards, Top 40, Country ===
The station signed on the air on June 15, 1946. The original call sign was WTOD under the ownership of local labor rights attorney Edward Lamb, with studios at 515 Madison Avenue. The station was notable at its launch for having been among the fastest radio stations to sign-on after being awarded a construction permit. WTOD's initial staff was composed largely of veterans returning from World War II. WTOD was a daytimer, required to go off the air at sunset.

Lamb sold WTOD in 1957 to Detroit-based Booth Broadcasting. Originally a station typical of the golden age of radio playing adult standards, WTOD changed formats to Top 40 in 1959. The station was popular and competed with WOHO 1470 AM. The contemporary hit format lasted a decade.

In 1969, the format flipped to country music. WTOD became Toledo's first full time country station. In the early 1990s, WTOD was simulcast on WRED 95.7 (now WIMX). WTOD then became a simulcast of another country station, 99.9 WKKO. With a few exceptions, WTOD was a full time simulcast of WKKO until 2004.

=== Conservative talk and Christian radio ===
In the fall of 2004, the full-time simulcast of WKKO ended. At that point, WTOD became a syndicated conservative talk radio station. Hosts included Neal Boortz and Dave Ramsey. The weekends featured brokered programming, including Annunciation Radio, a Catholic-based religious show that would later wind up going full time on 89.7 WNOC.

In March 2010, it was announced that WTOD would be acquired by CSN International (the Christian Satellite Network). The station began airing talk and teaching shows from CSN. On April 23, 2010, the call sign was changed to WWYC.

== FM translator ==
WWYC simulcasts on a 250-watt FM translator on 99.5 FM, which is located in Perrysburg, Ohio.

Call sign	Frequency	City of license	FID	ERP (W)	Class	FCC info
W258BT	99.5 FM	Perrysburg, Ohio	92941	250	D	LMS

== See also ==
- CSN International translators
