= Toledo metropolitan area =

Coordinates: 41.6656°N 83.5753°W

- Metropolitan Statistical Area
- Toledo, OH MSA
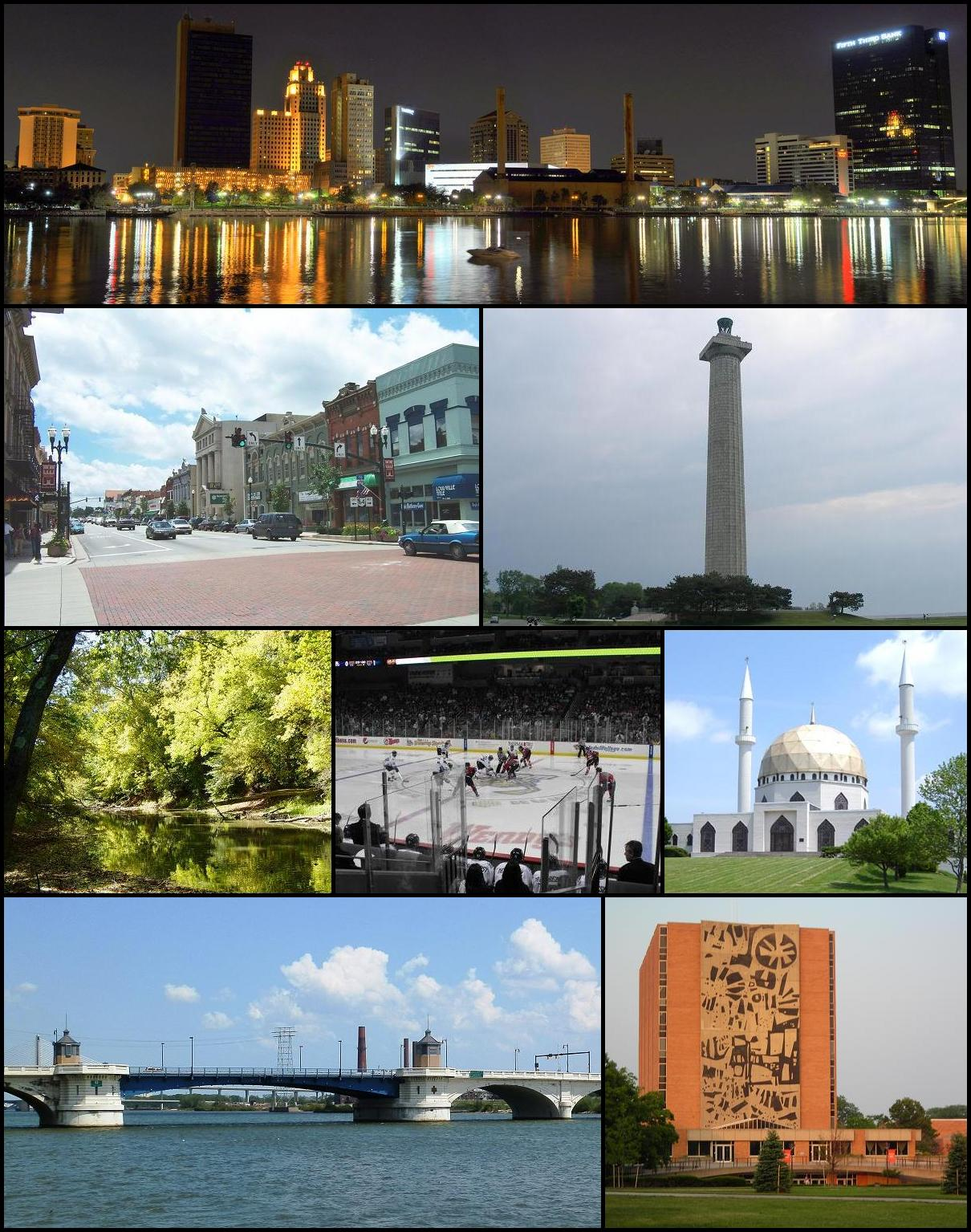
- Images, from top left to right: Toledo Skyline, Downtown Bowling Green in 2003, Put-in-Bay, Goll Woods Nature Preserve in Fulton County, Toledo Walleye game, Islamic Center of Greater Toledo in Perrysburg Township, MLK Bridge in Toledo, and the Jerome Library in Bowling Green.
Interactive Map of Toledo, OH MSA
City of Toledo
Toledo, OH MSA
- Country: United States
- State: Ohio
- Largest city: Toledo
- Other cities: List: Bowling Green; Perrysburg; Oregon; Sylvania; Maumee
- Counties: List: In MSA: Fulton; Lucas; Wood

Area
  - Urban: 240.4 sq mi (623 km^{2})
  - MSA: 1,619 sq mi (4,190 km^{2})

Population (2010)
  - Urban: 507,643 (80th)
  - Urban density: 2,111.3/sq mi (815.2/km^{2})
  - MSA: 641,816 (93rd)
  - MSA density: 402.3/sq mi (155.3/km^{2})
  - CSA: 712,373 (66th)

GDP
  - MSA: $45.846 billion (2022)
- Time zone: UTC−5 (EST)
  - Summer (DST): UTC−4 (EDT)
- Area codes: 419, 567

The Toledo Metropolitan Area, or Greater Toledo, is a metropolitan area centered on the American city of Toledo, Ohio. As of the 2020 census, the three-county Metropolitan Statistical Area (MSA) had a population of 646,604. It is the sixth-largest metropolitan area in the state of Ohio, behind Cincinnati–Northern Kentucky, Cleveland, Columbus, Dayton, and Akron.

Located on the border with Michigan, the metropolitan area includes the counties of Fulton, Lucas, and Wood. The Greater Toledo area has strong ties to Metro Detroit, located 40 miles (64 km) north, and has many daily commuters from southern Monroe County, Michigan. Toledo is also part of the Great Lakes Megalopolis.

Effective 2020, the separate micropolitan areas of Findlay, Fremont, and Tiffin were combined with the Toledo MSA to form a larger Toledo-Findlay-Tiffin Combined Statistical Area. However, when the metropolitan area delineations were published in July 2023, these micropolitan areas were detached.

The wider region of Northwest Ohio adds Defiance, Hancock, Henry, Ottawa, Paulding, Putnam, Sandusky, Seneca, Van Wert, and Williams counties.

== Regional education ==
There are several institutions of higher education that operate campuses in the area. Some of the larger schools include The University of Toledo, Mercy College of Ohio, and Davis College in Toledo. Additionally, Stautzenberger College in Maumee, Owens Community College in Perrysburg Township, and Bowling Green State University in Bowling Green operate in the area.

== Regional economy ==
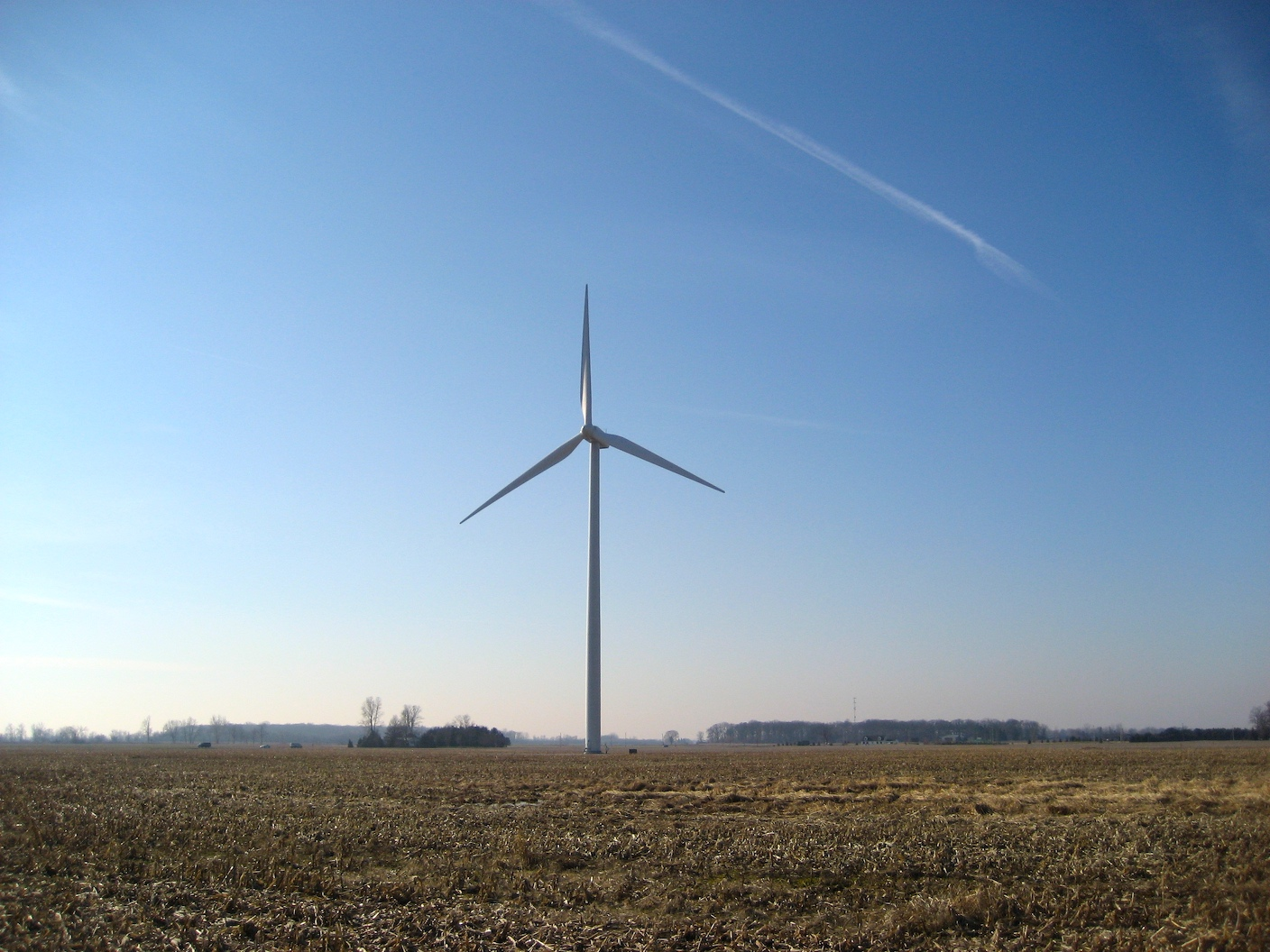
This Wind Turbine in Bowling Green is one of the many wind turbines in rural Northwest Ohio areas.

According to a 2015 article, there were three Toledo companies that made the Fortune 500 list. #399 is Owens-Illinois (O-I), which specializes in glass and glass packaging. #410 was Dana Corporation which is a global leader in the supply of thermal-management technologies among many other specialties. Lastly, at #498, Owens Corning is the world leading provider of glass fiber technology. Just outside of the Toledo metropolitan in neighboring Findlay, Ohio, #25 Marathon Petroleum Corporation is headquartered. There has been a recent revitalization of Downtown Toledo and the Warehouse District, bringing in many new restaurants and bars to the area.

The economy of Toledo has been heavily influenced by both the economy of nearby Detroit and agriculture. Recently, health care and technology firms have tried to make their way into the metropolitan, though growth in those sectors has been slow. Instead, Toledo and its suburbs are still home to several manufacturing and construction businesses and factories. The Bureau of Labor Statistics reported, in 2015, that manufacturing employment in Toledo had grown by 4.1% between December 2013 and December 2014 (this was double the rate than the United States average). More so, construction job growth grew by nearly 10% in the same time period. In 2014, manufacturing added 1,700 jobs to the Toledo area, but it also saw losses in the business services. In 2014, the US Census Estimated there were roughly 285,000 people employed in the Toledo metropolitan area. In August 2015, it was reported that Toledo's unemployment rate reached a 10-year low, and in June 2015 just 5% of the regional population was unemployed, whereas the United States average unemployment was at 5.3% during the same period.

== Demographics ==
Historical population
Census	Pop.	Note	%±
1900	153,559		—
1910	192,728		25.5%
1920	275,721		43.1%
1930	347,709		26.1%
1940	344,333		−1.0%
1950	395,551		14.9%
1960	594,151		50.2%
1970	644,262		8.4%
1980	656,940		2.0%
1990	654,157		−0.4%
2000	659,188		0.8%
2010	651,429		−1.2%
2020	646,604		−0.7%
2024 (est.)	641,088		−0.9%
U.S. Decennial Census

As of the census of 2010, there were 659,188 people, 259,973 households, and 169,384 families residing within the MSA. The racial makeup of the MSA was 83.03% White, 12.01% African American, 0.25% Native American, 1.07% Asian, 0.02% Pacific Islander, 1.79% from other races, and 1.83% from two or more races. Hispanic or Latino of any race were 4.35% of the population.

The median income for a household in the MSA was $42,686, and the median income for a family was $51,882. Males had a median income of $38,959 versus $25,738 for females. The per capita income for the MSA was $20,694.

County	Seat	2025 estimate	2020 Census	Change	Land area	Density
Lucas	Toledo	423,347	431,279	−1.84%	341 sq mi (880 km^{2})	1,241/sq mi (479/km^{2})
Wood	Bowling Green	134,176	132,248	+1.46%	617 sq mi (1,600 km^{2})	217/sq mi (84/km^{2})
Fulton	Wauseon	41,853	42,713	−2.01%	405 sq mi (1,050 km^{2})	103/sq mi (40/km^{2})
Total		599,376	606,240	−1.13%	1,363 sq mi (3,530 km^{2})	440/sq mi (170/km^{2})

== All communities and townships in the Toledo MSA ==
=== Fulton County ===
==== Communities ====
- Archbold
- Delta
- Fayette
- Lyons
- Metamora
- Swanton
- Wauseon

==== Townships ====
- Amboy
- Chesterfield
- Clinton
- Dover
- Franklin
- Fulton
- German
- Gorham
- Pike
- Royalton
- Swan Creek
- York

=== Lucas County ===
==== Communities ====
- Berkey
- Harbor View
- Holland
- Maumee
- Oregon
- Ottawa Hills
- Sylvania
- Toledo
- Waterville
- Whitehouse

==== Townships ====
- Harding
- Jerusalem
- Monclova
- Providence
- Richfield
- Spencer
- Springfield
- Swanton
- Sylvania
- Washington
- Waterville

=== Wood County ===
==== Communities ====
- Bairdstown
- Bloomdale
- Bowling Green
- Bradner
- Custar
- Cygnet
- Grand Rapids
- Haskins
- Hoytville
- Jerry City
- Luckey
- Millbury
- Milton Center
- North Baltimore
- Northwood
- Pemberville
- Perrysburg
- Portage
- Risingsun
- Rossford
- Tontogany
- Walbridge
- Wayne
- West Millgrove
- Weston

==== Townships ====
- Bloom
- Center
- Freedom
- Grand Rapids
- Henry
- Jackson
- Lake
- Liberty
- Middleton
- Milton
- Montgomery
- Perry
- Perrysburg
- Plain
- Portage
- Troy
- Washington
- Webster
- Weston
