= Toledo 5 =

Former cable channel in Toledo, Ohio, United States

Toledo 5, The CW
- Country: United States
- Broadcast area: Toledo, Ohio
- Network: Independent (1989–1995); The WB (1995–2006); The CW (2006–2014)
- Headquarters: Toledo, Ohio

Programming
- Language: English
- Picture format: 480i (1989–2014); 720p (2005–2014) (Note: Available only through HD-capable cable boxes)

Ownership
- Owner: Buckeye Cablesystem
- Parent: Block Communications

History
- Launched: 1971; 55 years ago (as local public access cable channel); August 7, 1989; 37 years ago (under traditional broadcast format)
- Closed: September 1, 2014; 12 years ago
- Replaced by: WTVG-DT2
- Former names: ToledoVision 5 (1989–2002); Toledo's WB5 (WT05) (2002–2006)

Toledo 5, The CW (formerly ToledoVision 5 and Toledo's WB 5, and alternately identified by the fictitious call letters "WT05") was a local origination cable television channel based in Toledo, Ohio, that was operated by the Buckeye CableSystem (now Buckeye Broadband), itself owned by locally based Block Communications. Originally exclusive to Buckeye's subscribers in Northwest Ohio and carried on channel 5 throughout its service area, the channel later expanded distribution to other cable providers throughout the Toledo designated market area (including Time Warner Cable and Comcast), which carried Toledo 5 on various channel positions determined by each provider.

The channel existed in several formats dating to the launch of Buckeye as "The CableSystem" in 1971, originating as a public access channel that also offered movies and sports events, before converting into a locally programmed independent format (branded as "ToledoVision 5") in August 1989, offering programs traditionally aired in syndication by broadcast stations. Channel 5 later became one of the first local cable channels to affiliate with a broadcast network: (Note: Although Fox operated a national cable feed for smaller media markets, Foxnet, from 1991 to 2006, it was carried by participating cable systems as a traditional cable channel with no local branding or advertising.) it carried The WB from February 1995 to September 2006, and successor The CW thereafter until Toledo 5's affiliation rights and programming inventory were acquired by ABC affiliate WTVG (channel 13), and transferred to the station's second digital subchannel in September 2014.

Despite having been a cable-only affiliate of both The WB and The CW, Toledo 5 was never part of their national feeds originally intended for local cable providers, The WB 100+ Station Group and The CW Plus, and had been independently programmed by Block/Buckeye with syndicated programming and sports filling time periods not occupied by network programs.

== History ==
=== Original format as a public access channel ===
The channel began operations in 1971, as the local entertainment and sports service of what was originally known as Buckeye Cablevision, (Note: Renamed The CableSystem in 1975, Buckeye CableSystem in 1998, and Buckeye Broadband in 2008.) founded in 1966 by Paul Block, Jr. and William Block, Sr. (whose family owned the city's daily newspaper, The Toledo Blade) to provide cable television service to the Toledo area. Channel 5A—the lone channel among the 11 that the system offered at the time not reserved for broadcast stations from the Toledo and Detroit–Windsor markets—was designated as a public access channel. (At the time, Buckeye utilized a dual-coaxial cable system—divided into "A" and "B" sides—to transmit its cable channels, offering two separate channel lineups that grouped each channel by the coaxial transmission to which they were fed, and later subdivided by set-based or converter box connection.)

It offered daily movie presentations (including "all-night" features that ran from late prime time through the overnight hours), local public affairs and talk programs, and local and regional sports events (including Michigan Wolverines and Ohio State Buckeyes football and basketball games, Toledo Rockets and Bowling Green Falcons basketball and hockey, and Toledo Mud Hens minor league baseball); after the CableSystem expanded its offerings to include cable-originated channels in the late 1970s, the channel also offered occasional free preview weekends of the premium services available to the provider's subscribers (HBO, Showtime and The Movie Channel, later to be joined in 1984 by The Disney Channel).

Nickelodeon occupied the channel space during the daytime hours from December 1979 to August 1989 (when the CableSystem moved the children's network to a full-time slot on Channels 6B/13B, allowing Nick at Nite programming to be made available to its subscribers). Channel 5A became the local carrier of upstart regional sports network Sports Time (a joint venture of Anheuser-Busch, Multimedia, Inc. and Tele-Communications Inc.) on April 2, 1984; among other Midwestern professional and college teams, the premium service offered Major League Baseball games from the Cleveland Indians (now the Cleveland Guardians) and Cincinnati Reds. After Sports Time ended operations on March 31, 1985, the channel reverted to its previous format of public access, sports and children's programming, which remained in place until its conversion into a general entertainment service.

=== Conversion into a cable-only independent station ===
On August 7, 1989, Channel 5A was relaunched as "ToledoVision 5" (referenced as "TV5" in local program listings, including in The Blade), adopting a programming format modeled after general entertainment independent stations, a format traditionally associated with broadcast television. It was one of the first local origination cable channels—and the first of two debuting that year—to adopt an entertainment-focused programming concept styled after local broadcast stations; just six weeks later, on September 21, American Television and Communications (ATC) launched "WGRC" on its Greater Rochester Cablevision system in Rochester, New York, with a similar format that incorporated more recent programs. ("WGRC" eventually evolved into an all-news format by July 1995; it now operates as Spectrum News 1 Rochester under current owner Charter Communications.)

Originally broadcasting for seven hours per day from 5 p.m. to midnight (with the Travel Channel occupying the channel space for the remainder of the day), its initial programming under the new format consisted of classic sitcoms, drama series and Westerns from the 1950s and 1960s (such as I Love Lucy, The Andy Griffith Show, Rawhide and Perry Mason), a daily late-afternoon block of Looney Tunes/Merrie Melodies animated shorts, prime time movies on Monday through Saturday nights, and the syndicated daily newscast USA Tonight. Channel 5A also entered into a news share agreement with NBC affiliate WTVG (channel 13, now an ABC affiliate), offering rebroadcasts of the station's weeknight 6 p.m. newscast (as a lead-in to its 8 p.m. movie presentations under the branding 13 News on Cable) as well as occasional specials (such as long-form primary and general election coverage); the WTVG agreement ended in September 1994.

In addition to continuing much of the channel's public access-era sports rights, the CableSystem entered into an agreement with the recently launched SportsChannel Ohio—which could not be carried full-time because of limited channel capacity (Note: The CableSystem had only reserved one channel for a regional sports network at the time, assigned to Detroit-based Pro-Am Sports System (PASS) and, after PASS ceased operations in November 1997, its pseudo-successor Fox Sports Detroit.)—to air its broadcasts of Indians and Reds baseball (the latter sublicensed through SportsChannel Cincinnati), and Notre Dame basketball and football games as well as SportsChannel America's package of NHL games on Channel 5A. (The CableSystem would eventually add what by that point had become Fox Sports Net Ohio in 2000.) Occasional free previews of The Disney Channel, another holdover from the public access format, also continued to be offered on Channel 5A until 1994. (Free previews of HBO, Showtime and The Movie Channel were concurrently moved to their corresponding channels to avoid conflicts with ToledoVision 5's more family-oriented format.) (Note: The CableSystem also offered occasional weekend-only pay-per-view previews of its premium services (mainly for The Movie Channel) through its Impulse Entertainment service starting in 1991.)

Notably, the channel's launch undercut an attempt by low-power station W48AP (channel 48, now MyNetworkTV affiliate WMNT-CD) to become the Toledo market's second independent outlet, despite Channel 48 having a six-month headstart on CableSystem Channel 5A's switch to entertainment programming. With the backing of Blade Communications (renamed Block Communications in 2008), most of the programming available on the syndication market that had not been acquired by Fox affiliate WUPW (channel 36)—which signed on in September 1985 as the city's first independent station—ended up with ToledoVision 5, along with a prime channel slot compared to W48AP's 29B slot and a refusal by Blade, which owned both The CableSystem and The Blade newspaper, to carry programming information for Channel 48 outside of paid advertisements in the Blade's television listings. W48AP would end up carrying lower-tier broadcast networks (including FamilyNet, Channel America and The Box) through the first half of the 1990s, and would not come back to any prominence until it became a charter UPN affiliate in 1995.

Channel 5A's programming expanded over the next few years, with the incorporation of more recent programming and the gradual replacement of Travel Channel programming by syndicated entertainment programs (expanding ToledoVision 5's broadcast day to 20 hours, from 6 a.m. to 2 a.m., by September 1994). By 1994, the channel's schedule consisted of first-run and off-network sitcoms and drama series, talk shows, live-action and animated children's programming, documentary-based reality series, fishing and hunting programs, religious programs, and more recent theatrical movies.

=== WB affiliation ===
On February 2, 1995, Channel 5A became Northwest Ohio's charter affiliate of The WB; W48AP (which adopted the WNGT-LP calls in 1996) had become the area's UPN affiliate on January 16. ToledoVision initially carried The WB's original Wednesday lineup on a one-day-delayed basis on Thursday nights. At the time of The WB's launch, ToledoVision 5 was the network's first locally based affiliate to be distributed exclusively over cable television, and one of only two cable-only affiliates overall: from the network's launch until October 1999, The WB was also available nationwide through the superstation feed of Chicago affiliate WGN-TV (relaunched as NewsNation in February 2021), which was added to the CableSystem's lineup in June 1994 as one of the initial offerings of its expanded basic tier (then known as "SelectChannels").

ToledoVision would eventually be joined by two other cable-only affiliates: Greater Rochester Cablevision–owned "WRWB" (now operating as a CW affiliate on a subchannel of local ABC affiliate WHAM-TV) in Rochester, New York, in January 1996, and by the Morgan Murphy Media–owned Television Wisconsin Network (TVW) (now operating as a MyNetworkTV affiliate on a subchannel of co-owned CBS affiliate WISC-TV) in Madison, Wisconsin, in January 1998. In September 1998, borrowing from the concept of the Fox network's Foxnet cable service, The WB launched The WeB (renamed The WB 100+ Station Group the following year), a national cable feed consisting of an affiliate group initially made exclusively of individually branded cable channels in the nation's 110 smallest media markets.

Upon joining The WB, ToledoVision 5's programming remained basically unchanged, continuing to feature syndicated programs and feature films; movies filled the 8 to 10 p.m. time slot on nights when neither WB prime time programs (initially offered only on Wednesdays at launch) nor sports events were scheduled to air, along with daily presentations in the late morning (starting in 1996) and early afternoon throughout the week. Sports also continued to be regularly featured on Channel 5 including Indians, Reds and Mud Hens baseball, Detroit Pistons NBA basketball (licensed from Detroit UPN owned-and-operated station WKBD-TV, now a CW affiliate), and various college sports such as Rockets and (through ESPN Regional Television) Big Ten basketball and football. Eventually, the Travel Channel was assigned its own full-time channel slot as part of Buckeye CableSystem's expanded basic tier, and the dual-coaxial system was converted to a modern single-coaxial digital system, leaving only TV5's entertainment programming on channel 5.

As The WB gradually transitioned to what would become a six-night-a-week prime time schedule (up through the launch of its Friday lineup in September 1999), resulting in increased scheduling conflicts with its sports broadcasts, Channel 5 ran network shows bumped from their regular timeslot for sports either following the game or in a different timeslot later in the week to fulfill programming obligations; Buckeye also deferred some of the SportsChannel/Fox Sports Net Ohio-licensed Reds and Indians telecasts to an alternate local origination channel (Channel 28 on both lineups or Channels 30B/96B, depending on the broadcast). Eventually on January 7, 2004, Buckeye CableSystem launched the Buckeye Cable Sports Network (BCSN) to take over Channel 5's professional, minor league and collegiate sports rights. In September 2002, the channel rebranded as "Toledo's WB 5", and began utilizing the fictitious alphanumeric call letters "WT05" for supplementary identification purposes.

As a cable-only channel transmitted using microwave and fiber optic relays, Channel 5 was subject to the "terrestrial exception", a legislative loophole implemented by the Federal Communications Commission (FCC) in 1992 to encourage investments in local programming by cable providers that would eventually allow services not distributed via satellite to avoid compliance with regulations requiring television channels to be offered to direct broadcast satellite providers. As such, even after other Toledo-area stations became available on satellite services, Channel 5's distribution was limited to Buckeye subscribers; Block/Buckeye eventually made the channel available to other Northwest Ohio cable providers, including Time Warner Cable (since acquired by Charter Communications) and Comcast, by the mid-2000s.

=== CW affiliation ===
On January 24, 2006, WB network co-owners Time Warner and CBS Corporation announced the formation of The CW, a network that would initially offer a mix of the most-watched programs originated on predecessors The WB and UPN—which their respective owners would shut down in concurrence with The CW's launch—with new series developed specifically for the CW schedule. Considered to be a strong WB affiliate, even with Toledo's unusual situation of being the largest market—and one of the few overall—where neither The WB or UPN had a conventional affiliate (given Channel 5's cable-exclusive status and Channel 48 transmitting a low-power signal viewable mainly in Toledo proper and surrounding suburbs), WT05 was chosen as its Toledo-area affiliate over WNGT.

Channel 5 affiliated with The CW at launch on September 18, 2006, leaving WNGT (which consequently adopted the WMNT-CA calls) as Northwest Ohio's MyNetworkTV affiliate. (The channel concurrently rebranded as "Toledo 5", with verbal brand references to The CW varying in on-air promotions.) Over-the-air viewers with a strong enough antenna were (and still are) able to access The CW through either WKBD-TV in Detroit (which Buckeye carries in its Michigan service area, and had briefly lost the affiliation to WADL in 2023) or WBNX-TV from Akron–Cleveland (except from 2018 to 2025, when the network aired locally on WUAB), depending on their location within the Toledo DMA.

=== Transfer of schedule and affiliation to WTVG-DT2 ===
On July 24, 2014, SJL Communications announced that it would sell WTVG to Gray Television. Gray indicated that it planned to add The CW to one of the station's digital subchannels, allowing Toledo-area viewers without a cable subscription to receive the network's programming for the first time. The move to WTVG would eventually allow SJL/Gray to add the subchannel as part of the station's carriage agreements, making a locally based CW affiliate available to subscribers of satellite (DirecTV) and virtual MVPD providers (Hulu, YouTube TV and DirecTV Stream) throughout the market, thus giving it more extensive pay-TV coverage than which predecessor WT05 could provide.

On September 1, 2014, Toledo 5's CW affiliation and syndicated programming inventory was moved to WTVG-DT2 (branded as "CW 13", after its parent station), replacing the Live Well Network over-the-air, and inheriting WT05's former channel 5 slot on Buckeye's cable lineup. Similar to Channel 5's 1989–94 news share agreement with the station, WTVG-DT2 would also incorporate simulcasts of its parent station's noon and 4 p.m. newscasts; an hour-long nightly 10 p.m. newscast—which had been in the planning stages since it acquired the CW affiliation—was added in September 2024 to directly compete with WUPW's longer-established prime time newscast. (Note: Produced by CBS affiliate WTOL (channel 11) from 1996 to 2000 and since 2012, and by WUPW's in-house news department in the intervening years until WTOL assumed operational control of the station under a shared services agreement.)

== See also ==
- Channel 5 branded TV stations in the United States
