= The WB =

American television network (1995–2006)

The WB Television Network
- Type: Defunct broadcast television network
- Country: United States
- Affiliates: List of former WB affiliates
- Headquarters: Burbank, California, U.S.

Ownership
- Owner: Warner Bros. Entertainment (Time Warner) (64%); Tribune Broadcasting (25%); Jamie Kellner (11%) (1995–2006)
- Parent: The WB Television Network Partners, L.P.

History
- Founded: November 2, 1993; 33 years ago
- Launched: January 11, 1995; 31 years ago
- Founder: Jamie Kellner
- Closed: September 17, 2006; 20 years ago
- Replaced by: The CW

Links
- Website: thewb.com (2005 archive)

The WB Television Network (known simply as The WB, and nicknamed "The Frog" after former mascot Michigan J. Frog) was an American broadcast television network that launched on January 11, 1995, as a joint venture amongst Warner Bros. Entertainment (the network's namesake and controlling owner), Tribune Broadcasting, and network president Jamie Kellner. It aired programs targeting teenagers and young adults aged 13 to 35, while its children's programming block, Kids' WB, targeted youth aged 4 to 12.

On January 24, 2006, Warner Bros. and CBS Corporation announced plans to merge The WB and competitor UPN into a new network, The CW, later that year. The WB ceased broadcasting on September 17, 2006, with some programs from both it and UPN (which shut down two days earlier) moving to The CW when it launched the following day, September 18. Time Warner re-used the WB brand for an online network that operated from 2008 to 2013 in the United States, which offered programs from the television network and the defunct In2TV service created before Time Warner's spinoff of AOL.

== History ==
=== 1993–1995: Origins ===
Much like its competitor UPN, The WB was created primarily in reaction to the Federal Communications Commission (FCC)'s April 1993 deregulation of media ownership rules that repealed the Financial Interest and Syndication Rules (fin-syn), and resulting fear that networks would stop buying programs from independent studios. Another reason was the success of the Fox network (which debuted in October 1986) and first-run syndicated programming during the late 1980s and early 1990s (such as Baywatch, Star Trek: The Next Generation, and War of the Worlds), as well as the erosion in ratings suffered by independent television stations due to the growth of cable television and movie rentals. The network can also trace its beginnings to the Prime Time Entertainment Network (PTEN), a programming service operated as a joint venture between Time Warner and the Chris-Craft Industries group of stations and launched in January 1993. It is known that both The WB and UPN were recognized as the fifth American television network after Fox, due to the intent behind both networks' creation, despite The WB and UPN's positions as the fifth and sixth national television networks, respectively. However, it is also recognized that, despite the "major" network status intent behind both, neither The WB nor UPN ever managed to secure "major" network status at any point during their lifespans. It has been speculated that the "The WB" branding was utilized for the network in order to distinguish it from the Warner Bros.-branded businesses (Pictures, Television, etc.) that existed at the time under the overall Warner Bros. umbrella organization.

Among the independent studios that the end of fin-syn affected was Warner Bros. Television. On November 2, 1993, the Warner Bros. Entertainment division of Time Warner announced the formation of The WB Television Network, with the Tribune Company holding a minority interest. As such, Tribune Broadcasting signed agreements to affiliate six of its seven television stations, all independent, including the television group's two largest stations, WPIX in New York City and KTLA in Los Angeles – with the network. Only five of these stations, along with a sixth that Tribune acquired the following year, would join The WB at launch; the company's Atlanta independent WGNX would instead agree to affiliate with CBS in September 1994, as a result of Fox's affiliation deal with New World Communications, then-owner of longtime CBS station WAGA-TV. In contrast, New Orleans sister station WGNO did become a WB charter affiliate before joining ABC in January 1996 due to a similar affiliation deal between Fox and SF Broadcasting, owner of longtime ABC station WVUE-TV.

On December 3, 1993, The WB announced a separate affiliation agreement with Tribune for its Chicago flagship station WGN-TV (which originally planned to remain an independent station due to concerns about handling its sports programming commitments while maintaining a network affiliation); through this deal, WGN's superstation feed would provide additional national distribution for The WB as a cable-only affiliate, in order to give the network time to fill gaps in markets where it was unable to find an affiliate at launch. Although Tribune had a minority stake in the network, its stations were not technically considered owned-and-operated stations of The WB since Time Warner held controlling interest in the network's ownership.

When the network was announced, The WB planned to run a predominantly network-programmed schedule over time. It was originally slated to launch with two nights of primetime programming in its first year, and two additional nights of primetime programming, a nightly half-hour in late primetime, 4½ hours of weekday daytime programming and a four-hour Saturday morning children's lineup in its second year. By the third year, a fifth night of primetime and 1½ hours of weekday programming outside of primetime would have been added, followed by an additional hour of programming in primetime and 1½ hours on weekday afternoons by the network's fourth year, and a seventh night of primetime in the fifth year of operation. However, this plan was scaled back dramatically, partly to address potential sports-related programming conflicts on WGN and certain other affiliates (including WPIX and KTLA), as The WB launched with only one night of primetime programming; and by September 1995, the network added only one additional night (Sundays), along with a three-hour Saturday morning (later expanded to four, then five hours), one-hour weekday morning and two-hour weekday afternoon children's block.

Warner Bros. appointed many former Fox executives to run the network, including the network's original chief executive Jamie Kellner, who served as president of Fox from 1986 to 1993; and president of programming Garth Ancier, who was the programming chief of Fox from 1986 to 1989.

=== 1995–1997: Beginnings ===
The WB Television Network launched on January 11, 1995, with the debut airing of the first episode of The Wayans Bros. (a sitcom starring comedians Shawn and Marlon Wayans) as its first program. The classic Warner Bros. cartoon character Michigan J. Frog appeared on-air as the network's official mascot (with animator Chuck Jones, in person, drawing him out after Bugs Bunny and Daffy Duck argued about who should launch The WB during the network's premiere), and would remain as part of the network's branding in one form or another until 2005.

Much of the network's branding was based around Warner Bros. locations and characters: the television network's original logo (which was originally displayed upright until 1998, and displayed at a titled angle thereafter) was based on the typography of the iconic Warner Bros. Pictures' "shield" logo; network promotions and imaging campaigns for The WB and the Kids' WB block from their launches until the 2003–2004 season were also respectively centered on the Warner Bros. Studios backlot and the Warner Bros. Ranch Facilities, often involving large marquee signs promoting the nights of programming and their component shows (at times including signs for Kids' WB and certain shows from that block); this approach was similar to one used for Fox's 1989–90 "This is the Year" fall campaign (likely borrowed for The WB by former Fox executives Kellner and Ancier). Local station IDs initially used by some WB affiliates until 1997—set to a soft orchestral theme incorporating the musical signature of "Hello Ma Baby"—featured moving projections of the "WB" lettering on CGI models of the Warner Bros. studio lot, with the end tag (in which the affiliate's logo is displayed) prominently featuring the lot's water tower next to a translucent outline of the "WB" logotype (which is briefly lit up as the image zooms out to show the tower and model soundstages).

The WB's scheduling structure was similar to Fox's when it launched, as it started with one night a week of programming and then gradually added additional nights of programming over the course of several seasons: the network started with a two-hour Wednesday night lineup of sitcoms, airing from 8:00 to 10:00 p.m. Eastern and Pacific Time. The limited amount of network programming in The WB's early years essentially rendered its affiliates as nominal independent stations; because of this, affiliates held the responsibility of programming primetime slots on nights that the network did not program, airing either first-run and/or off-network syndicated programs or more commonly, movies.

Several of the network's first programs were black sitcoms. Four of the five shows that debuted in the network's first nine months were renewed beyond the first year – The Wayans Bros., Unhappily Ever After (a dysfunctional family sitcom from Married... with Children co-creator Ron Leavitt), The Parent 'Hood (a family sitcom starring and co-created by Robert Townsend), and Sister, Sister (a teen/blended family sitcom starring Tia and Tamera Mowry that was picked up by the network after its cancellation by ABC in the spring of 1995). The four shows had a lasting impact on audiences, while a fifth show, Muscle (a sitcom that parodied primetime soap operas), was canceled after one season due to low ratings, and ultimately replaced with Sister, Sister.

On August 17, 1995, the Tribune Company acquired a 12.5% limited partnership interest in The WB for $12 million; the deal gave Tribune an option to increase its stake in the network up to a 25% interest; Tribune would eventually increase its ownership share in The WB to 22.5% on March 31, 1997.

The WB expanded its programming to Sunday nights for the 1995–96 season, but none of the new shows (including the Kirk Cameron vehicle Kirk and night-time soap opera Savannah) managed to garner much viewing interest. The network also launched the Kids' WB programming block in September 1995, which featured a mix of existing Warner Bros. animated series that originated either on Fox Kids or in syndication and originally aired on Monday through Saturday mornings. The WB continued to expand in the 1996–97 season, adding programming on Monday nights. This season gave The WB modest hits in the Aaron Spelling-produced family drama 7th Heaven (centering on a reverend and his family) and comedies The Steve Harvey Show (starring Harvey as a funk musician working as a music teacher at an inner-city Chicago high school), and The Jamie Foxx Show (starring Foxx as an aspiring actor/singer working at a Los Angeles hotel owned by his aunt and uncle).

=== 1997–2000: Courting the teen market ===
The WB first had success with Buffy the Vampire Slayer (a series based on the 1992 film of the same name) which became a hit with critics when it premiered as a mid-season replacement in March 1997. The series debuted with the highest Monday night ratings in The WB's history, attracting not only new teenage viewers, but new advertisers as well.

Inspired by Buffy's success, The WB intentionally shifted the focus of its programming, trying to capture what it perceived to be a heavily fragmented market by marketing to the under-courted teen demographic. While the Fox network, the previous destination for teen television (with shows such as Beverly Hills, 90210, Party of Five and Parker Lewis Can't Lose), began to court older audiences with shows such as Ally McBeal, The WB began to craft its identity with programs targeted at teenagers. The WB's breakout hit and, arguably, its signature series was Dawson's Creek, which debuted in January 1998 to what were then the highest ratings in The WB's history (and made stars out of its four principal actors, James Van Der Beek, Michelle Williams, Joshua Jackson, and Katie Holmes). The series was produced by Columbia TriStar Television and it quickly became the highest-rated show on television among teenage girls, and the most popular program on The WB. The popularity of Dawson helped boost The WB's other shows, such as Buffy, which served as its lead-in on The WB's new night of programming that also launched in January 1998, branded as "New Tuesday", and 7th Heaven, which enjoyed a massive 81% increase in viewership that season.

With three hit shows in its roster, The WB continued to build its teen fanbase the following season with college drama Felicity (which made a star out of lead Keri Russell) and the wicca-themed Charmed (which was also produced by Aaron Spelling, and co-starred Alyssa Milano, Holly Marie Combs and 90210 alumna Shannen Doherty), both of which set new records for the network when they respectively premiered to 7.1 and 7.7 million viewers; Charmed had the highest-rated premiere on the network until Smallville broke its record, debuting to 8.4 million viewers in October 2001. At the start of the 1998–99 season, the network expanded its programming to Thursday nights. That season, 7th Heaven overtook Dawson's Creek as the network's highest-rated program, and garnered The WB the highest ratings it would ever see – the show's February 8, 1999, episode attracted 12.5 million viewers.

For the 1999–2000 season, the network concluded its primetime expansion with the addition of programming on Friday nights. New shows that season included Roswell, Popular, and the Buffy the Vampire Slayer spin-off Angel, the latter of which premiered with 7.5 million viewers – the second-highest rated premiere for the network at the time. During this season, The WB was the only network to have gains in its total audience viewership and in each key demographic.

=== 2000–2003: Broadening the focus ===
As the teen boom of the late 1990s began to wane, The WB attempted to broaden the scope of its primetime lineup. Although teen-oriented fare like Popular and Roswell had premiered to strong ratings, both series saw serious ratings erosion in their sophomore seasons, leading the network to cancel them both (Roswell, like Buffy the Vampire Slayer, would end up being revived by rival network UPN). Meanwhile, even though ratings for 7th Heaven, Buffy and Charmed remained consistent, viewership for flagship series such as Felicity and Dawson's Creek began sagging. The network realized that it could no longer rely merely on the tastes of young teenage girls, and thus began moving back into more family-friendly fare, attempting to launch a successful sitcom, and generally targeting a more diverse audience.

This new strategy came as The WB had dropped to sixth place in the ratings among all major broadcast networks (behind UPN) during the 1999–2000 season, losing 19% of its household audience. Executives for the network attributed the ratings decline in large part due to the Tribune Company's decision to remove WB network programming from WGN-TV's superstation feed in October 1999, on the pretense that the network's national distribution was large enough that it was no longer necessary for WGN to broadcast The WB's programs outside of Chicago; the network reached several affiliation deals during the prior four years with various station owners (such as the Sinclair Broadcast Group and Pappas Telecasting Companies), buoyed by the September 1998 launch of The WB 100+ Station Group, a national cable-only service that served most of the 110 smallest Nielsen media markets in the United States that did not have enough television stations to support an over-the-air affiliate. The removal of The WB's programs from the WGN national feed effectively reduced the network's potential household audience by 10 million homes (WGN-TV continued to carry WB programming over-the-air and on cable within the Chicago market until the network shut down in 2006).

Despite the slight downturn in the network's fortunes, there were a few bright spots during the era. Gilmore Girls, which debuted in 2000, netted meager ratings when it debuted in a tough Thursday timeslot (where it competed against NBC's powerhouse Must See TV lineup), but subsequently grew into one of the network's most successful shows after moving to Tuesdays in 2001, where it remained for six seasons (before moving to The CW for its seventh and final season). Also in the fall of 2000, the fantasy sitcom Sabrina, the Teenage Witch moved from ABC to The WB as part of its Friday night schedule; the show continued on the network for three more seasons before ending in May 2003.

Time Warner transferred operational duties for The WB from Warner Bros. over to its Turner Broadcasting System division in 2001. On November 12, 2002, chairman Jamie Kellner – who became chairman and chief executive officer of the Turner Broadcasting System concurrent with that deal – sold his 11% stake in The WB to majority corporate parent AOL Time Warner, leaving it and minority owner, the Tribune Company, as the only partners in the network. Following Kellner's departure from Turner, AOL Time Warner reassigned the network's operations back to the Warner Bros. unit in 2003.

In October 2001, the Superman-inspired Smallville debuted with 8.4 million viewers, the highest-rated premiere in the history of the network; that show was also important because it was one of the few series that drew a substantial male viewership. 2001 also saw the launch of the Reba McEntire vehicle Reba, arguably the network's most successful comedy; Reba and Sabrina served as the linchpins of a new Friday night sitcom block that debuted in October 2001 (delayed from a mid-September launch, as other networks did with their fall schedules following the September 11 terrorist attacks) and continued for much of the remainder of the network's run (comedies on that night were relegated to one hour in April 2006, with reality series filling the 8:00 p.m. hour). Other series to gain attention during this period were the family drama Everwood, and the soap satire Grosse Pointe.

=== 2003–2006: Decline ===
Despite some early success, The WB struggled to shift its focus from the female 12–24 demographic to the broader 12–34 range, in its attempt to attract a broader young adult audience. In 2005, The WB retired Michigan J. Frog, as The WB's trademark mascot. The WB's president of entertainment at the time, David Janollari, explained in July 2005 at the network's summer press tour that "[Michigan] was a symbol that perpetuated the young-teen feel of the network. That's not the image we [now] want to put to our audience."

Still, the move did not seem to help The WB. The period from 2003 to 2005 produced only three viable new series, the teen-oriented drama One Tree Hill, social experiment reality competition Beauty and the Geek, and fantasy drama Supernatural (all of which ultimately moved to successor network The CW), and even still their ratings paled in comparison to the ratings peaks of Dawson's Creek, which had ended its run in May 2003. Ratings dropped for many of The WB's shows, while also cancelling shows with steady ratings such as Angel; the network failed to launch new hit shows to take their places.

Although The WB's well-known inability to launch successful comedy series was nothing new (Reba being a notable exception), this period saw The WB struggling to establish new dramas as well. High-profile failures included Birds of Prey (a series inspired by the Batman mythos, which premiered in October 2002 with an impressive 8 share), Tarzan, Jack & Bobby, The Mountain, the Jerry Bruckheimer-produced legal dramedy Just Legal, the Marta Kauffman-created dramedy Related, and the Rebecca Romijn vehicle Pepper Dennis.

During the 2004–05 season, The WB finished behind rival UPN for the first time in four years and fell even further behind in fall 2005. Both networks fell behind Spanish language network Univision in the overall 18–34 demographic. Between November and December 2005, the network laid off approximately 40 employees amid continued ratings and profit losses (with viewership down 12% by November 2005), with network representatives expecting The WB to lose about $35 million during the 2005–06 fiscal year. The WB was programming six days and 13 hours per week at this time.

=== 2006: Network closure ===
On January 24, 2006, CBS Corporation and Warner Bros. Entertainment announced plans to shut down both UPN and The WB and partner to launch a new broadcast television network that would include series from both soon-to-be predecessor networks, known as The CW. Over the next eight months, it was to be seen which shows from the two networks would cross over to The CW, as well as which stations aligned with either UPN or The WB would become future affiliates of the new network. In the end, seven shows from The WB, 7th Heaven, Beauty and the Geek, Gilmore Girls, One Tree Hill, Reba, Smallville, and Supernatural were chosen to move to The CW for its inaugural 2006–07 fall schedule. 7th Heaven and Reba were originally canceled after the 2005–06 season but were ultimately renewed at the last minute with 13-episode deals (7th Heaven was later given a full-season order, while Reba served as a midseason replacement and, despite becoming The CW's highest-rated comedy of the 2006–07 season, ended rather abruptly). Supernatural, which aired its final (15th) season in the fall of 2020, was the last surviving series from The WB that remained on the CW network schedule.

Tribune Broadcasting also committed 16 of its 19 WB-affiliated stations at the time to serve as the network's core affiliates (though it relinquished its stake in The WB shortly after the launch announcement for The CW, in order to avoid shouldering shutdown costs for The WB, and would not take on an ownership stake in The CW) – alongside 11 UPN O&Os that were named as CW charter stations by CBS Corporation. Starting on August 14, 2006, with the Daytime WB block, The WB stopped displaying its on-screen logo bug during the network's programming and replaced it with a countdown of days until The CW's premiere. Some stations that either affiliated with MyNetworkTV (itself created in response to Tribune and CBS receiving affiliation deals with The CW, leaving UPN affiliates owned by Fox Television Stations, a subsidiary of MyNetworkTV's original parent company News Corporation, with the prospect of ending up as independents), became independent stations or became CW charter affiliates received a logo-free feed of the network, while others took the main feed and overlaid the station's own logo bug over The CW's logo.

The WB aired its final night of programming on September 17, 2006, with The Night of Favorites and Farewells, a five-hour block of pilot episodes of the network's past signature series. Commercial breaks featured re-airings of past image campaigns and network promotions, along with promotional spots given to cable networks carrying these shows in off-network syndication and ads for each series' TV-on-DVD box set. The 60-second montage that closed The WB's existence featured many well-known stars from shows which aired during the 11-year run of the network, ending with the statement:

"For 11 years, you brought us into your homes. We made you smile and tugged at your heart. And now, we say goodbye. From all of us at The WB, thank you."

The final image seen in the montage was former network mascot Michigan J. Frog (who was shown as a silhouette due to the animated character being retired as The WB's mascot the year before), who is shown taking his hat off and bowing, thanking the audience for watching the network for 11 years and marking the end of The WB.

Shortly thereafter, after the studio credits (instead of The WB's standard credits scheme) for the Dawson's Creek pilot aired, several former WB affiliates acknowledged their switch to The CW on their newscasts, with most adopting their new CW branding immediately. One instance of this was New York City affiliate WPIX, who aired a montage of logos the station has used throughout its history, leading up to its new "CW11" logo before the start of its 10:00 p.m. newscast.

The final night of WB programming netted relatively low ratings. The network scored a 1.0 household rating (amounting to 1% of all U.S. television households) and a share of 2, meaning just 2% of viewers were tuned into The WB on its final night of programming. This was mostly due to the fact that some WB affiliates in certain areas had already joined MyNetworkTV, which debuted on September 5, two weeks before The CW's launch, leaving The WB's final two weeks of programming unavailable in those areas. After its closure, the network's URLs were redirected to The CW's website, cwtv.com. By March 30, 2008, the URLs redirected to the Warner Bros. Studios homepage, before being redirected to the TheWB.com beta website one month later on April 28.

The CW maintained many operational and scheduling elements from The WB. When it launched on September 18, 2006, The CW initially maintained The WB's scheduling model; The WB had carried 30 hours of network programming each week (13 of which were devoted to primetime shows) in comparison to UPN's weekly programming total of 12 hours (10 hours of which were allocated to primetime shows). It also inherited The WB 100+ Station Group – which became The CW Plus – though the distribution model of The CW Plus started to differ from The WB 100+ by mixing digital subchannel affiliations, alongside the cable-only affiliates and few conventional affiliate stations that were part of the predecessor group at the end of The WB's run. The CW continued the Daytime WB block – which became The CW Daytime (and was reduced from two hours to one in 2010), although three blocks that moved to The CW from The WB would eventually be discontinued: Kids' WB continued on The CW until May 17, 2008, when it was replaced with The CW4Kids after 4Kids Entertainment began programming The CW's Saturday morning block through a time-lease agreement (Kids' WB was later relaunched as an online portal); The CW discontinued its Sunday primetime schedule in September 2009, effectively ending the EasyView block in the process (The CW returned to Sunday primetime nights on October 14, 2018, but with only two hours to program), and dropped the CW Daytime block in the 2021–22 season in favor of a weekly Saturday-night primetime schedule.

=== 2008–2013: Internet streaming ===
Logo as an internet-only streaming service, used from August 2010 until TheWB.com's shutdown in December 2013.

Warner Bros.' television arm planned on resurrecting the WB brand in the form of a website at TheWB.com, the website domain used for the official site of the broadcast network. The site streamed episodes of series that were broadcast during The WB's 1995–2006 run, including Gilmore Girls, Smallville, Everwood, Buffy the Vampire Slayer, Dawson's Creek, One Tree Hill, Roswell, and What I Like About You. The new incarnation of the TheWB.com began in beta testing on April 28, 2008, and officially launched on August 27, 2008. The site – whose business model resembled that of free-to-stream services such as Hulu – was ad-supported and geared primarily to men, and women ages 15–39. In addition to older full-length series (among which also included All of Us, Hangin' with Mr. Cooper, Martin, Jack & Bobby, and Veronica Mars), the website featured original serialized web content including short series and vignettes from such well-known television producers as Josh Schwartz and McG, including Sorority Forever, Pushed, Rockville, CA, The Lake, and Children's Hospital (the latter's popularity was sustained enough to receive a run and eventual move to cable television as a regular series on Cartoon Network's Adult Swim block). Each of these 10-episode programs ran for five minutes.

Many other well-known Warner Bros.-produced series that did not air on The WB, including Friends and The O.C., were also made available on the site. However, the website did not include episodes of two of The WB's most popular shows, Charmed and Felicity, as the distribution rights to Charmed are owned by CBS Television Distribution and Felicity's rights are owned by Disney-ABC Domestic Television. Comcast offers over 1,000 episodes from the Warner Bros. Television library on its video on demand service. While Warner Bros. Entertainment did not promote the site in any multimedia ads, it had drawn about 250,000 unique viewers a month, according to Mindshare's Mr. Chapman, who had been tracking the site. Some of its original material had been offered on partner sites such as MySpace and Facebook. Data compiled by comScore Video Metrix showed that 62% of visitors to the site were female.

The McG-produced original series Sorority Forever premiered on the site on September 8, 2008. By 2012, it had accrued more than 7.3 million views from TheWB.com and partner sites. An original reality series, Rich Girl, Poor Girl from Laguna Beach and Newport Harbor executive producer Gary Auerbach, in which two teenagers from different economic and social backgrounds swap lives (similar in format to Wife Swap and A Walk in Your Shoes), had ranked among the top 100 programs in the teenage category on iTunes since its October 20, 2008, debut. With the full replacement of the CW's original Internet programming efforts with their CW Seed portal, The WB website was shut down in December 2013. The closure of The WB website ended, after more than eighteen years, the usage of the brand name "The WB". However, the legacy of The WB still lives on as of 2019. Various programs that aired on the network air reruns on various cable networks such as MTV2 and TNT. Also, WMJF, a small student-run television station at Towson University just outside Baltimore, Maryland, still uses the same call letters (WMJF – Michigan J. Frog) from when the station was a WB affiliate. A neon likeness of Michigan J. Frog also adorns the façade of former WB affiliate WBNX-TV's studio complex in Cuyahoga Falls, Ohio. Similarly, a large marquee sign of the network's logo that was used in the network's "backlot"-themed idents, promos, and bumpers is still located near storage facilities at the Warner Bros. Ranch Facilities in California, where the network was originally operated.

==== Internet advertising ====
The clothing retailer H&M, not a traditional television advertiser in the United States, sponsored Sorority Forever and had some of its clothing worn by characters in the series. Unilever's Axe brand has sponsored Children's Hospital. Warner Horizon Television executive vice president Craig Erwich, who oversaw TheWB.com, said in regards to these tie-ins "If an advertiser has an interest in a series we have in production, we can work in their products or even adjust our launch dates if they want to tie it in to a special promotion."

== Programming ==
Much, though not all, of The WB's programming during its eleven-year run as a television network was produced by corporate cousin Warner Bros. Television. The network's schedule during its first two seasons – the 1995 midseason (when it inaugurated its initial Wednesday lineup) and the first half of the 1995–96 season (when the network expanded its programming to Sundays) – consisted entirely of sitcoms; the first drama series to debut on the network was the primetime soap Savannah, which debuted in February 1996 and ran for two seasons until its cancellation in February 1997. The WB's first reality series was the American adaptation of Popstars, which ran for two seasons from 2001 to 2003.

In addition to live-action programs, the network has experimented with primetime animated series; Pinky and the Brain was the first such series, airing as part of the network's Sunday lineup from September 1995 to July 1996, before moving exclusively to the Kids' WB Saturday lineup due to low ratings in its prime time slot. Most of the animated projects that aired afterward were adult animation series; the last such attempts being The Oblongs (running for one season in 2001, and was later revived on corporate sister Cartoon Network's Adult Swim block) and The PJs (which moved to the network in 2000 following its cancellation by Fox, and ran for only one additional season on The WB).

The WB also occasionally aired regularly scheduled repeat episodes of first-run series airing on other nights throughout the television season intermittently throughout its history; Sister, Sister was the first WB series to receive this treatment, with repeats of the sitcom's first two seasons (which originally aired on ABC) from August 1995 to August 1996, in addition to the first-run episodes it aired on Wednesday nights (this marked the first time that a network aired reruns as part of its regular schedule – outside of the summer months – since December 1993, when NBC removed repeats of Classic Concentration from its daytime lineup two years after that program's cancellation). From 1998 to 2000, the network also aired episode repeats from the first two seasons of 7th Heaven during the first hour of its Sunday lineup under the title 7th Heaven Beginnings; this concept was revived during the 2002–03 and 2003–04 seasons with Smallville and Gilmore Girls (which aired repeats from their early seasons under the respective titles Smallville: Beginnings and Gilmore Girls: Beginnings). Furthermore, from September 2002 until The WB ceased operations, the network ran a two-hour extension of its Sunday lineup (from 5:00 to 7:00 p.m. Eastern and Pacific Time), known as "EasyView", a block featuring week-behind episode rebroadcasts of select shows from the network's primetime schedule.

Out of all the network's series, 7th Heaven – which by the time it ended, had become the longest-running family drama in television history – was the longest-running series ever to have aired on The WB, having run on the network for ten seasons from 1996 to 2006. The program was beaten by Supernatural as the longest-running series to originate on The WB in the 2017–18 season, when the latter series began its thirteenth season (7th Heaven ran for an additional season on The CW from 2006 to 2007; while Supernatural aired on The WB for one season from 2005 to 2006, before moving to The CW in September 2006, ending in 2020).

=== Children's programming ===
The WB debuted the Kids' WB children's program block in September 1995; the lineup initially featured a mix of Warner Bros.' most popular children's shows (such as Tiny Toon Adventures, Animaniacs, and later Batman: The Animated Series, all of which originated either on Fox Kids or in syndication) and newer series (such as Freakazoid!, Histeria!, Superman: The Animated Series, Road Rovers, Pinky and the Brain, and Batman Beyond). After the Turner Broadcasting System was acquired by Time Warner in 1996, Kids' WB formed an alliance with Cartoon Network, resulting over time in an increasing number of programs being shared between the block and the cable channel.

In February 1999, Kids' WB began airing the American English dub of Pokémon. The WB acquired the U.S. rights to the Japanese animated series from TV Tokyo earlier that year (from its U.S. premiere in the fall of 1998 up to that point, the show was syndicated); the series ultimately became a widespread pop culture phenomenon with the added exposure on the network. Kids' WB also acquired the English-language dub of Yu-Gi-Oh!, which also saw the type of viewer popularity experienced by Pokémon. Between 2000 and 2005, Kids' WB experimented with some live-action programming, though the block continued to mainly run animated series. A television series adaptation of R. L. Stine's The Nightmare Room debuted on the block in 2001; it was cancelled after one season. It also aired the live-action made-for-TV movie Zolar, as well as the JammX Kids All-Star dance specials.

Logo for Daytime WB.

With Cartoon Network outrating Fox Kids, and The WB sharing more of its children's programming with the cable channel, The WB announced on May 31, 2005, that it would discontinue Kids' WB's weekday afternoon block as it became financially unattractive due to broadcast stations shifting their afternoon target audiences more exclusively to adults by filling the slot with talk shows and sitcom reruns, on the basis that children's viewing options in that time period had gravitated more towards cable television. Kids' WB's weekday programming continued, but with redundant programs and theme weeks until December 30, 2005 (the block began to increasingly promote Cartoon Network's afternoon Miguzi block and the Kids' WB Saturday morning lineup during the transition). The weekday block was replaced on January 2, 2006, by "Daytime WB," a block that featured repeats of sitcoms and drama series formerly aired by The WB and other networks (such as ER, 8 Simple Rules, and What I Like About You); five days later on January 7, the Kids' WB Saturday morning lineup was expanded by one hour.

The Daytime WB block continued on The CW, unofficially renamed The CW Daytime (though occasional on-air promos for the block did not refer to this name, the block was discontinued in 2021 when The CW dropped the weekday 3 PM hour in favor of a Saturday primetime night); The CW also kept the Kids' WB name for the network's Saturday morning children's programming. However, on October 2, 2007, The CW announced that it would discontinue the Kids' WB block, due to competition with youth-oriented cable channels. Kids' WB aired for the last time on May 17, 2008, replaced with a new block programmed in conjunction with 4Kids Entertainment called The CW4Kids (which was replaced by Vortexx on August 25, 2012, after Saban Brands and Kidsco Media Ventures took over programming the block as part of its acquisition of much of 4Kids's program library; Vortexx continued to run until September 27, 2014, before being replaced a week later by One Magnificent Morning programmed by Litton Entertainment). As a result of its distribution deal with The CW, 4Kids produced Saturday morning blocks for two networks during the 2008–09 season, as it already programmed Fox's 4Kids TV block (which was discontinued by that network on December 27, 2008).

Like its parent network, Kids' WB was revived as an online-only network in April 2008. In addition to carrying select previous Kids' WB programs, the site also featured other archived programs to which Time Warner owned or held distribution rights, and programs seen on Cartoon Network and Boomerang. The Kids' WB website was shut down on May 17, 2015, when it was split into three sites: DCKids.com, LooneyTunes.com, and ScoobyDoo.com; the latter two were regrouped into WB Kids Go in July 2016.

== Differences between The WB and the "Big Four" networks ==
=== Scheduling ===
At the time of its shutdown, The WB ran only two hours of primetime network programming on Monday through Fridays and five hours on Sundays, compared to the three Monday through Saturday and four Sunday primetime hours offered by the Big Three networks (unlike The WB, UPN never carried any weekend primetime programming, though it did offer a movie package to its affiliates on weekend afternoons until September 2000, when the latter was replaced with a two-hour repeat block of UPN programs). This primetime scheduling allowed for many of the network's affiliates to air local newscasts during the 10:00–11:00 p.m. (Eastern and Pacific) time period.

The WB never ran network programming on Saturday nights – despite the fact that the network maintained a children's program block on Saturday mornings – allowing affiliates to run syndicated programs, sports, movies or network programs that were preempted from earlier in the week due to special programming, in the 8:00–10:00 p.m. (Eastern and Pacific) time period. The network's Sunday schedule was originally three hours when The WB began programming that night in September 1995, but expanded to five hours (from 5:00 to 10:00 p.m. Eastern and Pacific Time) in September 2002, with the creation of the "EasyView" repeat block (that block was retained by The CW, which initially adopted The WB's scheduling model until it turned Sunday programming over to its affiliates in September 2009).

In comparison to ABC and CBS, The WB also had the fewest hours devoted to daytime programming on weekdays between September 2001 (when the network dropped the weekday morning block of Kids' WB programs) and September 2006, running only two hours of programming each weekday afternoon (compared to 4½ hours on CBS and four hours on ABC) – NBC in comparison ran only three hours of daytime programming each weekday (not counting its morning news program Today) until September 2000, when it scaled back its daytime programming block to two hours. Because of these reasons, the schedules of The WB's affiliates were largely composed of syndicated programming.

=== Affiliate distribution ===
The WB was the only English language broadcast network that historically did not have any owned-and-operated stations. Although Tribune Broadcasting maintained an ownership stake in The WB, its stations in the three largest television markets of New York City (WPIX), Los Angeles (KTLA) and Chicago (WGN-TV) were affiliates of the network since Tribune did not have a controlling ownership interest in the network to allow its stations to be constituted as O&Os (by 2005, Tribune owned 22.5% of the network, while Time Warner held the controlling 77.5% interest). Time Warner did not have a station group of its own at the time (and still does not in the present day); although its Turner Broadcasting System division did own Atlanta independent station WPCH-TV (then WTBS, the local feed of then-superstation TBS) at the time, but it never carried WB programming due to the network's affiliation with WATL, which Tribune Broadcasting had owned from 1999 (when it acquired the station from Qwest Broadcasting, which was part-owned by Tribune) to 2006 (when it sold the station to the Gannett Company, now Tegna, Inc.).

Unlike the other major networks, The WB distributed its programming in markets that did not have enough commercial television stations to support a standalone WB affiliate to cable-only outlets: the superstation feed of WGN-TV (now known as NewsNation and since converted into a general news cable channel) carried the network's programming from January 1995 to October 1999 to make The WB available primarily to areas where it did not yet have a full-time affiliate. While viewers in the Chicago area saw primetime and Kids' WB programming on separate stations until September 2004 (primetime shows on WGN-TV and children's programs on WCIU-TV), the WGN superstation feed carried the WB's entire schedule during the four-year period that it carried the network.

On September 21, 1998, The WB launched The WB 100+ Station Group, an alternate national feed for small and certain mid-sized U.S. markets (generally those within the bottom 110 Nielsen media markets). The service – which transmitted its content via an IBM-developed data server network that digitally transmitted local and national advertisements, promos, station identifications and customized logo bugs to each individual affiliate, with the programming feeds and accompanying data being relayed via satellite and stored to a wireless PC-based system (known as a "station in a box") – was primarily affiliated with cable-only television channels (which were mainly operated by area cable providers), though it was also carried on full-power or low-power stations in some markets. The WB 100+ offered its own master schedule with programs available on the syndication market that were acquired by The WB (including some feature films and infomercials) airing outside of network programming hours; the addition of local advertisements and newscasts were at the discretion of the local distributor. Most of the stations that were part of The WB 100+ Station Group joined The CW Plus after The CW's September 2006 launch, though most of the cable-only affiliates that became part of The CW Plus have since been replaced by or converted into digital subchannels carried by major network affiliates.

Of the network's cable-exclusive affiliates, "WRWB" in Rochester, New York (owned by local cable provider Greater Rochester Cablevision and its operator/successor, WB sister company Time Warner Cable), TVW (Television Wisconsin Network) in Madison, Wisconsin (owned by Morgan Murphy Media, owner of local CBS affiliate WISC-TV) and WT05 in Toledo, Ohio (owned by Block Communications, operator of Toledo-area cable provider Buckeye CableSystem) were not part of The WB 100+ Station Group, having all predated that service's launch. Like the national cable feed, their respective owners handled programming for the three channels, running their own schedule of syndicated programs during non-network hours; this model was maintained by TVW and WT05 under their subsequent affiliations: TVW became a UPN affiliate in 2001 (having been added to a subchannel of WISC the year prior) and a MyNetworkTV affiliate in 2006, while WT05 operated as a CW affiliate from 2006 until its shutdown and replacement by WTVG-DT2 in October 2014. ("WRWB" moved to a subchannel of ABC affiliate WHAM-TV in November 2006, shortly after becoming a CW affiliate.) In certain mid-sized and smaller markets, some of The WB's stations held dual affiliations with another major network – most commonly, UPN (with The WB often serving as the primary affiliation) – if there were not enough television stations to allow both networks to maintain separate affiliates (though this was also the case in a few markets where enough stations were available for a standalone affiliate).

=== News programming ===
News programming on The WB's affiliates was similar to Fox stations at the time in that the quantity of newscasts varied from station to station. Roughly half of The WB's approximately 200 affiliates aired a local newscast in the 10:00–11:00 p.m. Eastern/Pacific (9:00–10:00 p.m. Central/Mountain) time slot at some point during or throughout their affiliations with the network. Fundamentally, the newscast schedules on WB affiliates varied considerably between stations compared to those affiliated with ABC, CBS, NBC and especially Fox. Most WB affiliates generally ran a two-hour morning newscast on weekdays and/or a half-hour or hour-long 10:00 p.m. newscast on Monday through Fridays only or all seven nights of the week; although there were a few larger market stations that maintained in-house news departments that also produced midday newscasts and had morning newscasts that began in the then-traditional 5:00–7:00 a.m. timeslot; early evening newscasts were largely absent on most of these stations.

The WB affiliate body had fewer news-producing stations in comparison to stations aligned with the Big Three television networks (NBC, ABC and CBS) and considerably fewer than Fox (which has only around 70 stations with in-house news departments, with most of its stations outsourcing their news programming to a competitor). When the network launched in January 1995, The WB automatically gained five affiliates with functioning news departments through the initial agreement with Tribune Broadcasting, all of whom founded their news operations as either independent stations or during early affiliations with other networks, such as the DuMont Television Network: WGN-TV in Chicago, WPIX in New York City, KTLA in Los Angeles, KWGN-TV in Denver and WLVI-TV in Boston (a fifth news-producing station owned by Tribune at the time, WGNX in Atlanta, was to become a WB charter affiliate but instead affiliated with CBS after WAGA-TV dropped that network to join Fox in December 1994, through a groupwide affiliation deal between Fox and WAGA owner New World Communications). KPLR-TV in St. Louis (which would not be acquired by Tribune until 2003, when it bought the station from ACME Communications) also continued to produce a 9:00 p.m. newscast as a WB affiliate; while Phoenix, Arizona's KTVK began running expanded newscasts shortly before joining The WB at the network's launch (it had earlier lost the ABC affiliation to KNXV-TV; The WB affiliation moved to KASW, which KTVK began managing under a local marketing agreement upon its sign-on, in September 1995).

In the late 1990s, Tribune asked the company's remaining WB-affiliated stations that did not run newscasts to develop their own news departments; the only stations to do this were KDAF in Dallas–Fort Worth, KHWB in Houston, KSWB-TV in San Diego and WPHL-TV in Philadelphia – the first three debuted their newscasts in 1999, while WPHL had debuted a 10:00 p.m. newscast that was produced in conjunction with The Philadelphia Inquirer in 1994, before WPHL took over production of the program in 1996. KSWB and WPHL would both shutter their news departments in 2005, outsourcing production of their 10:00 p.m. newscasts to NBC owned-and-operated stations in their respective markets (KSWB restored in-house newscasts after it switched from WB successor The CW to Fox in August 2008). KNTV in San Jose became the largest news-producing WB affiliate by market size to be owned by a company other than Tribune (and the only other affiliate of the network to produce early evening newscasts, after KTVK) after it terminated its ABC affiliation, and began carrying WB programming (in a partial simulcast with then-sister station KBWB-TV) in 2000, before affiliating with – and then ultimately being purchased by – NBC in 2002.

Sinclair Broadcast Group also operated several WB affiliates with local news departments: Raleigh's WLFL was the only WB affiliate that the company owned which had an existing news operation at the time it joined the network (WLFL began producing a 10:00 p.m. newscast as a Fox affiliate in 1992, six years before it joined The WB); Sinclair's Tampa, Buffalo, Milwaukee, Cincinnati, and Las Vegas WB affiliates began producing their own newscasts through Sinclair's local/national hybrid news format News Central in the early 2000s. The news departments of all six stations were shut down in 2006 due to companywide cutbacks in Sinclair's news operations and the discontinuance of News Central. Of the former WB affiliates that produced newscasts during their affiliation with the network, only WGN-TV, WPIX, KTLA, KDAF and KIAH (all of whom became affiliates of The CW) continue to maintain self-supporting news departments as of December 2014 (KPLR and KWGN respectively merged their news departments with those of Fox affiliates KTVI and KDVR through a 2008 management agreement between Tribune and Local TV, while WLVI's news department was shut down after Tribune sold the station to Sunbeam Television in 2006, with production of its 10:00 p.m. newscast taken over by new sister station WHDH).

In most markets, the local WB affiliate either outsourced news programming to an NBC, ABC or CBS station in the market (either due to insufficient funds for production of their own newscasts or in later years after the FCC permitted duopolies in markets with at least eight unique station owners in 2000, the station being operated through a legal duopoly or operational agreement with a major network affiliate) or opted to carry syndicated programming in the hour following The WB's primetime programming. As with Fox affiliates, WB-affiliated stations whose newscasts were produced by a same-market competitor tended to have fewer programming hours devoted to news than the station producing the broadcasts.

== Affiliates ==
In 2005, The WB had an estimated audience reach of 91.66% of all U.S. households (equivalent to 90,282,480 households with at least one television set); the network was carried by 177 VHF and UHF stations in the United States. The WB was also available in Canada on cable and satellite providers through affiliates that are located within proximity to the Canada–US border (whose broadcasts of WB shows were subject to simultaneous substitution rules imposed by the Canadian Radio-television and Telecommunications Commission to protect program rights held by a domestically based network), and through two affiliates owned by Tribune Broadcasting (WPIX in New York City and KTLA in Los Angeles) that are classified in that country as superstations, as well as the superstation feed of Chicago affiliate WGN-TV.

=== Station standardization ===
When The WB launched in 1995, the network began branding most of its affiliates with a combination of "WB" or "The WB," and the station's channel number. This meant that, for example, New York City affiliate WPIX and St. Louis affiliate KPLR-TV were both referred to as "The WB11" and "WB11" respectively (though WPIX branded as "The WB, Channel 11" until 1996, and KPLR as its pre-affiliation brand "St. Louis 11" until 1998). Fox originated such naming schemes, and CBS uses similar on-air branding for most of its owned-and-operated stations (NBC and ABC also utilize similar, but less extreme, naming schemes). While Fox and UPN mandated their respective branding schemes on all of their stations, The WB did not. Therefore, other WB affiliates opted to use non-standardized brandings: WGN-TV in Chicago branded as "WGN Channel 9" (or simply "WGN") with The WB's logo placed within the right curve of the station's "9 as an upside-down G" logo after the network launched, and next to a boxed "9" from 2002 to 2006.

Most of the Tribune Company's WB affiliates only used the network's logo within the logos of each station or used the "WB" name after the callsign in its on-air branding (an example was Los Angeles affiliate KTLA, which branded as "KTLA, The WB", after dropping its longstanding and genericized "Channel 5" brand in 1997). Many WB affiliates used another form of standardized branding: the network's Lakeland, Florida, affiliate (serving Tampa) acquired the WWWB call letters and branded on-air as "The WB 32" (it is now known as WMOR-TV). Other stations would take on a 'by city' branding approach (for example, KHWB in Houston was called "Houston's WB", WATL-TV in Atlanta was called "Atlanta's WB", and WLVI-TV in Boston was called "Boston's WB" – all three used the "WB (channel number)" branding prior to incorporating the station's city of primary service during the final years of the network's run); some stations which followed this scheme used a regional name instead of a specific city (such as "Capital Region's WB" for WEWB in Albany, New York, or "Hawaii's WB" for KFVE in Honolulu, Hawaii), while others also incorporated the channel number (such as Philadelphia affiliate WPHL-TV as "Philadelphia's WB17", or Mobile, Alabama, affiliate WBPG as "The Gulf Coast's WB55"). Many stations affiliated with The WB 100+ Station Group also followed either one of these variations on "The City/Region's WB" scheme (though the group's cable-only affiliates also used fictional call signs).

== See also ==
- 2006 United States broadcast TV realignment
- UPN
- DuMont Television Network
- E!, a similarly developed network in Canada, not related to the American cable network
- The CW, the television network that replaced The WB and UPN, created by Warner Bros. and CBS Corporation
