= Block Communications =

American media holding company

Logo of Block/Blade Communications

Block Communications Inc. (also known as Blade Communications) is an American privately held holding company of various assets, mainly in the print and broadcast media, based in Toledo, Ohio. The company was founded in 1900 in New York City when Paul Block, a German-Jewish immigrant who came to the United States in 1885, formed an ad representation firm for newspapers. The Block empire grew to encompass many newspapers on the east coast of the US, however with the Great Depression in the 1930s came the loss of all but three properties: the ad representation firm, the Pittsburgh Post-Gazette, and the Toledo Blade (where Block eventually settled the company upon its purchase in 1927). After Block's death in 1941, his children took over the company. They eventually passed it on to their grandchildren, who continue to operate it to this day. In May 2024, a lawsuit to stop the sale of the company, and over control of it, revealed that Allan Block and John Block each own 25%, while the other 50% is owned by family trusts that benefit family members.

On August 1, 2025, Gray Media announced its planned acquisition of all broadcast television stations owned by Block Communications for $80 million. The sale was completed on May 6, 2026.

On April 14, 2026, The Baltimore-based nonprofit Venetoulis Institute for Local Journalism reached an agreement to buy the Pittsburgh Post-Gazette. The purchase price was not disclosed. The Post-Gazette published its first edition under new ownership on May 4.

== Company holdings ==
=== Newspapers ===
- The Blade (Toledo, Ohio)

==== Cable ====
- Buckeye CableSystem, Inc. (systems in Toledo, Ohio and Sandusky, Ohio, latter officially known as Erie County Cablevision)
- Buckeye Express (High Speed Internet)
- Buckeye Cable Sports Network
- HomeFinder Channel 100 cable (Operated by Block property Buckeye Cablevision)

=== Online ===
- Buckeye Broadband (formerly Buckeye Cablesystem)
- MaxxSouth Broadband (Started in 2014 after purchase of Harron Communications LP., added Ripley Video Cable in 2017)
- Telesystem (formerly Buckeye Telesystem)
- Block Line Systems (Acquired July 2014 and now a division of Telesystem)

=== Non-media ===
- Metro Fiber & Cable Construction Company (a Toledo-based contractor of fiber optic installation)

== Former properties ==
- Pittsburgh City Paper, Pittsburgh, Pennsylvania (closed 2025)
- The Pittsburgh Press (closed 1992)
- Pittsburgh Post-Gazette, Pittsburgh, Pennsylvania (owned from 1927 to 2026)
- The Newark Star-Eagle (now The Star-Ledger), Newark, New Jersey (owned from 1915 to 1939)
- WIIC-TV, Pittsburgh, Pennsylvania (founded by the Pittsburgh Post-Gazette; now Cox-owned WPXI)
- WWSW radio, Pittsburgh (also founded by the Pittsburgh Post-Gazette; now iHeartMedia-owned WBGG)
- WLFI-TV, West Lafayette, Indiana (sold to LIN TV Corporation; now owned by Gray Media)
- Corporate Protection Services (Sold to Guardian Alarm Co. of Toledo which later was sold to Asset Protection Services, Toledo, Ohio)
- The Monterey County Herald, traded to Scripps in exchange for the Pittsburgh Press; now owned by Digital First Media
- Toledo 5, Toledo, Ohio (operated as a cable-only The WB/CW affiliate by Buckeye CableSystem; affiliation, channel slot and programming sold to SJL Broadcasting on September 1, 2013 and moved over-the-air to WTVG-DT2)
- KTRV-TV Nampa-Boise, Idaho (Sold to Ion Media)
- WBKI-TV (1983–2017) Campbellsville/Louisville, Kentucky (CW; owned by L.M. Communications, but operated by Block through WDRB/WMYO through a shared services agreement where WMYO duplicated its channels for the main portion of the Louisville market. Station was sold in spectrum auction and went off-air on October 25, 2017; rights to programming and CW affiliation were sold to Block, which retains WBKI's programming and call sign over WMYO's channel spectrum.)
- WDRB (Fox/Antenna TV; operated by Block property Independence Television along with WBKI)
- WBKI (The CW/Cozi TV/MyNetworkTV/Movies!)
- WLIO (NBC/Fox)
- WOHL-CD (ABC/CBS) – the first single operator in a market to have all four major networks under one roof.
- WPNM-LD Leipsic, Ohio*
- WAMS-LD Minster, Ohio*
- WAND Decatur, Illinois (NBC)
- WFND-LD Toledo, Ohio (Buckeye Cable Sports Network)
