= WNWO-TV =

Television station in Toledo, Ohio

- Toledo, Ohio; United States
- Channels: Digital: 23 (UHF); Virtual: 24
- Branding: NBC 24

Programming
- Affiliations: 24.1: NBC; for others, see § Subchannels

Ownership
- Owner: Sinclair Broadcast Group; (WNWO Licensee, LLC)

History
- First air date: May 2, 1966
- Former call signs: WDHO-TV (1966–1986)
- Former channel numbers: Analog: 24 (UHF, 1966–2009); Digital: 49 (UHF, 2001–2018)
- Former affiliations: Independent (Note: Nominally an independent. WDHO carried ABC, CBS, and NBC programming, all through secondary affiliations.) (1966–1969); United Network (1967); ABC (1969–1995)
- Call sign meaning: Northwest Ohio

Technical information
- Licensing authority: FCC
- Facility ID: 73354
- ERP: 275 kW
- HAAT: 423.5 m (1,389 ft)
- Transmitter coordinates: 41°40′3″N 83°21′22″W

Links
- Public license information: Public file; LMS
- Website: nbc24.com

WNWO-TV (channel 24) is a television station in Toledo, Ohio, United States, affiliated with NBC. Owned by Sinclair Broadcast Group, the station maintains a transmitter facility on Cousino Road in Jerusalem Township. Its studios are located on Woodlands Drive in Maumee.

Channel 24 was the only television station built by entrepreneur Daniel H. Overmyer. It signed on May 2, 1966, as WDHO-TV, Toledo's third local station. It had no primary network affiliation until 1969, when it became the area's ABC outlet, though it aired shows from the major networks not already seen in the market and was the local affiliate for the short-lived United Network, which Overmyer helped start, in 1967. For most of its first 20 years in operation, the station was burdened by Overmyer's other troubled businesses. The sale of his other TV station permits led to a congressional investigation, and Overmyer's heavily indebted warehouse interests experienced financial reverses en route to a bankruptcy reorganization filing in 1973. WDHO-TV was involved in two lengthy bankruptcy cases, during which Overmyer committed bankruptcy fraud and the building housing the news department was repossessed by the First National Bank of Boston, which held station stock as collateral. Drained of resources, channel 24 never adequately competed in the area of news, becoming a distant third to the established stations, WTOL and WTVG.

The station was acquired by Toledo Television Investors in 1986 and immediately renamed WNWO-TV. The new owners tried to improve the station's news department, but met by viewer indifference and continued low ratings, the station cut back to one newscast a day in 1990. In October 1995, the station switched affiliations from ABC to NBC after WTVG, previously the NBC affiliate in Toledo, was purchased by Capital Cities/ABC. The affiliation switch did not immediately serve as an impetus to revitalize the news operation. That changed after Malrite Communications Group acquired WNWO-TV in 1996 and launched a comprehensive effort including building expansion and expanded newscasts. With the exception of a brief time under Raycom Media ownership, the newscasts failed to attract significant ratings. After Raycom Media acquired WTOL in 2006 and sold WNWO-TV to Barrington Broadcasting, the news department withstood a round of layoffs and gradual decreases in headcount, remaining the laggard in local TV news in spite of a relaunch effort in 2011. Barrington's stations were purchased by Sinclair Broadcast Group in 2013; shortly after the purchase, Sinclair entered into a seven-month-long retransmission consent dispute with Buckeye CableSystem that saw most Toledo-area cable viewers lose access to WNWO. After the dispute ended, Sinclair attempted another revamp of the news department, to no avail in raising the station's flagging ratings fortunes. In March 2017, presentation of its newscasts was outsourced to South Bend, Indiana, and local news was discontinued altogether in May 2023.

== WDHO-TV ==
=== A third commercial channel for Toledo ===
In 1954, at the request of the Detroit-based Woodward Broadcasting Corporation, the Federal Communications Commission (FCC) allotted an additional commercial television channel, ultra high frequency (UHF) channel 79, to Toledo. Woodward obtained a construction permit for a station to use the channel two months later, but it was culled in 1960 as part of a wave of cancellations of unused permits for UHF stations.

Because Toledo only had two commercial allocations in the very high frequency (VHF) band, the city continued to only have two commercial stations. In 1962, FCC chairman Newton Minow told the National Press Club that Toledo was one of several cities that could support a third local commercial station but lacked it in large part because the third allocation was a UHF channel. In February 1963, Springfield Television heeded the call and applied for channel 79. Two months later, Producers, Inc. of Evansville, Indiana, and Daniel H. Overmyer of Toledo made competing applications. Springfield suggested the substitution of a lower channel, 17, and consequent shifts in multiple allotments as distant as Mount Pleasant, Michigan, to make room.

In September 1964, Producers and Springfield Telecasting settled with Overmyer, which reimbursed the two firms a total of $17,200 in expenses incurred in their applications. Now unopposed, Overmyer won an initial decision from an FCC hearing examiner in January 1965. At that time, Overmyer Communications, a new division of Overmyer's warehousing operations, began seeking network affiliation and announced its plans to get channel 79 on the air within a year. Later that year, the FCC moved the unbuilt station from channel 79 to channel 24. Overmyer leased office space in Toledo's Commodore Perry Hotel.

After delays due to bad weather, WDHO-TV—named for Daniel Harrison Overmyer—began broadcasting on May 2, 1966. The new station had no primary network affiliation and instead aired shows from all three national networks—ABC, CBS, and NBC—that went unaired in Toledo. These were complemented by some syndicated series and a nightly newscast at 11 p.m. When Overmyer sold his other TV station construction permits—all in major markets—to American Viscose Corporation (AVC) in 1967, WDHO-TV was not included in the sale. Another Overmyer project, the Overmyer Network, was sold to a 14-person investor syndicate and renamed the United Network weeks before it launched on May 1, 1967; the unbuilt stations and WDHO were originally to have been network-owned stations, but WDHO was an affiliate for the United Network's lone month of existence.

WDHO-TV became an exclusive affiliate of ABC on June 15, 1969, the last network and station to partner after WTOL-TV (channel 11) signed with CBS and WSPD-TV (channel 13) aligned with NBC. While WDHO had local newscasts, a fully-staffed news department was not established until 1972; owing to a lack of space, the news department's offices were located in a garage adjacent to their studio building.

=== FCC investigations ===
The sale of Overmyer's construction permits to AVC, along with the Overmyer Network, came as the warehouse chain was in the midst of a cash crunch. The lead contractor for the warehouses owed $18 million to shareholders early in 1967, placing that company in financial distress and resulting in liens on multiple unfinished buildings. The warehouse company's overhead, particularly with $80,000 in monthly airfare from the financial development team, became equally burdensome. Overmyer agreed to guarantee a debt from the contractor, which restricted company funds even further. Overmyer also sold off both the Toledo Monitor and Progress National Bank during this time; both sales were later attributed to this fiscal crisis. The AVC sale was handled as a merger with WPHL-TV in Philadelphia, as AVC created a brand new company in exchange for a $3 million loan to Overmyer; in approving the deal, the FCC waived a proposed rule that limited station group ownership in the top fifty markets.

The FCC's deference on the deal resulted in a lengthy investigation by the House Investigations Subcommittee between December 1967 and August 1968. The commissioners, Overmyer, AVC president Dr. Frank H. Reichel, and five FCC staffers were named as witnesses during the second round of hearings, mainly focusing on the FCC's overall competence and Overmyer's financial qualifications. The Subcommittee's report admonished the FCC for granting Overmyer the construction permits in the first place, suggesting that he failed to supply needed financial information and paperwork and violated the FCC's out-of-pocket expense policy by effectively disguising a $3 million stock payment as a loan. This prompted the FCC to conduct a hearing on the AVC sale to determine if fraud had been committed and to defer WDHO's license renewal.

Administrative law judge Herbert Sharfman, in his initial decision on April 20, 1973, found Overmyer had overstated his total out-of-pocket expenses by $227,000 but ruled there was no direct evidence of maliciousness or fraud. AVC had already sold off the stations purchased from Overmyer after taking almost all of them dark. WXIX-TV in Cincinnati, which was also sold, was the only AVC station to remain on-air continuously. Due to this and Overmyer having paid off the loan in full, the ruling only affected the deferred renewal of WDHO's license. The Broadcast Bureau disagreed with Sharfman's ruling, regarding the financial misrepresentation as a possible character qualification issue as Overmyer still owned WDHO; the FCC review board remanded the case in January 1974 by Overmyer's request, sending it back to Sharfman. Overmyer was cleared by judge Sharfman of the misrepresentation charges in his May 13, 1974, supplemental initial decision, stating there was "a complete failure of the record to inculpate Mr. Overmyer personally, directly or by implication". The FCC Review Board affirmed Sharfman's ruling on August 21, 1975.

=== Bankruptcy and seizure by FNBB ===
In 1971, Overmyer pledged the stock of the subsidiary that held WDHO-TV's license to the First National Bank of Boston (FNBB) as security for a $6 million loan. This and other tactics by Overmyer failed to stabilize his financial position, and he held more than $25 million in debt by 1973. Overmyer's warehouse companies entered Chapter 11 bankruptcy in the Southern District of New York (SDNY) on November 29, 1973. FNBB then sued Overmyer on May 7, 1974; it sought control of 249 shares in WDHO-TV stock, claiming to hold all 500 shares as collateral for the now-defaulted loans that totaled $10.5 million. Overmyer countersued for $200 million, claiming he was forced into insolvency by FNBB. WDHO-TV filed for bankruptcy in January 1976 when FNBB set up an auction for the station's assets, with the station placed under a debtor in possession arrangement. During this time, the news department operated out of a leased double-wide trailer parked next to the studio building, which continued for three years (from 1977 to 1980). It was stated at the time the trailer's use was discontinued and that it was a station decision to end the lease, but later accounts indicated that FNBB repossessed or nearly repossessed the trailer.

The first bankruptcy proceeding for WDHO was dismissed in 1980. On February 6, 1981, the SDNY denied an appeal by Overmyer; WDHO filed for Chapter 11 bankruptcy again, this time in Cleveland, Ohio. FNBB was awarded control of WDHO on March 25, 1981, by the Cleveland court, despite Overmyer's objection that the order violated FCC rules on ownership transfers for licenses. Overmyer was indebted by as much as $22.4 million to FNBB, which regarded the takeover as proper. Prior to the second bankruptcy, WDHO's license was renewed by the FCC after ten years of deferrals; the commission rejected a request by the Broadcast Bureau to review the 1975 Review Board report, noting the antiquity of the AVC sale controversy and Overmyer's status as an "inactive station owner". WDHO staffers reportedly cheered after learning of the takeover by FNBB, as their paychecks under Overmyer often bounced.

Cleveland bankruptcy court judge John Ray, Jr., ruled against Overmyer on September 24, 1982, determining that he and an associate, attorney Edmund M. Connery, engaged in fraud against FNBB. Hadar Leasing Company, an Overmyer subsidiary, purchased broadcast equipment for WDHO and leased it back to the station (and, in effect, FNBB) at falsified rates that benefited Overmyer; leases included spare parts and roof repairs. Hadar also filed a proof of claim of $859,481.80 during the WDHO bankruptcy that was also found to be fraudulent. WDHO staff also agreed to payroll deductions to benefit the United Way in 1980 and 1981, but the money collected was never donated until after FNBB took over. Comparing the fraud to Twyne's Case of 1601, Judge Ray ordered a constructive trust to dispose of all assets belonging to Overmyer, including WDHO, and FNBB seized outright control of the station. FNBB also seized control of a subsidiary nominally in Overmyer's daughter's name that was applying to construct a new television station in Yuma, Arizona. The bank immediately desired to sell WDHO-TV.

== WNWO-TV ==
=== Sale and relaunch ===
FNBB sold WDHO to Toledo Television Investors, Ltd. (TTI) for $19.6 million in June 1985. TTI was owned by I. Martin Pompadur and Ralph Becker, both of New York. Becker and Pompadur had previously teamed to start Television Station Partners, which was formed from the management buyout of Ziff-Davis Broadcasting in 1982. The sale coincided with the SDNY auctioning Overmyer's other assets, including the warehouse adjacent to the WDHO studios. While the sale was closing, Overmyer and Connery were indicted on multiple charges of bankruptcy fraud, conspiracy to commit bankruptcy fraud, and mail fraud; Overmyer was eventually convicted on one charge. The new owners changed the station's call letters to the current WNWO-TV, for Northwest Ohio, on June 1, 1986, two weeks after the sale closed. While the call sign change was soon followed by cost cuts, layoffs, and the discontinuation of weekend newscasts, TTI also set out to expand the Byrne Road studios and fill out the station's numerous management vacancies: the station had no news director or promotions director. Addressing the staff early in 1987, WNWO's newly appointed vice president and general manager likened their situation to General Custer, saying "they could attack in any direction".

In 1990, the station dropped its underperforming 11 p.m. newscast, which garnered a 1% share of the audience—some 4,000 homes. Management opted to broadcast The Arsenio Hall Show, which had been attracting a larger audience at midnight, in its stead. The early news was returned to 5:30 p.m., where it had aired until January 1989, in hopes of attracting a larger audience and based on the station's past relative success with the time slot. Arsenio was replaced in 1993 with The Rush Limbaugh Show; that year, WNWO-TV joined other ABC affiliates in refusing to air the new network show NYPD Blue.

=== Affiliation switch to NBC ===
In October 1994, SJL Inc., the owner of WTVG, agreed to sell it and WJRT-TV in Flint, Michigan, to Capital Cities/ABC for $155 million. The sale agreement followed rumors that SJL was considering switching WJRT-TV from ABC to NBC, in light of an affiliation switch impending in the Flint market. While the deal kept WJRT-TV with ABC, it signaled an affiliation switch in Toledo, where WTVG had been the NBC affiliate. Even though the sale of WTVG closed in late August 1995, an affiliation switch was set for no later than January 29, 1996—the day after Super Bowl XXX, which was carried by NBC—when ABC sent a six-month affiliation termination notice in late July.

WTVG wanted to switch in November, but channel 24 was not ready; WNWO's general manager, Brett Cornwell, sought to have the switch occur on January 1, 1996, but ABC initially rebuffed the deal. The effect of ABC's rejection was to uphold the January 29 date, keeping the Super Bowl on WTVG and depriving channel 24 of advertising revenue. In response, in mid-October, Cornwell began preempting low-rated ABC national news shows, including Nightline and This Week with David Brinkley, in favor of local infomercials and car sales programs that brought in revenue for the station. Shortly after, the stations agreed to switch on October 28, 1995, with NBC loaning satellite dishes to help WNWO make the change.

Shortly before the switch, in September 1995, WNWO moved its newscast from 5:30 to 6 p.m.; while this put it up against the main newscasts from WTOL and WTVG, it satisfied NBC's desire for a local news lead-in to the NBC Nightly News and allowed the station to air the hour-long syndicated talk show Montel at 5 p.m. Even with the change in affiliation, WNWO had no plans to reinstate an 11 p.m. newscast, merely renaming the existing dinner-hour news NBC 24 News.

=== "Building a better station for you": Malrite purchase, news expansion, and sale to Raycom ===
They seem to be a real anomaly. A strong NBC in the '90s should have boosted their news ratings. I'm not aware of another case where the network's fortunes are so strong and the station's newscasts did not follow.

— Dom Caristi, associate professor of telecommunications, Ball State University, on WNWO's ratings performance after 1996

In April 1996, Malrite Communications Group announced its purchase of WNWO from Toledo Television Investors. Malrite already owned two network affiliates in Ohio, WXIX-TV (Fox) in Cincinnati and WOIO (CBS) in Cleveland. It saw an opportunity to improve channel 24's local programming to match the ratings of the highly popular NBC; company director of planning David Maltz declared immediately that an 11 p.m. newscast would be started once Malrite took control. Once the new owners took control of WNWO, they began a physical and personnel expansion. Former Cleveland television newsman Grant Zalba was hired as WNWO-TV's news director, and Malrite broke ground on a 9,000-square-foot (840 m^{2}) expansion of the Byrne Road studios to offer more studio and newsroom space. After an ad campaign declaring "It's no secret that this station has been dead last in local news", the news relaunch debuted on October 16, 1997, with the slogan "Building a Better Station for You". The improved newscast product included a new meteorologist, new news set and graphics, and WNWO's first regular 11 p.m. newscast since 1990. The affiliation switch and revamp failed to meaningfully change the station's news ratings.

Shortly after unveiling the improvements at WNWO, Malrite sold its television stations to Raycom Media in a deal announced in April 1998. The news was a surprise to station staffers and generated considerable uncertainty, particularly as Raycom already owned WUPW (channel 36) and could only keep one of the two stations. Under news director Lou Hebert, who had worked at channel 24 in the late 1970s and returned in 2002, WNWO's newscasts made gains among ratings and critics. The station won a regional Emmy Award for best daily newscast, and it narrowed the gap in total viewership with channels 11 and 13. Momentum was soon lost. Raycom mandated a shift to a more tabloid news presentation. After a story on a local Playboy Playmate inadvertently showed a woman's breast on the cover of a magazine, Hebert resigned. He was replaced by a news director from Cincinnati who lacked experience in the Toledo area; assignment editor Matt Zaleski later told The Blade, "That's when my reaction was, 'My God, I've got a front-row seat to a train wreck.'" Ratings fell in two consecutive ratings surveys in 2005, and morale sank.

During Raycom's ownership, WNWO introduced a digital signal on February 8, 2001.

=== Barrington Broadcasting ownership ===
When I first started there, there were probably 30 people in the newsroom—10 to 12 reporters, veteran anchors. By the time I left I think we had six on-air talent, reporters and anchors. ... But you can only cut so much. You cut the fat, you cut the meat, and you cut the bone, and now you're down to the marrow. What can you do?

— Shenikwa Stratford, WNWO-TV anchor, 2000s

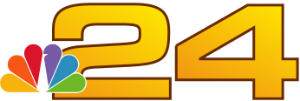
WNWO logo used from 2004 until July 2011

In 2006, Raycom acquired the Liberty Corporation, owner of WTOL. Once more, Raycom was forced to divest one of the two stations. It chose to keep WTOL and sold WNWO-TV, along with a variety of stations in conflicting markets like Toledo and areas outside of Raycom's focus in the Midwest and Southeast, to Barrington Broadcasting. Under Barrington, WNWO continued to sorely underperform; in 2009, at the height of the Great Recession, Barrington conducted a round of layoffs. That same year, the station shut off its analog signal.

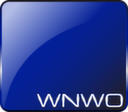
WNWO's logo from 2011 to 2014

The station replaced its existing logo and "NBC 24" brand, used since the 1996 affiliation switch, in 2011 with a blue square containing the letters WNWO. The new logo was paired with cosmetic changes to the news operation. Interim general manager Ben Tucker, who had been brought back to Toledo in an attempt to boost ratings and morale, noted that the station had struggled with extreme turnover. He counted 25 general managers and 30 to 40 news directors over a 30-year period. In 2013, Jim Blue, a veteran Toledo anchorman who had previously worked at channel 24 from 2002 to 2008, returned to anchor WNWO-TV's 6 p.m. newscast.

=== Sinclair ownership ===
On February 28, 2013, Barrington Broadcasting announced the sale of its entire group, including WNWO-TV, to Sinclair Broadcast Group; the sale was completed on November 25.

Shortly after the sale was completed, Sinclair and Buckeye CableSystem, the dominant cable television provider in Toledo, entered into a retransmission consent dispute. Toledo-area cable subscribers lost WNWO-TV on December 15, 2013, as the two sides could not agree on a per-subscriber rate to reimburse the station. Buckeye claimed Sinclair was seeking an increase from 24 cents per month to $2 a month, which Sinclair denied. Sinclair invoked network non-duplication: this forced the system to black out Detroit NBC affiliate WDIV-TV across its Ohio service territory for the duration of the dispute, which included the 2014 Winter Olympics, aired by NBC. Buckeye distributed 17,000 antennas to customers to receive WNWO-TV's broadcast signal. The station was restored on July 14, 2014, ending the dispute after seven months.

During the dispute, Sinclair installed a new management team for WNWO-TV with a new general manager, news director, general sales manager, digital content manager, and promotions director. All five came from WPTA in Fort Wayne, Indiana. After the dispute ended, in August, longtime Toledo news anchor Laura Emerson—who had spent 16 years at WUPW—returned to the market to co-anchor the station's evening newscasts. Over the course of 2014, Sinclair added employees, extended the 5 p.m. newscast to an hour, and introduced an 11:30 a.m. newscast.

In spite of these changes, WNWO-TV's news offering remained low-rated and was progressively downgraded. Sinclair announced in November 2016 that newscasts for WNWO-TV would be produced by the company's WSBT-TV in South Bend, Indiana; a local news staff of 11 would provide reporting for the programs, while redundant staff were laid off. Sinclair stated that these changes would "improve both the news product and production efficiencies". When the changes took effect on March 6, 2017, sports was dropped from the newscasts. The evening anchor team was shared with another newscast produced from South Bend for an out-of-market station: Ryan Cummings and Dayne Marae also presented the local news for WOLF-TV in Scranton, Pennsylvania. Weather segments continued to originate in Toledo. Diane Larson, a former WNWO-TV anchor who became a mainstay at WTVG, later said of the change, "[WNWO-TV] suffered from the fact that everyone knew their anchors were no longer in town, even though they had a couple talented people doing local stories. ... The perception was that they were not a local station anymore."

=== End of local newscasts ===
On May 12, 2023, Sinclair ended local news programming in five smaller markets, including Toledo, with low-rated newscasts. On May 15, WNWO began airing Sinclair's in-house national news program The National Desk in the weekday time slots of the canceled local newscasts at 6:30 a.m., 6 p.m., and 11 p.m.

== Notable former on-air staff ==
- Rick Benjamin – anchor and news director, 1982–1983
- Anna Kooiman – morning anchor, 2007–2008
- Grant Napear – sports anchor
- Allison Payne – intern/reporter
- Michael Reghi – weekend sportscaster, early 1980s
- Paul W. Smith – host of morning shows A New Day and AM Magazine, late 1970s and early 1980s
- Pete Van Wieren – sportscaster, 1972–1974

== Subchannels ==
WNWO-TV's transmitter facility is located on Cousino Road in Jerusalem Township. The station's signal is multiplexed:

Subchannels of WNWO-TV
Subchannel	Res.	Short name	Programming
24.1	1080i	NBC	NBC
24.2	480i	Charge!	Charge!
24.3	480i	Comet	Comet
24.4	480i	ROAR	Roar
24.5	480i	TheNest	The Nest
