= BCSN =

BCSN is a four-letter acronym for two Cable television networks in the United States:

- Black College Sports Network
- Buckeye Cable Sports Network
