= WFND-LD =

Television station in Findlay, Ohio

- Findlay, Ohio; United States
- City: Findlay, Ohio (applied to move to Toledo, Ohio)
- Channels: Digital: 19 (UHF); applied for 30 (UHF); Virtual: 19

Programming
- Affiliations: 19.1: Rock Entertainment Sports Network

Ownership
- Owner: Gray Media; (Gray Television Licensee, LLC)
- Sister stations: WTVG, WUPW

History
- Founded: January 24, 1990
- First air date: February 20, 1992
- Former call signs: W47BD (1990-1997); WFND-LP (1997-2013)
- Former channel numbers: Analog: 47 (UHF, 1992-2003), 22 (UHF, 2003-2013); Digital: 22 (UHF, 2013-2018)
- Former affiliations: Independent (1990−1995); UPN (1995−1999); America One (1999−2015); Youtoo America (2015−2018); Daystar (2003−2018)
- Call sign meaning: Findlay

Technical information
- Licensing authority: FCC
- Facility ID: 21475
- Class: LD
- ERP: 15 kW
- HAAT: 102 m (335 ft); 241.3 m (792 ft) (application)
- Transmitter coordinates: 41°6′41.1″N 83°38′52.7″W; 41°41′0″N 83°24′49″W (application)

Links
- Public license information: LMS
- Website: wfnd-findlay.com

WFND-LD (channel 19) is a low-power television station licensed to Findlay, Ohio, United States. It is owned by Gray Media alongside Toledo-based ABC/CW affiliate WTVG (channel 13) and Fox affiliate WUPW (channel 36). Engineering operations and monitoring are performed from the studios of sister station WLIO on Rice Avenue in Lima.

== History ==
In 2004, the station was acquired from low-power broadcasting giant Equity Broadcasting by Metro Video Productions of Lima. Five years later, the station was purchased by Block Communications of Toledo.

On January 8, 2013, the station made a flash cut to digital channel 22, and is operating with 15 kilowatts of power from a site located at 3800 North County Road 220 in Allen Township, north of the Whirlpool plant.

On June 11, 2018, the station completed its construction permit to move from channel 22 to channel 19. The programming for WFND switched to the Buckeye Cable Sports Network in HD.

On August 1, 2025, Gray Media announced it would acquire all of Block's broadcast television stations, including WFND-LD, for $80 million. The sale was approved by the FCC on May 6, 2026, and completed the same day.

== Subchannel ==
Subchannels of WFND-LD
Subchannel	Res.	Short name	Programming
19.1	1080i	WFND	Rock Entertainment Sports Network
