= Buckeye Cable Sports Network =

BCSN
- Country: United States
- Broadcast area: Toledo, Ohio

Ownership
- Owner: Block Communications

History
- Launched: January 7, 2004

Links
- Website: www.bcsnnation.com

Availability

Terrestrial
- WFND-LD: 19.1

BCSN is a regional sports network founded in 2003 (and first went on the air on January 7, 2004) to carry sports broadcasting, which had previously been aired on fellow cable-only station WT05.

== Overview ==
The station airs Toledo Mud Hens games, BGSU ice hockey and other BGSU sports, University of Toledo sports, high school sports including the Northwest Hockey Conference, college basketball, and other sports games. The network also had broadcast rights to carry the Cleveland Indians. Previously BCSN carried Toledo Storm hockey games from 2004 to 2007 and starting in 2009, the network began carrying every home game of the Toledo Walleye ECHL hockey team.

On April 14, 2011, BCSN began broadcasting some of its sports games in 1080i high definition. All Toledo Mud Hens and Toledo Walleye games are broadcast live in high definition. On August 23, 2012, BCSN began broadcasting its standard-definition channel in a 16:9 letterboxed format.

Several Toledo Rockets football games broadcast on BCSN since 2009 have also been broadcast on WXYZ-TV, Channel 7, in Detroit as lead-in to ABC's college football coverage. Starting in 2014, additional Rockets football games broadcast on BCSN will also be broadcast on WMYD due to that station becoming sister to WXYZ-TV.

On December 13, 2012, BCSN ended a media partnership with CBS-affiliate WTOL because of the level of service performed by the two stations.

On January 7, 2013, BCSN launched BCSN 2.

Beginning in fall 2013, BCSN began a media partnership with ABC-affiliate WTVG, resulting in the largest television sports team in the Northwest Ohio and Southeast Michigan viewing area. The partnership also includes BCSN using the WTVG studios for some of its on-air sports shows.

In 2016, BCSN 2 got regional rights for Columbus Crew SC soccer games because of the limited distribution of Spectrum Sports Ohio in the Toledo market. That agreement ended after the 2018 season, and all regionally televised Crew games now can be seen in Toledo via Bally Sports Ohio and Bally Sports Great Lakes.

In 2018, BCSN began airing its programming over-the-air from a low-power transmitter in Findlay, Ohio on WFND-LD Channel 19.

In 2023, BCSN partnered with the Northern Lakes League to turn BCSN 2 into the NLL Network, which primary airs live games and replays of games from that conference. NLL Network continues to serve as an overflow channel, airing live Toledo Mud Hens games when other action is being featured on BCSN.

BCSN is also the Toledo affiliate of Inside Michigan Football/Basketball, which is also available in Toledo through the program's Detroit affiliate, Bally Sports Detroit, and Buckeye Football/Basketball Weekly.

== On-Air Shows ==
- Sports Nightly
- Local Catch
- Monday Night at the Races
- Your Shape Up
- Rocket Roundup
- BG All-Access
