= WUPW =

Television station in Toledo, Ohio

- Toledo, Ohio; United States
- Channels: Digital: 26 (UHF); Virtual: 36
- Branding: Fox 36; 13 Action News

Programming
- Affiliations: 36.1: Fox; for others, see § Subchannels

Ownership
- Owner: Gray Media; (Gray Television Licensee, LLC)
- Sister stations: WTVG

History
- Founded: August 1, 1983
- First air date: September 22, 1985
- Former channel numbers: Analog: 36 (UHF, 1985–2009); Digital: 46 (UHF, 2003–2020)
- Former affiliations: Independent (1985–1986)

Technical information
- Licensing authority: FCC
- Facility ID: 19190
- ERP: 65 kW
- HAAT: 370 m (1,214 ft)
- Transmitter coordinates: 41°39′22″N 83°26′41″W

Links
- Public license information: Public file; LMS
- Website: fox36.com

WUPW (channel 36) is a television station in Toledo, Ohio, United States, affiliated with the Fox network. It is owned by Gray Media alongside ABC/CW affiliate WTVG (channel 13) and Findlay-based WFND-LD (channel 19). WUPW and WTVG share studios on Dorr Street (SR 246) in Toledo; WUPW's transmitter is located on Corduroy Road in Oregon, Ohio.

WUPW began broadcasting on September 22, 1985, as the Toledo area's first independent station, built by a consortium of Toledo investors including the former president of WDHO-TV. It affiliated with Fox when the network debuted in 1986 and otherwise offered a popular lineup of movies and syndicated programs. In 1993, it was sold to Ellis Communications, under whose ownership WUPW contracted with local CBS affiliate WTOL (channel 11) for a 10 p.m. local newscast beginning in January 1996. The newscast was not as successful in the ratings as comparable programs in other cities. WTOL continued to produce news for WUPW until 2000, when then-owner Sunrise Television brought news production in-house. Under Sunrise and its successor LIN Television, WUPW saw ratings increases and expanded with an early evening newscast at 4 (later 6:30) p.m.

In 2012, WUPW was sold to American Spirit Media, a company that contracted with Raycom Media–owned stations for services. The WUPW news department was folded into that of WTOL, with a morning newscast added to the lineup. American Spirit continued to hold the license and contract with WTOL for services even though, when Raycom and Gray merged in 2019, the merged Gray kept WTVG and divested WTOL to Tegna Inc. In 2026, Gray acquired American Spirit Media outright and merged WUPW's operations into WTVG.

== History ==
=== Construction and early years ===
In 1980, the Federal Communications Commission (FCC) made changes to television station allocations in Toledo, Ohio, following negotiations with Canada. The result was that channels 54 and 60, previously assigned to the city, were deleted and replaced with channel 36. At that time, a non-profit Christian group was raising funds to apply for the channel. That group was not in the field of five applicants that ultimately applied in 1981. Two of the groups had Toledo connections: tvUSA/Toledo, headed by Ed Hanna, and Toledo Telecasting, Inc., a group of local businessmen led by WDHO-TV (channel 24) president Arthur M. Dorfner. The remainder of the field included a firm owned by Malcolm Glazer; the Massachusetts- and Michigan-owned Channel 36, Inc.; and Toledo Family Television, headed by Atlanta businessman John McMullen. The applications were designated for comparative hearing in May 1982, and Toledo Telecasting was selected as the winner in April 1983.

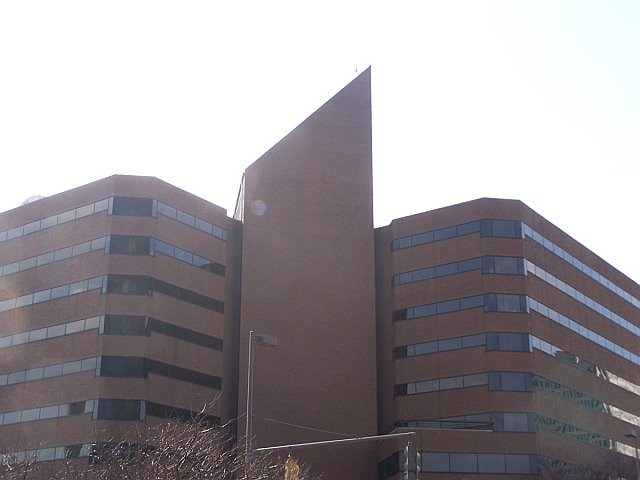
Four SeaGate in downtown Toledo was home to WUPW's studios and offices from 1985 to 2012.

Toledo Telecasting faced delays in construction of the new station, originally designated WDMA, because the firm was waiting on the Internal Revenue Service to rule on whether interest from revenue bonds was taxable. During this time, the call sign was changed to WUPW, and offices were set up at Four SeaGate downtown. Channel 36 began broadcasting on September 22, 1985, as the market's first independent station with movies, syndicated reruns, cartoons, and sports. The new station, which made an immediate mark with its movie lineup, was immediately profitable and joined the Fox network when it launched in October 1986. In November 1986, the original owners filed to sell the station to The Independent Broadcasting Company, owned by Thomas Embrescia.

Bert Ellis, the founder and former president of Act III Broadcasting, launched Ellis Communications in 1993, and WUPW was among its first acquisitions. Under Ellis, the station began investigating the possibilities to start a local newscast. In late 1995, WUPW reached an agreement with WTOL (channel 11) to launch a 10 p.m. weeknight newscast with a high story count and fast pace aimed at younger viewers, utilizing its own anchors and set but sharing resources with WTOL's newscasts. It debuted on January 14, 1996, following NFL playoff football on Fox. The WUPW newscast, known as Fox 36 News at Ten, was a ratings underperformer under WTOL's management; it had new and unfamiliar anchors, and its fast format was described in hindsight by Chris Borrelli of The Blade as "an impersonal, glorified headline service". In May 1997, male anchor Paul Morrison was fired and replaced by WTOL 5 p.m. anchor Jerry Anderson. However, ratings did not improve.

=== Independent news department ===
In the four years WTOL produced the 10 p.m. news for WUPW, channel 36 was sold twice. Ellis Communications was acquired in 1996, and the acquiring firm named itself Raycom Media after Ellis's Raycom Sports syndication division. Two years later, Raycom acquired Malrite Communications, which in Toledo owned WNWO-TV (channel 24). Under FCC rules of the time, Raycom could not keep both stations. It sold WUPW for $73 million to Sunrise Television. With the sale in progress, WTOL's news production contract was extended so as to give Sunrise time to negotiate a new deal, and in May 1999, the two stations agreed on a three-year extension. However, WUPW general manager Randy Pratt expressed a desire to add weekend newscasts, as he felt their absence made it harder for viewers to make it part of their routines, and Anderson was dismissed in May 1999, midway through a sweeps period in which ratings are measured. WUPW also hired its own news director for the first time.

The mixed ratings performance and a desire to have more control over the news product led WUPW to start its own news department in 2000. A studio and newsroom were set up at Four SeaGate, along with the hiring of 20 new employees and a total investment of $2 million. On July 30, 2000, the WTOL-produced Fox 36 News at Ten made way for the WUPW-produced Fox Toledo News, airing seven nights a week. From May 2000 to May 2001, WUPW's 10 p.m. audience share grew from 6% to 10%. That August, the station extended to a full hour plus a five-minute "Fastcast" at 11 p.m. opposite the network affiliates, the latter of which was discontinued after less than two years. In January 2002, LIN Television assumed management duties for WUPW and five other Sunrise-owned stations under a local marketing agreement, months before buying the stations outright.

After eight years of news at 10 p.m., WUPW expanded into a new time slot for the first time on January 5, 2004, with the debut of Toledo's first 4 p.m. newscast. It initially failed to gain traction: that November, Nielsen Media Research found it had insufficient viewership to gain a 1% audience share. However, by 2006, WUPW had more viewers at 4 and 10 p.m. than WNWO did at 5 and 11 p.m., respectively, and the newscast was extended to a full hour. In 2010, the 4 p.m. news hour was switched to a half-hour 6:30 p.m. newscast, at a time when station management believed there was a larger potential audience for a newscast; that September, the station began to offer limited morning news and weather cut-ins in a two-hour programming block of syndicated sitcoms known as The Morning Zone. Laura Emerson, who had been the lead female anchor for WUPW in its entire news history, departed the station in 2012 to work for WPSD-TV in Paducah, Kentucky.

=== Common operation with WTOL ===
On January 11, 2012, it was announced LIN Media would sell WUPW to Charlotte, North Carolina-based American Spirit Media for $22 million. As part of the acquisition, WUPW entered into a joint sales agreement (JSA) with Raycom Media's WTOL. (Note: Raycom bought WTOL and sold WNWO when it acquired the Liberty Corporation stations in 2006.) Three other American Spirit Media stations were located in markets with a Raycom-owned "Big Three" network–affiliated station, and the American Spirit Media stations in all three of those markets were also operated by Raycom through JSAs. The acquisition and joint sales agreement was finalized by the two stations on April 20, 2012. All remaining WUPW staff moved to WTOL's facility, but WUPW's management and sales departments remained separate from their WTOL counterparts. The two stations combined newscasts under the brand Toledo News Now. Two WUPW reporters stayed with the WTOL–WUPW operation, while several WUPW newsroom personnel were hired instead by WTOL's principal competitor, WTVG (channel 13). The newsroom combination resulted in the debut of a 7 a.m. morning newscast on June 11. WUPW spent more than a month off of Buckeye CableSystem, the Toledo area's principal cable television provider, between December 2012 and January 2013 in a retransmission consent dispute. Under the last amendment to the shared services agreement between WTOL and WUPW, WTOL produced a two-hour morning newscast and an hour-long 10 p.m. newscast on weekdays, plus a half-hour 10 p.m. newscast on weekends.

American Spirit continued to hold WUPW's license through two sales of WTOL. In 2018, Raycom merged with Gray Television, owner of WTVG; under FCC rules of the time, it could not keep both stations. It sold WTOL and its agreement with WUPW to Tegna Inc. in a deal completed on January 2, 2019. Nexstar Media Group acquired Tegna in a deal announced in August 2025 and completed in March 2026, though integration action on the merger was later halted by a federal judge.

=== Sale to Gray and duopoly with WTVG ===
On July 1, 2026, Gray announced that it would acquire American Spirit Media's six stations for $50 million; WUPW was the only American Spirit-owned station that was not yet operated by a Gray station. Unlike in 2018, this deal was permissible because of the 2025 federal appeals court decision Zimmer Radio of Mid-Missouri v. FCC, which struck down limitations on one company owning two of the top four stations in a market.

With the sale to Gray, WUPW began airing newscasts from WTVG instead of WTOL effective September 28, 2026. The newscasts included the 7–9 a.m. Action News This Morning; hour-long weekday noon, 4, and 10 p.m. newscasts; and a half-hour weekend 10 p.m. newscast for a total of 21 hours a week of news programming.

== Technical information and subchannels ==
WUPW's transmitter is located on Corduroy Road in Oregon, Ohio. The station's signal is multiplexed:

Subchannels of WUPW
| Subchannel | Res. | Short name | Programming |
|---|---|---|---|
| 36.1 | 720p | WUPW TV | Fox |
| 36.2 | 480i | Bounce | Bounce TV |
| 36.3 | 480i | ION MYS | Ion Mystery |
| 36.4 | 480i | CourtTV | Court TV |
| 36.5 | 480i | ION + | Ion Plus |
| 36.6 | 480i | StartTV | Start TV |

On June 12, 2009, WUPW turned off its analog signal following the digital television transition. The station's digital signal remained at its pre-transition channel 46, using virtual channel 36. WUPW relocated its signal to channel 26 in 2020, as a result of the 2016 United States wireless spectrum auction.
