= Buckeye Broadband =

Telecommunications company in Ohio, USA

- Formerly: The CableSystem; Buckeye CableSystem
- Type: Division
- Industry: Telecommunications
- Headquarters: Toledo, Ohio
- Key people: Allan Block (Chairman)
- Products: Cable TV, Broadband Internet, Dial-Up Internet, WiFi Hotspots, Digital Voice
- Parent: Block Communications
- Website: www.buckeyebroadband.com

Buckeye Broadband (formerly known as the Buckeye CableSystem from August 1996 until May 2016, and as The CableSystem prior to August 1996) is a cable and telecommunications company located in Toledo, Ohio, owned by Block Communications (which also owns The Blade and The Pittsburgh Post-Gazette newspapers). Buckeye Broadband provides cable television, broadband internet and home telephone services to customers in northwest Ohio and parts of southeast Michigan; in addition to its system in Toledo, Buckeye also provides services to Sandusky and Erie County in north central Ohio, which were formerly served by predecessor Erie County Cablevision.

Buckeye Broadband also operates the Buckeye Cable Sports Network (BCSN), a regional sports network focusing on minor league, high school, and college sports events, which launched on January 7, 2004.

== Services ==
Video: Digital Cable TV, Video On Demand, Pay Per View, Whole Home DVR, HD DTA converters and over 100 HD options. Buckeye TV Everywhere: Cable TV customers watch streamed content from various cable TV programmers on Web enabled devices such as computers, smartphones, tablets and more. StreamTV is the latest form of cable service from Buckeye Broadband. It is a form of IPTV and was created in collaboration with TiVo Platform Technologies LLC.

Internet: Multiple High-Speed Internet Plans - Ranging from 100 Mbit/s to 1 Gbit/s speeds over Coaxial Modems and up to 10 Gbit/s over Fiber ONTs. Buckeye Express (BEX) is an email service offered to customers. As of January 17, 2023, new Buckeye Express Emails will not be created in an attempt to phase-out the Buckeye Email service. Customers who already had a BEX email prior to this will keep full access to their email and will continue to receive support.

Phone: Buckeye Phone—3 Phone Plans Available—Digital home telephone service, using a hybrid VoIP

Buckeye Brainiacs: Technical and equipment support technicians for Buckeye Broadband customers. They offer in store repairs and consultation, as well as home visits.

== Carriage disputes ==
=== WUPW ===
On December 12, 2012 at 5 p.m. Fox affiliate WUPW (channel 36) was removed by Buckeye due to a carriage dispute between them and Raycom Media, which had taken over WUPW's operations through a local marketing agreement with Raycom Media's CBS affiliate WTOL (channel 11) earlier in the year, and an increase in retransmission consent fees. The two parties would take over a month to settle their issues, with WUPW returning to Buckeye on January 21, 2013, but by the time the station returned, nearly all of the NFL postseason was over.

=== WNWO ===
Sinclair Broadcasting Group had purchased Toledo NBC affiliate WNWO-TV (channel 24) on November 25, 2013 via a merger with Barrington Broadcasting and immediately went into retransmission consent negotiations with Buckeye, on new terms which Buckeye was unable to agree to; Sinclair ended their consent to carry the station on December 15, 2013 for a long-term blackout of NBC programming in the Toledo market which was considered one of the longest ever of an over-the-air station in the cable industry, despite WNWO's long-known ratings struggles under previous ownerships.

WDIV-TV from Detroit remained available on Buckeye, but with all NBC programming blacked out due to WNWO asserting market exclusivity for NBC programming over the air. QVC was carried during WDIV timeslots with NBC programming, though NBC's on-demand service (which is negotiated separately by the network itself) remained available on Buckeye. However, Buckeye customers in Bedford Township were able to receive WDIV in the clear as Bedford is in the Detroit market.

In the meantime, CBET, the CBC Television station from nearby Windsor, Ontario, Canada was substituted on Buckeye to provide over-the-air coverage of the 2014 Winter Olympics and the 2014 Stanley Cup playoffs via CBC to their customers (Buckeye later "thanked" CBC with a television commercial, sung to the tune of the Canadian national anthem). Cable coverage of both properties on NBCU's cable properties such as NBCSN and CNBC was unaffected by the dispute, as NBCUniversal's carriage agreements for their cable networks were unrelated in whole to the WNWO dispute.

On July 14, 2014, the carriage dispute between Sinclair and Buckeye officially ended with the two parties coming up with a new two-year agreement. As a result of the agreement, Buckeye subscribers in the Toledo area began receiving the WNWO-TV signal once again. CBET, whose standard-definition channel was part of the Buckeye line-up prior to the dispute, had both versions remaining on the system, though relocated to different channel positions.
