= WTVG =

Television station in Toledo, Ohio

- Toledo, Ohio; United States
- Channels: Digital: 13 (VHF); Virtual: 13
- Branding: 13 ABC; 13 Action News; CW 13 (13.2)

Programming
- Affiliations: 13.1: ABC; 13.2: The CW; for others, see § Subchannels

Ownership
- Owner: Gray Media; (Gray Television Licensee, LLC)
- Sister stations: WUPW, WFND-LD

History
- First air date: July 21, 1948
- Former call signs: WSPD-TV (1948–1979)
- Former channel numbers: Analog: 13 (VHF, 1948–2009); Digital: 19 (UHF, 2000–2009)
- Former affiliations: DuMont (secondary, 1948–1955); NBC (primary 1948–1958 and 1969–1995; secondary 1958–1969); ABC (secondary 1948–1958, primary 1958–1969); CBS (secondary, 1948–1958)
- Call sign meaning: Television in the Glass City

Technical information
- Licensing authority: FCC
- Facility ID: 74150
- ERP: 20.1 kW
- HAAT: 306.8 m (1,007 ft)
- Transmitter coordinates: 41°41′0″N 83°24′49″W

Links
- Public license information: Public file; LMS
- Website: www.13abc.com

WTVG (channel 13) is a television station in Toledo, Ohio, United States, affiliated with ABC and The CW. It is owned by Gray Media alongside Fox affiliate WUPW (channel 36) and Findlay-based WFND-LD (channel 19). WTVG and WUPW share studios on Dorr Street (SR 246) in Toledo; WTVG's transmitter is located on Stadium Road in Oregon, Ohio.

== History ==
=== Early years ===
The station signed on the air on July 21, 1948, as WSPD-TV, owned by the locally based Fort Industry Corporation, forerunner of Storer Broadcasting, along with WSPD radio (1370 AM and FM 101.5, now WRVF). The studios were originally located at 136 Huron Street in downtown Toledo. It was Toledo's first television station, and the first television station in the Storer Broadcasting chain.

Originally, the station carried programming from all four television networks: ABC, NBC, CBS and DuMont. However, it was a primary NBC affiliate, owing to its radio sisters' long affiliation with NBC radio. DuMont shut down in 1955, leaving WSPD-TV affiliated with just the big three networks.

In 1958, however, CBS moved its affiliation to newly signed-on WTOL-TV (channel 11), owing to its long affiliation with WTOL radio. WSPD kept its ABC and NBC affiliations. In 1961, WSPD radio moved to new studios in downtown Toledo, where they remain, WSPD-TV's studio building was remodeled within a year. WSPD-TV became an exclusive NBC affiliate in 1969, when Overmyer Broadcasting, then owner of then-independent WDHO-TV (channel 24, now WNWO-TV), persuaded ABC to move its affiliation there. By then, WSPD-TV had become the first station in northwest Ohio to broadcast in color.

Storer also owned WJBK-AM-FM-TV in Detroit and WJW-AM-FM-TV in Cleveland. Both WJBK-TV and WJW-TV were longstanding CBS affiliates. WSPD-TV provided city-grade coverage to most of Detroit's suburbs, while its grade B signal could be seen in Detroit and Cleveland. The Federal Communications Commission (FCC) grandfathered this situation under its "one-to-a-market" rule in the 1970s. Storer sold off WSPD-FM, WJW-FM, and the Detroit radio stations (by then WDEE-AM-FM) in the early 1970s, WJW radio in 1977, and WSPD radio in 1979, but kept channel 13. As a result of an FCC rule in place then that stated that TV and radio stations in the same market could not share callsigns if they had different owners, channel 13 became WTVG on October 1 of that year. By then the studio building on Huron Street had been outgrown and WTVG moved into its current studio building in southwest Toledo on Dorr Street. As with most Storer stations, the studio's facade has a Georgian mansion design, complete with columns.

The Storer stations were taken over by Kohlberg Kravis Roberts & Co. (KKR) in 1985. As a result, WTVG lost its grandfathered protection and was not sold to Gillett Communications along with the other Storer stations in 1987. Instead, it was sold to a local employee/investor group called Toledo Television, Inc. Toledo Television, in turn was bought out by SJL Broadcast Management in 1991.

=== As an ABC-owned station ===
In 1994, New World Communications, which purchased much of the former Storer chain, signed a long-term affiliation deal with Fox that saw most of their stations switching to that network. One of those stations was KSAZ-TV, the CBS affiliate in Phoenix, Arizona; CBS secured a replacement affiliate in the market via a larger deal with Meredith Corporation that also saw Meredith's WNEM-TV, Flint's NBC affiliate, switch to CBS. Rumors emerged of NBC courting SJL about either purchasing WTVG or WJRT-TV, Flint's ABC affiliate, or signing both to a long-term affiliation deal; this led Capital Cities/ABC to purchase both stations for $155 million in October 1994. As a result, WTVG would switch from NBC back to ABC.

Capital Cities/ABC completed its purchase of the stations on August 29, 1995; however, WTVG's NBC affiliation contract did not run out until October. On October 28, 1995, ABC moved to WTVG, sending the NBC affiliation to WNWO-TV.

In 1996, Capital Cities/ABC was acquired by Disney. WTVG was the smallest station in the country that was an O&O of any major network, not counting semi-satellites (this includes WOGX in Ocala–Gainesville, Florida; which is a semi-satellite of WOFL in Orlando).

Because of its status as an O&O, WTVG aired the Veterans Day airing of the film Saving Private Ryan in 2004, while many affiliates preempted it out of fears of being fined by the FCC for indecency in the wake of the Super Bowl XXXVIII halftime show controversy. In fact, Scripps and Sinclair Broadcast Group (who combined owned four ABC affiliates in Ohio, as well as WCHS-TV in Charleston, West Virginia, which serves parts of Southern Ohio, and WXYZ) decided to preempt the film on all of their ABC affiliates. Among the then-seven ABC affiliates in or serving Ohio at the time (Lima and Wheeling, West Virginia, would later gain their own affiliates), this left WTVG and WYTV in Youngstown as the only ABC stations in Ohio to air the film. It was later determined that the movie showing was not a violation of FCC regulations.

ABC News Now was launched in 2004 on digital subchannels of ABC owned-and-operated stations and affiliates. For conversion to digital broadcasting, the station requested to stay on and was assigned Channel 13 by August 2007 and was temporarily assigned Channel 19 for temporary digital broadcast during the transition. ABC Owned Television Stations, including WTVG, launched on April 27, 2009, the Live Well Network in high definition on the station's sub-channels alongside the AccuWeather Channel. WTVG's broadcasts became digital-only, effective June 12, 2009. Digital channel 13 transmits at a lower power than it did on digital channel 19, so in some locations, there has been a reduction in coverage. Many VHF stations are applying to the FCC for power increases to restore their coverage area after moving from UHF back to VHF.

=== SJL Broadcasting ownership ===
On November 3, 2010, Broadcasting & Cable magazine announced that SJL Broadcasting, now owned by the principal owners of Lilly Broadcasting, made an agreement with Disney to buy back WTVG and WJRT, amid speculation that Disney may sell off ABC. Both stations retained their affiliations with ABC. SJL teamed up with a new private equity partner, Bain Capital, whose affiliated offshoot Sankaty Advisors provided the capital for the purchases (which amounted to $16.8 million on WTVG's end of the $30 million deal). WTVG began being owned by SJL Broadcasting again beginning April 1, 2011. On April 12, 2011, the new management dismissed around 20 people from a pre-sale work force of approximately 100—all behind-the-scenes staff—from the station, despite promising earlier that they would make no staff cuts. Similar cuts occurred at WJRT, though cuts there also involved that station's veteran newscasters Bill Harris and Joel Feick.

On January 13, 2011, WTVG filed an application to the FCC to increase its power from 14.6 kW to 16.7 kW. The station granted a construction permit on the power increase on March 7.

=== Sale to Gray Television ===
On July 24, 2014, SJL announced that it would sell WTVG and WJRT again, this time to Gray Television, owner of Lansing, Michigan's NBC affiliate WILX-TV, for $128 million—a value higher than that of their original sale to ABC. Gray also announced its intent to add The CW to WTVG's digital subchannels. The sale was completed on September 15.

On September 1, 2014, WTVG added The CW to its second digital subchannel to replace Live Well Network, acquiring the affiliation and syndicated programming from the previous Toledo 5 cable channel operated by Buckeye Cablesystem, and inheriting its previous cable positions. The move made The CW's programming available over-the-air and in high definition in the Toledo market for the first time since the network's launch.

On June 25, 2018, Gray announced its intent to acquire Raycom Media in order to merge their respective broadcasting assets (consisting of Raycom's 63 existing owned-and/or-operated television stations, and Gray's 93 television stations) under Gray's corporate umbrella, in a cash-and-stock merger transaction valued at $3.6 billion. As such, Gray was able to sell either WTVG or Raycom-owned WTOL, since both stations ranked among the four highest-rated stations in the Toledo market in total day viewership. On August 20, 2018, Gray announced that they would retain WTVG and sell WTOL and its shared services agreement with WUPW to rival broadcaster Tegna Inc., along with KWES-TV in Odessa, Texas, for $105 million. The deal was completed on January 2, 2019.

On July 14, 2021, Gray announced it would sell WJRT-TV to Allen Media Group as part of its larger acquisition of the broadcasting assets of Meredith Corporation. As Gray elected to keep rival station WNEM-TV in the Flint market, the sale separated WJRT-TV from WTVG after 30 years as sister stations. The sale was completed on September 23.

== News operation ==
WTVG presently broadcasts 43 hours of locally produced newscasts each week (with seven hours each weekday and four hours each on Saturdays and Sundays). The station also produced the local discussion programs Bridges and Conklin & Company, which aired Sundays from 11 a.m. to noon in high definition.

WTVG canceled the show Coffee with the Fords on June 19, 2011. The show was hosted by former Toledo mayor Jack Ford and his wife Cynthia. Coffee with the Fords was shown from 12:30 to 1 p.m. on Sundays and was on the air for over four years.

WTVG also airs two special Friday night sports programs, Football Friday showcasing games across northwest Ohio, during the high school football season and Basketball Friday showcasing girls' and boys' games across northwest Ohio during the high school basketball season.

WTVG utilizes the Sony PDW510 XDCAM camcorder. All Toledo stations (WTVG, WTOL/WUPW, and WNWO) use the Jeep Liberty as an ENG vehicle, due to the fact that they were made locally by Chrysler. WTVG also uses other Jeep-brand vehicles.

WTVG operated a 350,000-watt Doppler weather Radar named "Live Doppler 13000 HD". It was discontinued in 2018.

In 2011, WTVG received six Emmy Awards from the Lower Great Lakes chapter of the National Academy of Television Arts and Sciences. WTVG also received over 15 nominations for their news, a record for the station.

In June 2011, news anchors at WTVG began using iPads to read news stories instead of paper. WTVG is the first television station in Toledo to use the technology. WTOL began using iPads in late September 2011.

On April 4, 2012, WTVG announced that longtime chief meteorologist Stan Stachak would retire from the station at the end of May 2012. Stachak had been at WTVG for over 30 years and became the chief meteorologist for the station back in 1980. Stachak had overseen many technological advances during his 32-year tenure, including the addition of Toledo's only Doppler weather radar in 2003. Stachak retired as chief meteorologist on April 20, 2012. Stachak's final broadcast was during the 11 p.m. newscast on May 27, 2012.

On September 13, 2021, WTVG premiered a 4 p.m. newscast. On September 16, 2024, WTVG premiered a 10 p.m. newscast on WTVG-DT2.

=== High definition newscasts ===
On April 13, 2010, WTVG became the last ABC-owned station (as well as the first station in the Toledo market) to have upgraded its news productions to 16:9 widescreen enhanced definition. On July 2, 2010, WTVG became the first news station in Toledo and the ninth ABC-owned station to broadcast its newscasts in high definition. The in-studio cameras are in 720p HD, and field coverage is in widescreen enhanced definition. WTVG began using new HD graphics on January 17, 2012, and began broadcasting high definition commercials in May 2012. WTOL channel 11 began broadcasting their newscasts in high definition on April 21, 2011. WNWO began broadcasting newscasts in 16:9 enhanced definition widescreen on August 15, 2011. WUPW began broadcasting their newscasts in HD on May 31, 2012.

=== Notable former on-air staff ===
- Ryan Burr – sportscaster
- Rob Powers – newscaster and sports director
- Michael Reghi – sports director (1986–1991)

== Subchannels ==
The station's signal is multiplexed:

Subchannels of WTVG
Subchannel	Res.	Short name	Programming
13.1	720p	WTVG HD	ABC
13.2	720p	CW 13	The CW
13.3	480i	MeTV	MeTV
13.4	480i	THE365	365BLK
13.5	480i	ION	Ion
13.6	480i	DABL	Dabl
13.7	480i	WXN	WeatherNation

== See also ==
- Circle 7 logo – WTVG's Circle 13 logo is a derivative of the Circle 7 logo
