= WTOL =

Television station in Toledo, Ohio

- Toledo, Ohio; United States
- Channels: Digital: 11 (VHF); Virtual: 11
- Branding: WTOL 11

Programming
- Affiliations: 11.1: CBS; for others, see § Subchannels

Ownership
- Owner: Tegna Inc., a subsidiary of Nexstar Media Group; (WTOL Television, LLC)

History
- First air date: December 5, 1958
- Former channel numbers: Analog: 11 (VHF, 1958–2009); Digital: 17 (UHF, 2002–2009)
- Former affiliations: NBC (secondary, 1958–1969)
- Call sign meaning: Toledo ("TOL" is also the IATA airport code for Toledo Express Airport)

Technical information
- Licensing authority: FCC
- Facility ID: 13992
- ERP: 26 kW
- HAAT: 305 m (1,001 ft)
- Transmitter coordinates: 41°40′22″N 83°22′47″W

Links
- Public license information: Public file; LMS
- Website: www.wtol.com

WTOL (channel 11) is a television station in Toledo, Ohio, United States, affiliated with CBS. Owned by the Tegna subsidiary of Nexstar Media Group, the station maintains studios on North Summit Street in downtown Toledo; its transmitter is located on Cedar Point Road in Oregon, Ohio.

== History ==
WTOL-TV began broadcasting on December 5, 1958, as a CBS affiliate with a secondary NBC affiliation, sharing it with then-ABC affiliate WSPD-TV (channel 13, now WTVG) until 1969 when WDHO-TV (channel 24, now WNWO-TV) replaced WSPD-TV as the ABC affiliate. WTOL then became exclusively affiliated with CBS. WTOL is also the only station in Toledo to never change its primary affiliation.

The station was originally owned by the family of former area prosecutor and congressman Frazier Reams along with WTOL radio (AM 1230, now WCWA; and FM 104.7, now WIOT). It was sold to Filmways (now part of Amazon MGM Studios) in 1962. The Broadcasting Company of the South, a subsidiary of South Carolina insurer Liberty Life Insurance Company, bought WTOL in 1965 and later changed its name to Cosmos Broadcasting Corporation; WTOL was that company's only station located outside the Southern United States. Liberty reorganized itself as a holding company, the Liberty Corporation, in 1974, and WTOL came directly under the Liberty banner after Liberty sold off its insurance business in 2003.

WTOL's italic "Toledo 11" logo, used from 1980 to 1996. The "11" from this logo is currently in use at former sister station WTOC-TV.

From the mid-1970s to 2003, WTOL was known on-air as "Toledo 11" (sometimes spelled out as "Toledo Eleven"). In December 1994, WTOL replaced Detroit's WJBK on the lineup of Cancom (later Shaw Broadcast Services), which provided American networks to cable and satellite viewers in many areas across Canada (particularly Atlantic Canada and the Prairies). The changeover occurred shortly before WJBK was due to switch its affiliation from CBS to Fox as part of Fox's deal with New World Communications. CBS was unable to sign a new Detroit affiliate (WGPR, now owned-and-operated station WWJ-TV) until mere days before the change, partly because of a deal reached by Scripps which saw WXYZ-TV renew its affiliation with ABC and caused three other stations to switch to the network. As Cancom had to seek regulatory approval several months in advance, it elected to go with WTOL, the largest CBS station closest to Detroit. WTOL was carried by Cancom until 1999, when it was replaced with WWJ-TV. During this time, WTOL was the de facto CBS affiliate for the southern part of the Detroit market, as WWJ-TV was all but unviewable in that area at the time. The station provides city-grade coverage to most of Monroe County and much of southern Wayne and Washtenaw counties, and grade B coverage to most of Detroit itself.

Raycom Media announced its acquisition of Liberty Corporation in 2005. Raycom already owned WNWO, but couldn't keep both because the Federal Communications Commission (FCC) does not allow one entity to own two of the top four rated stations in a single market. It opted to keep the higher-rated WTOL and sold WNWO to Barrington Broadcasting, who acquired that station in 2006.

WTOL's broadcasts became digital-only, effective June 12, 2009. Digital channel 11 transmits at a lower power than it did on digital channel 17, so in some locations, there has been a reduction in coverage. Many VHF stations are applying to the FCC for power increases to restore their coverage area after moving from UHF back to VHF.

On January 30, 2012, WTOL replaced its News 11 Now on 11.2 with MeTV. In January 2012, LIN TV Corporation announced it would sell its local Fox affiliate WUPW to American Spirit Media for $22 million. As most of American Spirit Media's stations are operated as duopolies with a Raycom-owned station in the same market, it was expected that WTOL would establish a joint sales agreement with WUPW. On April 20, 2012, WUPW finalized its acquisition and its shared services agreement with WTOL. WUPW's remaining staff operated from WTOL's facilities (though its management and sales departments remained separate). A shared news site was also unveiled for the two stations, Toledo News Now.

=== Tegna ownership ===
On June 25, 2018, Atlanta-based Gray Television announced it had reached an agreement with Raycom to merge their respective broadcasting assets (consisting of Raycom's 63 existing owned-and/or-operated television stations, and Gray's 93 television stations) under Gray's corporate umbrella, in a cash-and-stock merger transaction valued at $3.6 billion. Because Gray owned WTVG (which the company acquired in 2014 from SJL Broadcasting), and since WTOL and WTVG rank among the four highest-rated stations in the Toledo market in total day viewership, Gray announced that it would retain WTVG and sell WTOL to an unrelated third party, in order to comply with FCC ownership rules; the JSA involving WUPW would be included in the sale of WTOL. On August 20, it was announced that McLean, Virginia–based Tegna Inc. would purchase WTOL and sister station KWES-TV in Odessa, Texas, for $105 million. The deal was completed on January 2, 2019.

Nexstar Media Group acquired Tegna in a deal announced in August 2025 and completed in March 2026.

== News operation ==
As of September 2023, WTOL presently broadcasts 45 hours of locally produced newscasts each week (with seven hours each weekday, three hours on Saturdays and two hours on Sundays).

In October 2011, WTOL was certified by WeatheRate as having the most accurate forecasts for Northwest Ohio and Southeast Michigan.

On January 2, 2014, it was officially announced that longtime evening news anchor Chrys Peterson would be leaving WTOL after nearly twenty years at the station. Peterson decided to leave the station in order to spend more time with her family. Chrys Peterson's final news broadcast was on February 28, 2014, and an hour-long special aired at 8 p.m. in celebration of Peterson's twenty years at WTOL. On April 24, 2014, it was officially announced that Emilie Voss would succeed Chrys Peterson and join Jerry Anderson as the evening anchor on WTOL.

In January 2017, Emilie Voss announced she would leave WTOL after five years. In February, Kristi Leigh (formerly of WNWO, WUPW and WTVG) was named co-anchor of the 5, 5:30, 6 and 11 p.m. broadcasts. In June 2018, Jerry Anderson announced his retirement, with June 15 being his final day on the air. Morning anchor Andrew Kinsey was promoted to the evening shift while longtime reporter and fill-in anchor Tim Miller assumed morning anchor duties as of June 18, 2018. Longtime sports director Dan Cummins, a fixture at WTOL since 1980, also moved to the news desk and is co-anchor of the noon news. Jordan Strack was named the new sports director.

In March 2019, WTOL attracted viral attention for video it posted on Facebook to motivate local high school students heading into their exams, which featured its anchors excessively using slang. The segment received mixed attention, with some observers considering it to be an exaggerated attempt to appeal to the demographic, but others applauding the anchors' willingness to participate in the video. It was quickly removed by the station, but mirrored copies on sites such as Twitter reached as high as 3 million views.

=== Notable former on-air staff ===
- Evan Rosen – author of The Culture of Collaboration and The Bounty Effect: 7 Steps to the Culture of Collaboration
- Steve Hartman

== Subchannels ==
The station's signal is multiplexed:

Subchannels of WTOL
Subchannel	Res.	Short name	Programming
11.1	1080i	WTOL	CBS
11.2	480i	Crime	True Crime Network
11.3	480i	Grit	Grit
11.4	480i	Quest	Quest
11.5	480i	Shop LC	Shop LC
11.6	480i	Get TV	Great
11.7	480i	Nest	The Nest
11.8	480i	Laff	Laff
