= Jackson-Triggs =

Canadian winery

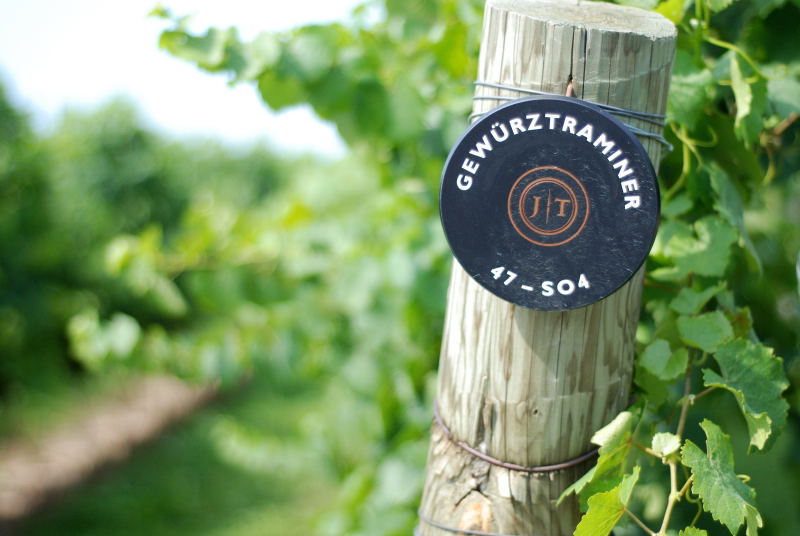
Gewürztraminer row marker at Jackson-Triggs winery

Jackson-Triggs is a Canadian winery with vineyards in the Okanagan Valley, British Columbia and the Niagara Peninsula, Ontario.

In 1989 Donald Triggs, Allan Jackson, with a group of investors, purchased Cartier wines from John Labatt Limited and later changed the company's name to Vincor. In 1993, they began to produce Jackson-Triggs wine. They started with only two varietals, Cabernet Sauvignon and Sauvignon Blanc. Jackson-Triggs now sells many different varieties and tiers including both Vintners Quality Alliance (VQA) wines and ICB (International Canadian Blends, formally known as Cellared in Canada)

Constellation Brands purchased Vincor Canada (including Jackson-Triggs) for CDN$1.52 billion in 2006

In 2006 Jackson-Triggs won the Gold Medal at the International Wine and Spirit Competition (IWSC) for best Shiraz / Syrah; the first Canadian red wine to be recognized by the IWSC. In 2010, they won their seventh "Canadian Wine Producer of the Year" trophy at the IWSC.

In 2016, Constellation Brands sold its Canadian wine holdings, including Jackson-Triggs, to the Ontario Teachers Pension Fund for about $1.03 billion. The company was renamed Arterra Wines Canada in 2017
