= Cellared in Canada =

Category of Canadian wine

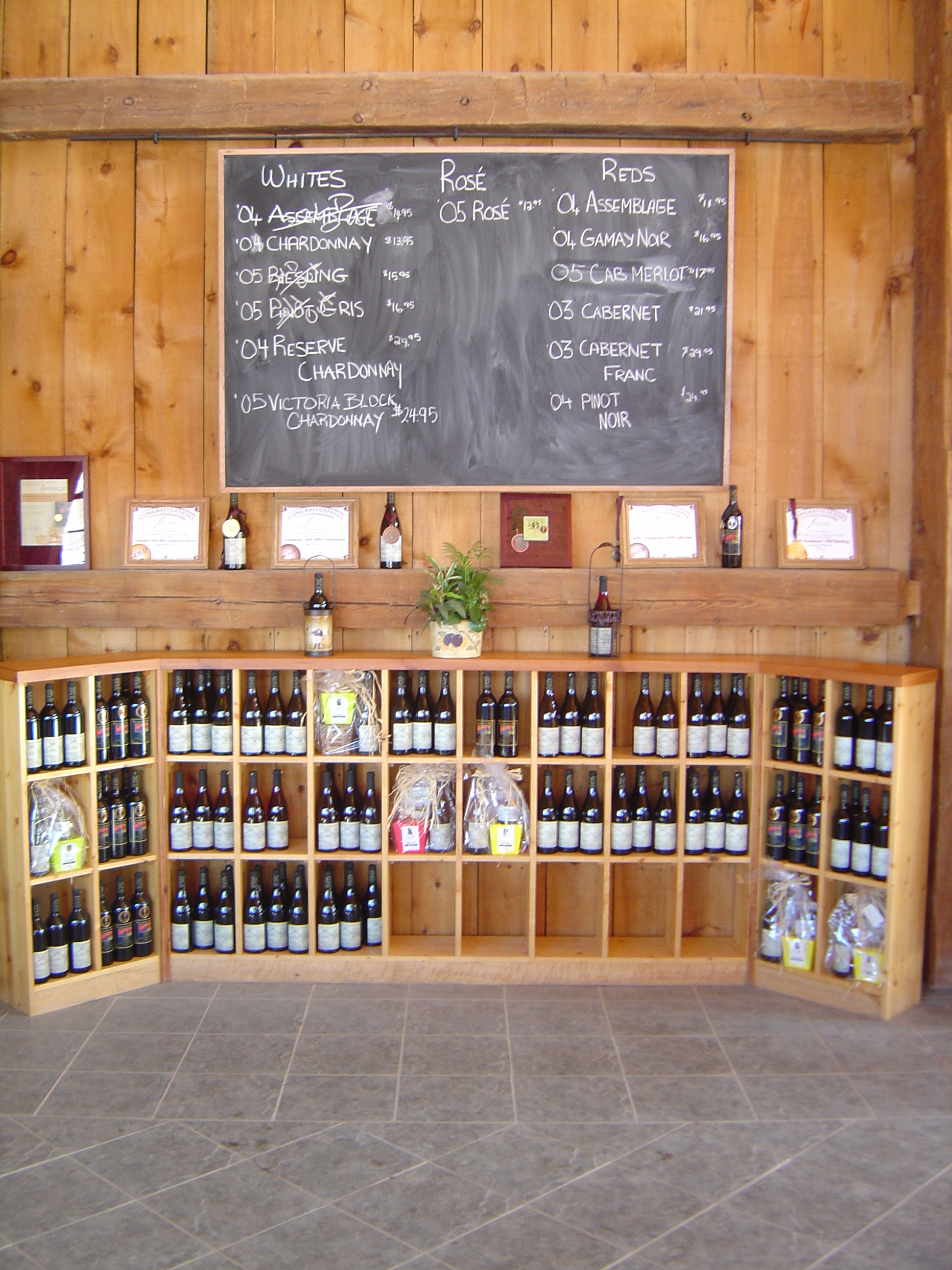
Wine designated as "Cellared in Canada" can be sold in Canadian wine shops as local, domestic wine even though it generally made from foreign grapes.

Depending on the province in which it is produced, Cellared in Canada is a category of Canadian wine that is produced with varying quantities of foreign bulk wine and Canadian wine. These wines are often sold in government-run liquor stores in sections designated as "Canadian wine". In British Columbia, Cellared in Canada wine may be produced from 100 percent foreign content with grapes grown from Washington State, California, South Africa, Argentina, Chile. and possibly even China. In Ontario, Cellared in Canada wine is allowed to be produced from a blend of no more than 60 percent foreign-sourced content. Within the 40 percent Ontario content, dilution with water is not allowed. The only indication of origin is found on the back of the bottle, with a term such as "Cellared in Canada from international and domestic wines". Other permitted terms are "Product of Canada" and "Vinted in Canada".

In Ontario, as of April 1, 2014, the wineries which existed prior to 1993 will be allowed to produce "International - Canadian blends" which contain no more than 75% foreign content (meaning that they in fact contain only 25% Ontario wine, which may be from labrusca varieties). Historically, this percentage has fluctuated wildly, due to periodic shortages and surpluses of Ontario grapes, and lobbying by both the grape growers and the producers.

== Practice ==
Under the "International - Canadian blend" or "Cellared in Canada" name, Canadian wine producers can import pre-fermented grape must from grapes grown in other countries to produce wines under their own wine label. These wines are then designated as being made or "cellared" in Canada, even though they contain a fraction of Canadian-grown grape (or in British Columbia, no Canadian-grown grapes). The advantage to the producer is lower production costs, and higher profit from these wines. Large wine-producing estates such as Jackson-Triggs (owned by Constellation Brands), Peller Estates, Mission Hill Winery, Diamond Estates, Colio, Pelee Island have made widespread use of this designation.

== History ==
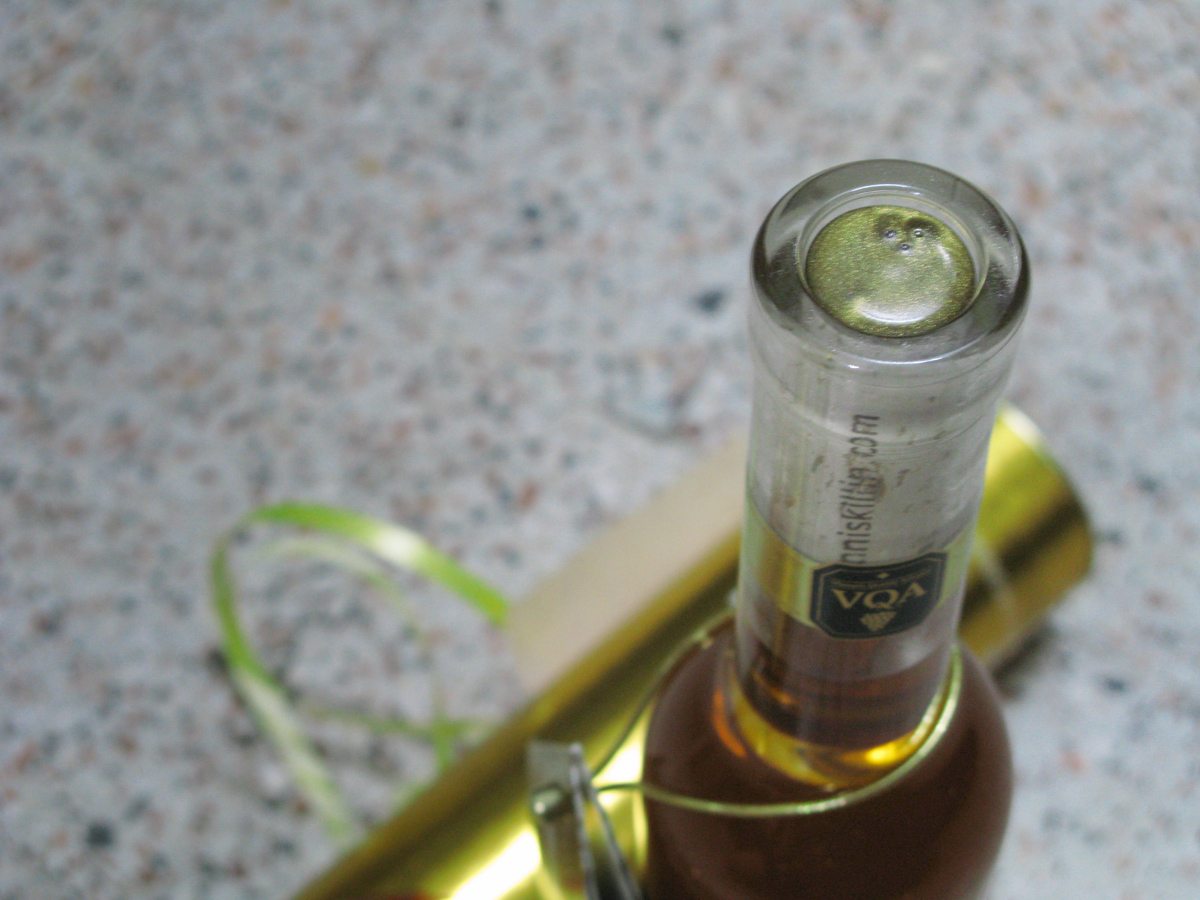
Wines with VQA label are made 100% from Canadian grapes.

The "Cellared in Canada" practice originated in the early years of the Canadian wine industry in the 1980s. During this period grape growers received incentives to pull out existing plantings of Vitis labrusca and replace them with Vitis vinifera, which is more suitable for winemaking. The Canadian government granted permission to wine producers to import from foreign grape sources while they waited for the new V. vinifera plantings to mature and develop. Even as viticulture in Canada continued to expand, with more available sources of local grapes, the practice was permitted as a buffer against the financial impact of inclement weather that could devastate the local crop and cause shortages. Although the original rationale no longer holds true, the practice is still used by large wine companies.

== Criticism ==
In late 2009, local and international criticism of the "Cellared in Canada" practice emerged. Grape growers in Ontario protested the practice as a threat to their livelihood, as thousands of tons of Canadian grapes were left rotting on the vine because producers were using imported grapes to make wine labeled as "Canadian". Wine producers who do not use the "Cellared in Canada" designation criticize the practice as misleading consumers, and tarnishing the reputation of Canadian wines overall.

Producers and growers in Canada have petitioned the government for several changes, such as making the origin of grapes for "Cellared in Canada" wine clearer on the wine label and increasing the visibility of 100% Canadian wines produced by members of the Vintners Quality Alliance (VQA) in province-run liquor stores. As of August 2009, the stores of the Liquor Control Board of Ontario (LCBO) featured less than 2.5% Canadian wine produced by VQA members, with the vast majority of its wines produced under the "Cellared in Canada" designation. In LCBO stores, such wines are required to be under signage which says "International Canadian Blends", although stock is often incorrectly signed.

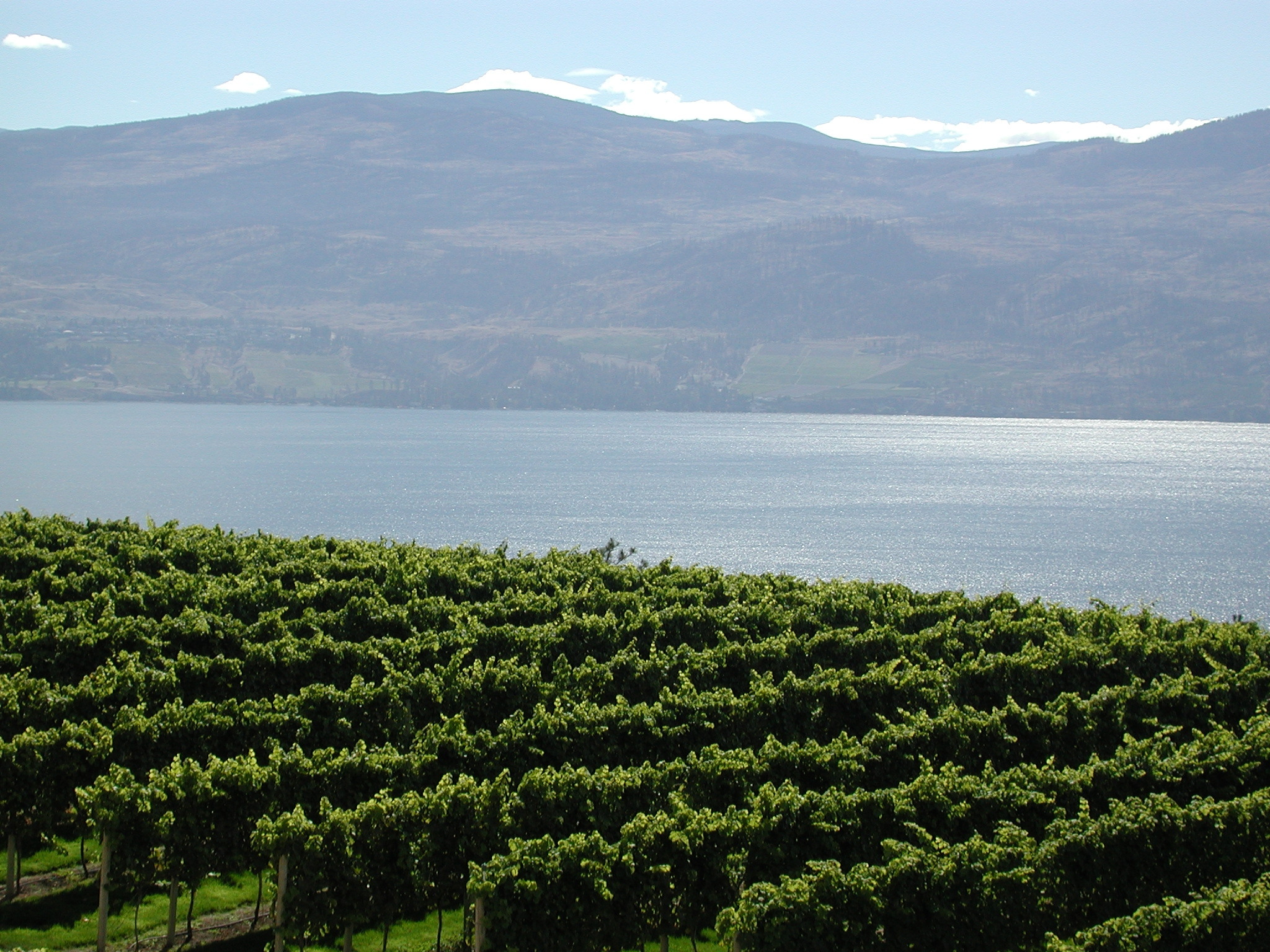
Vineyards at Lake Okanagan in British Columbia.

Wine producers who use the "Cellared in Canada" designation claim that it is a vital business component that allows them to compete in the "under $10" price category. An executive at Arterra, which produces wine in Canada under labels such as Jackson-Triggs and Inniskillin, has claimed that the "Cellared in Canada" practice is a necessity due to the country having too many grapes planted (producing a wine lake effect), with growers charging prices "too high" to be competitive in the market.

== See also ==
- Okanagan Valley (wine)
- Colio Estate Wines
