= Hernder Estate Wines =

Coordinates: 43.1186°N 79.3035°W

- Location: St. Catharines, Ontario, Canada
- Appellation: Niagara Peninsula
- Other labels: The Hernder Picasso Foundation
- Founded: 1988 (1989)
- First vintage: 1991
- Key people: Fred Hernder, Angel Fusarelli, Angela Kasimos (winemaker)
- Parent company: n/a
- Known for: Riesling, Iced Fruit Wines
- Varietals: Vidal blanc, Cabernet Sauvignon, Baco noir, Pinot gris, Chardonnay, Gewürztraminer, Cabernet Sauvignon, Merlot, Cabernet Franc, Fruit wine
- Other products: Grape seed oil, Vinegar, Icewine Jellies, Hot Sauce, Gourmet Sauces

Hernder Estate Wines is a Canadian winery located in Niagara Peninsula, Ontario.

== History ==
The Hernder family is in its third generation of viticulture and is one of the largest family estate winery operations in Canada. Gottfried Hernder emigrated from Germany to Western Canada. In 1939, the family moved to St. Catharines, Ontario, to a mixed fruit farm that included acreage of indigenous grapes. After the passing of his father, Fred Hernder purchased the family farm in 1968, and began the acquisition of others. Fred Hernder began selling grapes, juice, and winemaking supplies to the growing home market as well as wineries.

In the late 1980s Fred Hernder replanted his acreage with classic Vitis vinifera and French hybrid varieties. This launched Hernder Estate Wines. The first vintage in 1991 consisted of 7,000 bottles of Vidal. On September 17, 1993, Hernder Estate Wines officially opened to the public.

== Current production ==
Hernder Estate Wines presently produces more than 25 varieties of V.Q.A. (Vintners Quality Alliance) wines from its 500 acres (2.0 km^{2}) of land spread between St. Catharines and Beamsville. Current plantings focus on traditional Vitis vinifera varieties including Chardonnay, Riesling, Gewürztraminer, Cabernet Sauvignon, Merlot, Cabernet Franc, and Pinot gris. Other varieties include varieties suited to cool climate such as Vidal, Baco noir and Maréchel Foch. Hernder Estate Wines also produces fruit wines and Iced Fruit Wines, utilizing Ontario fruits. All Hernder table wines are produced from 100% Ontario grapes, and all have attained the V.Q.A. status.

== Awards ==
Hernder Estate Wines has won multiple awards from competitions such as Toronto Wine and Cheese Show; Ottawa Wine & Food Show; Chardonnay du Monde; Ontario Wine Awards; All-Canadian Wine Championship; Intervin 2003; and Canadian Wine Awards.
