= Pelee Island Winery =

Winery in Kingsville, Ontario, Canada

Coordinates: 42.0368°N 82.7215°W

Pelee Island Winery is a winery in Kingsville, Ontario, Canada. They cultivate over 700-acre (2.8 km^{2}) of vineyards on Pelee Island, which is in the South Islands Sub-Appellation of the Lake Erie North Shore Appellation of Ontario along the shores of Lake Erie.

At just under 42 degrees North, Pelee Island is at a latitude similar to that of Rioja, Spain; Porto, Portugal; Provence, France; and Tuscany, Italy. It is Canada’s southernmost inhabited spot, and offers a longer growing season than any other Canadian wine region. The island, located in Lake Erie, is 25 kilometres from shore. Harvest is early, with picking usually beginning at the end of August. Late-harvest grapes are often in by mid-October.

== Sustainable Winemaking Ontario ==
Pelee Island Winery has a founding member. It is designated a Sustainable Winemaking Ontario winery and vineyard conforming to standards defined by the World Wildlife Fund. This limits pesticide use and requires a 100% island grown natural fertilizer; sorghum grass.

== Terroir ==
The island offers heat units and frost free days unmatched elsewhere in Canada. Soil type is Toledo clay with a limestone base found two to ten feet from the surface. The soils are highly calcareous indicative of fertility and biological activity. The ideal vineyards are located at the island's centre where deeper soils encourage and ensure properly set root systems, as much of the island is concave and below the surface of Lake Erie. Drainage pipes expel excessive rainfall. This excess water is carried into the island’s century-old dyke system. Winds off the lake ensure consistent air flow through the vineyards, limiting humidity and possible fungus diseases.

== Grapes ==
White varietals include: Chardonnay | Gewurztraminer | Riesling | Sauvignon Blanc | Vidal | Pinot Gris | Tokay Friulano.

Red varietals include: Merlot | Pinot Noir | Cabernet Sauvignon | Cabernet Franc | Baco Noir | Shiraz | Tempranillo | Chambourcin | Gamay | Zweigelt | Lemberger.

== Wines ==
Pelee Island Winery produces over 50 wines, mostly bearing the VQA Ontario mark. Product lines include: VQA Core Line, Reserve VQA, Vinedressers, LOLA, Bella, Hopping Apple Sparkling, Lighthouse, J.S. Hamilton, Monarch and others. White, red, blush, and sparkling.

== Wineries ==
=== Pelee Island Winery Kingsville ===
The winery has a retail boutique, tours and tastings, and an outdoor terrace and banquet facility.

=== Pelee Island Winery Pelee Island ===
Winery pavilion, tours and tastings, large outdoor patio grounds and deli hut.
