= Ontario wine =

Canadian wine produced in the province of Ontario

Ontario wine is Canadian wine produced in the province of Ontario. The province has three official wine-growing regions, the Niagara Peninsula, the north shore of Lake Erie, and Prince Edward County, although wineries also exist in other regions in Ontario. Approximately two-thirds of Canada's vineyard acreage is situated in Ontario, with over 150 vineyards spread across 6,900 hectares (17,000 acres). As a result, the province is the country's largest producer of wine, accounting for 62 per cent of Canadian wine production, and 68 per cent of all Canadian wine exports.

The province is home to Canada's first commercial winery, opened on Pelee Island in 1866. Wineries based in Ontario began to produce ice wine in the early 1980s. In 1999, the Legislative Assembly of Ontario named the Vintners Quality Alliance (VQA) of Ontario as the province's official wine authority.

Grape vine wines constitutes the majority of wine produced in Ontario, with the province also being the world's largest producer of ice wines, a style of grape wine. Grape wines made from 100 per cent Ontario grapes can qualify for classification under Ontario's appellation system, managed by the VQA. Grape wines that are qualified by the provincial wine authority are able to use the descriptor "Ontario wine," in addition with other regulated labelling terms. However, not all wines produced in Ontario are eligible for VQA certification; most notably fruit wines, and wines made from hybrid grapes.

== History ==
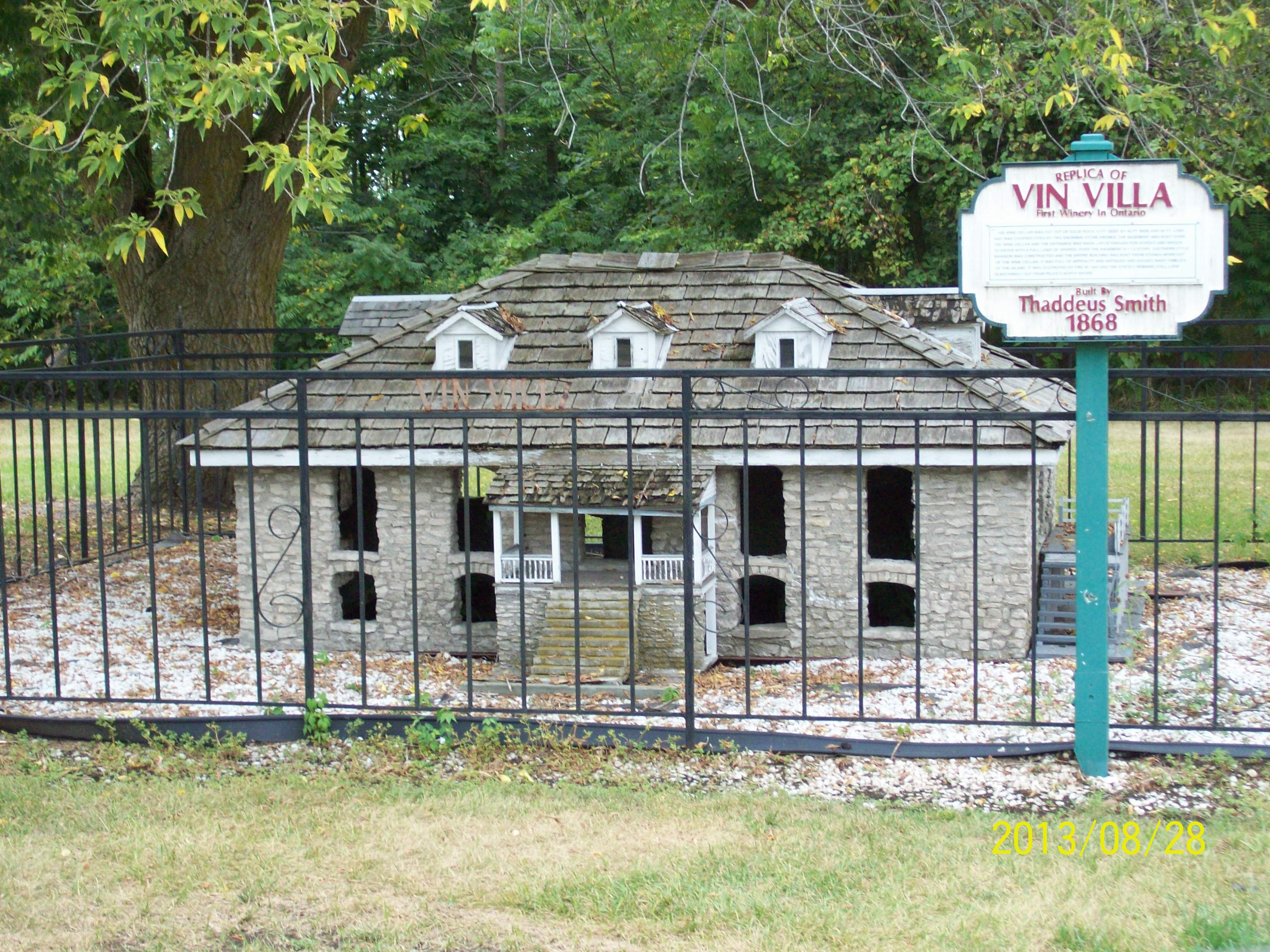
A scale-replica of Vin Villa on Pelee Island, the first commercial winery opened in Canada

The first commercial winery that was established in Canada was in Ontario, on Pelee Island in 1866.

Attempts to produce ice wine in Ontario were first made at Inniskillin in 1983, although a flock of birds destroyed the crop of grapes the day prior to its harvest. Pelee Island Winery was the first Ontario-based winery to successfully produce ice wine, producing 50 bottles of the product in the same year.Malivoire Wine Company on the Beamsville Bench was among the first Ontario wineries certified under the province's Sustainable Winemaking Program and was the first gravity-flow winery in the Niagara region.

In 1999 the Legislative Assembly of Ontario passed the Vintners Quality Alliance Act, 1999, naming the Vintners Quality Alliance as Ontario's official wine authority.

== Growing regions ==
Two-thirds of Canada's vineyard acreage is situated in Ontario; with 150 vineyards spread across 6,900 hectares (17,000 acres). The VQA Ontario Wine Appellation Authority formally recognizes three wine growing areas in the province, the Niagara Peninsula, the north shore of Lake Erie, and Prince Edward County. The VQA also recognizes a number of sub-appellations, or sub-regions within the three official regions. However, wineries also exist outside these regions.

Although each wine growing region has unique characteristics, the three regions do share some characteristics. The soil in the three region is all made of loose gravely soil, laying atop Trenton Limestone, and having been deposited there during the retreat of earlier proglacial lakes, or through earlier glacial events that eroded the surrounding area's bedrock. The gravely soil helps provides drainage of water.

=== Climate ===
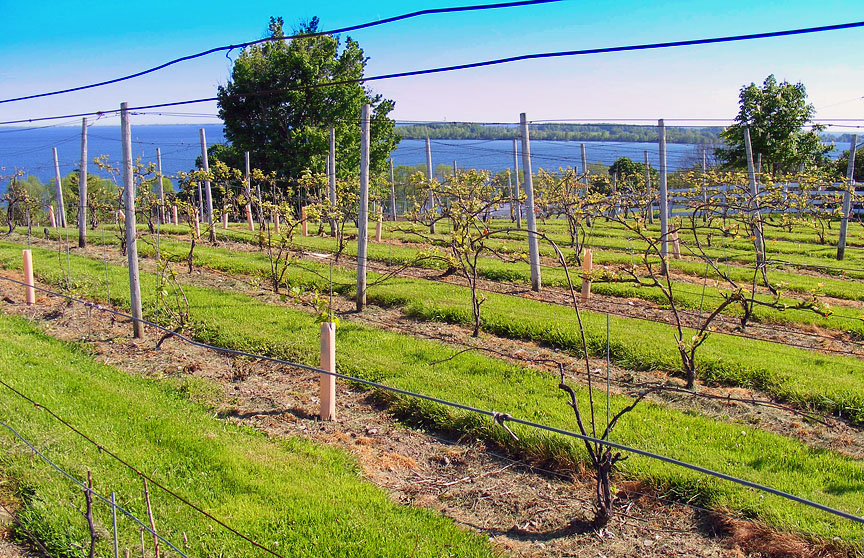
Vineyards adjacent to Lake Ontario in Prince Edward County. The Great Lakes are relied upon to moderate the air's temperature in all three official wine growing regions in Ontario.

Southern Ontario is in roughly the same latitude as southern France (Provence and the Languedoc). These regions have a tradition of growing tender fruit such as apricots and peaches, and has the growing conditions to consistently ripen many varieties of vitis vinifera grapes. All three official wine growing regions in Ontario rely on either Lake Ontario or Lake Erie as a moderator for air temperature.

Grapegrowing in Ontario has its challenges, particularly outside of the southern regions normally associated with tender fruits. At times, wine regions in Ontario suffer from harsh winters which can damage tender vines. In addition, its humid summers can increase the pressure from fungal diseases. However, experience and advancement in technology in recent decades have led to the development of vineyard management techniques (for example, the use of wind machines in vineyards), variety selection and winemaking techniques to meet these challenges.

=== Regions ===
==== Lake Erie's north shore ====
The north shore of Lake Erie is Ontario's most southerly wine growing region, and receives more growing degree days per year than any other wine-growing region in Ontario. However, as opposed to Lake Ontario, Lake Erie is capable of freezing over completely in the winter, which also affects local growth patterns. The region is bounded by Lake St. Clair to the northwest, the Detroit River to the west, Lake Erie to the south, and extends eastward to St. Thomas. The region is made up of small slopes, with an elevation ranging from 172 metres (564 ft) to 196 metres (643 ft), with an average elevation of 185 metres (607 ft). The VQA also recognizes one sub-appellation within it, the South Islands, a group of islands adjacent to the north shore, most notably Pelee Island.

==== Niagara Peninsula ====
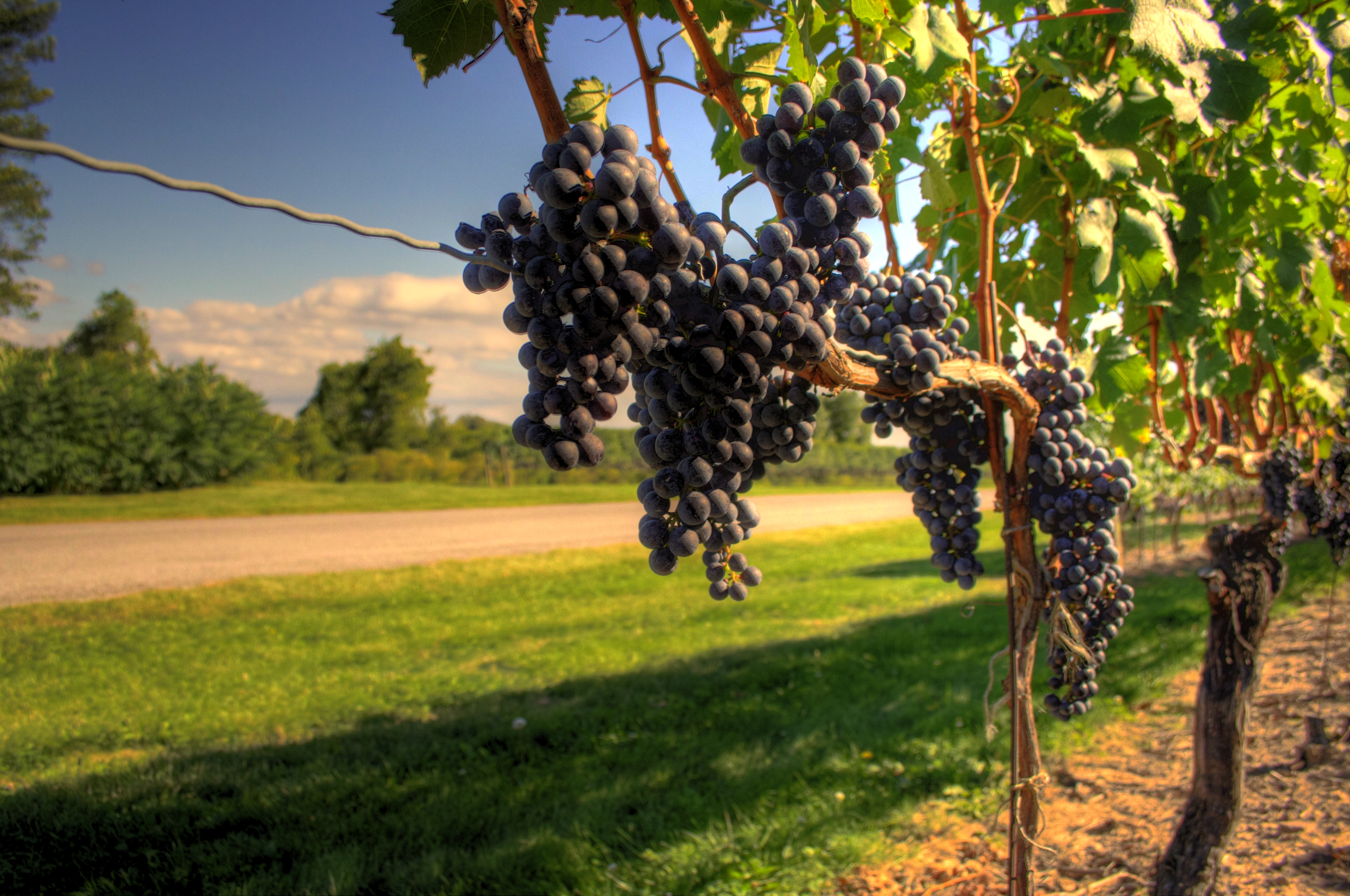
Wine grapes at the Niagara Peninsula, Canada's largest wine growing region

The Niagara Peninsula is the largest wine-producing region in Canada. Spread across 5,500 hectares (13,600 acres) of land, the growing region is the largest viticultural area in Canada. The growing region comprises most of the Niagara Peninsula, bounded by Lake Ontario to the north, the Niagara River to the east, the Welland River to the south, and the city of Hamilton to the west. The Niagara Escarpment is a notable geographic feature of the region, rising 177 metres (581 ft) above sea level, and is used to provide slopes, and elevations, for the cultivation of different wines. As opposed to other regions, the soil of the Niagara Peninsula varies significantly depending on the area. Because of this variation, the VQA recognizes 10 sub-appellations in the Niagara Peninsula.

==== Prince Edward County ====
Located along the northeastern shoreline of Lake Ontario, Prince Edward County was created as a new growing region in 2007. Although the wine region is formally known as Prince Edward County, the wine growing region also encompasses Amherst Island, and a strip of land north of the county. Prince Edward County is Ontario's northernmost VQA recognized wine growing region, and is surrounded by the Bay of Quinte and Lake Ontario, two elements that provide a moderated and cool growing season for that region. The area's soil allows for heat conduction and retention, providing for deeper vine growth in the summer months. Prince Edward County is the only region that has no sub-appellations.

==== Other regions ====
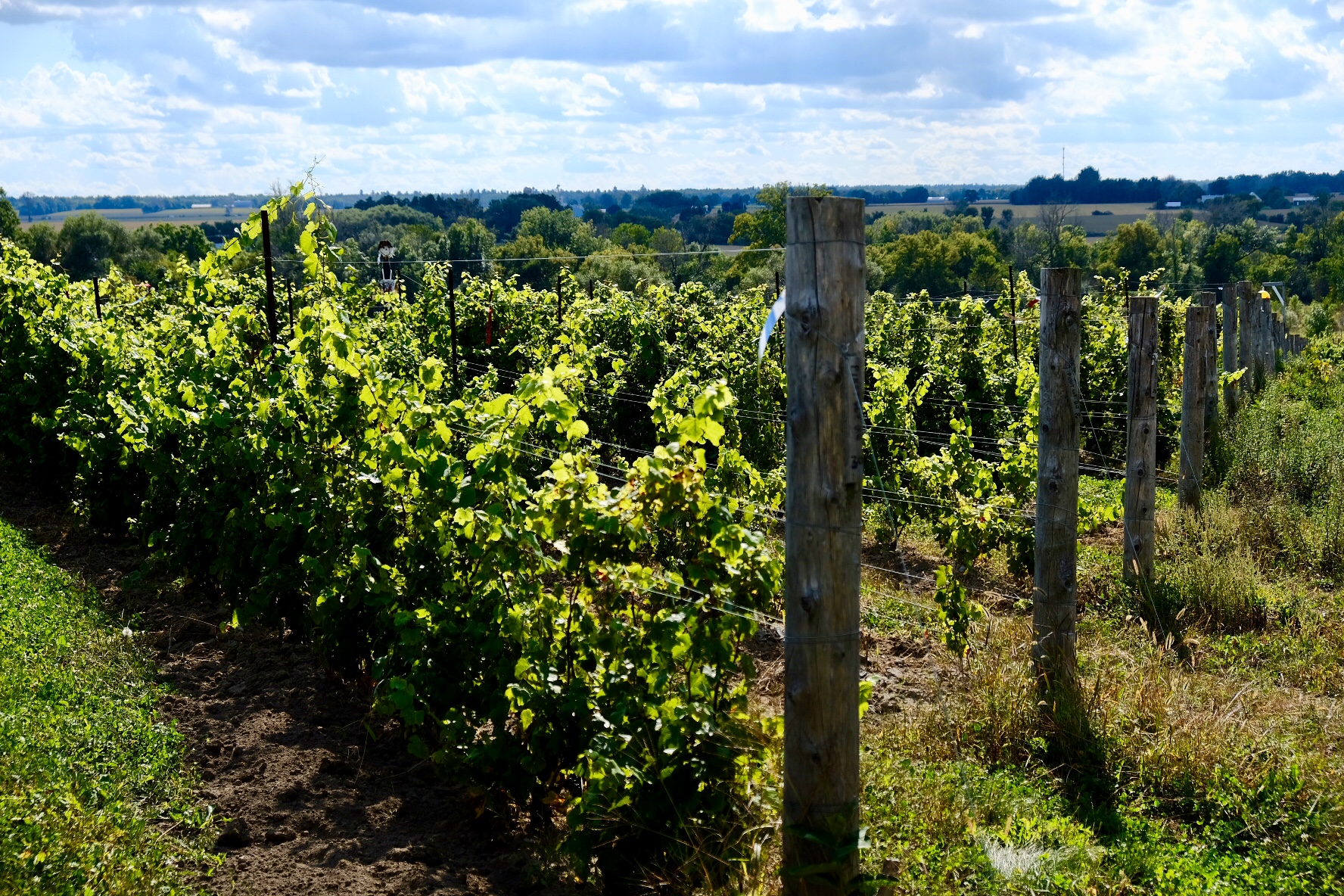
Vineyards in Ottawa. A number of wineries are based outside the three VQA-recognized wine growing areas.

In addition to the three VQA recognized wine growing regions, there have been ongoing smaller scale attempts to grow wine in other, cooler, areas of the province using cold hardy, often hybrid grape varieties, such as Vidal.

Hybrid grapes are primarily grown in Eastern Ontario wineries, better suited for the colder climate of the region. However, the majority of wines grown in these regions are not certified by VQA, as the appellation organization does not certify wines from hybrid grapes. Hybrid grape wines are also grown in Bruce County, which encompasses the northern portion of the Niagara Escarpment, and Norfolk County along the shore of Lake Erie just west of Hamilton.

== Production and styles ==
In 2015, the province accounted for 62 per cent of all wine production in Canada;. with the province accounting for 68 per cent of all wine exports between 2006 and 2011.

The Niagara Peninsula is the largest wine producing region in the country, with 101 wineries in the region producing 2,047,481 nine-litre cases of wine in 2018. Wine from Prince Edward County originates from one of 30 wineries in the region, who produced 31,536 nine-litre cases of VQA wine in 2018. The north shore of Lake Erie is the smallest producer of wine of the three regions in Ontario, with 15 wineries producing 25,462 nine-litre cases of VQA wines in 2018.

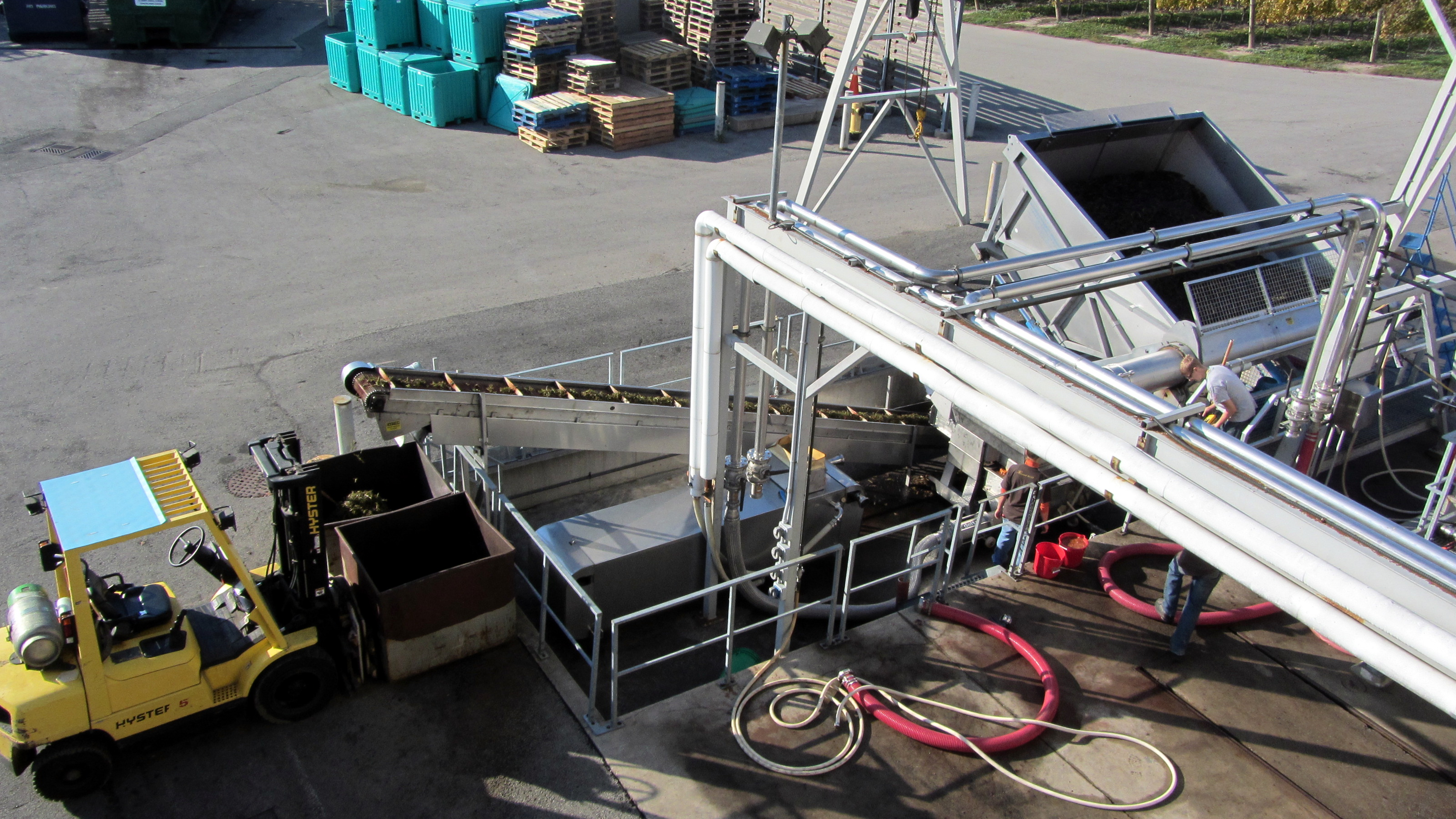
Grapes enter a destemming machine at a Niagara-based winery

=== Grapevine wines ===
The majority of wine production in Ontario is grapevine wine. Vitis vinifera is the most common grapevine grown in Ontario-based vineyards, with a focus on cultivating Chardonnay, Riesling, pinot noir, and Cabernet Franc.

For red wine and rosé production:

- Cabernet Franc
- Merlot
- Pinot noir
- Gamay noir
- Cabernet Sauvignon
- Syrah
- Marechal Foch
- Baco noir
- Petit Verdot
- Malbec
- Zweigelt

For whites:

- Riesling
- Chardonnay
- Pinot gris
- Gewürztraminer
- Viognier
- Sauvignon blanc
- Semillon
- Pinot blanc
- Vidal
- Kerner
- Muscat Ottonel

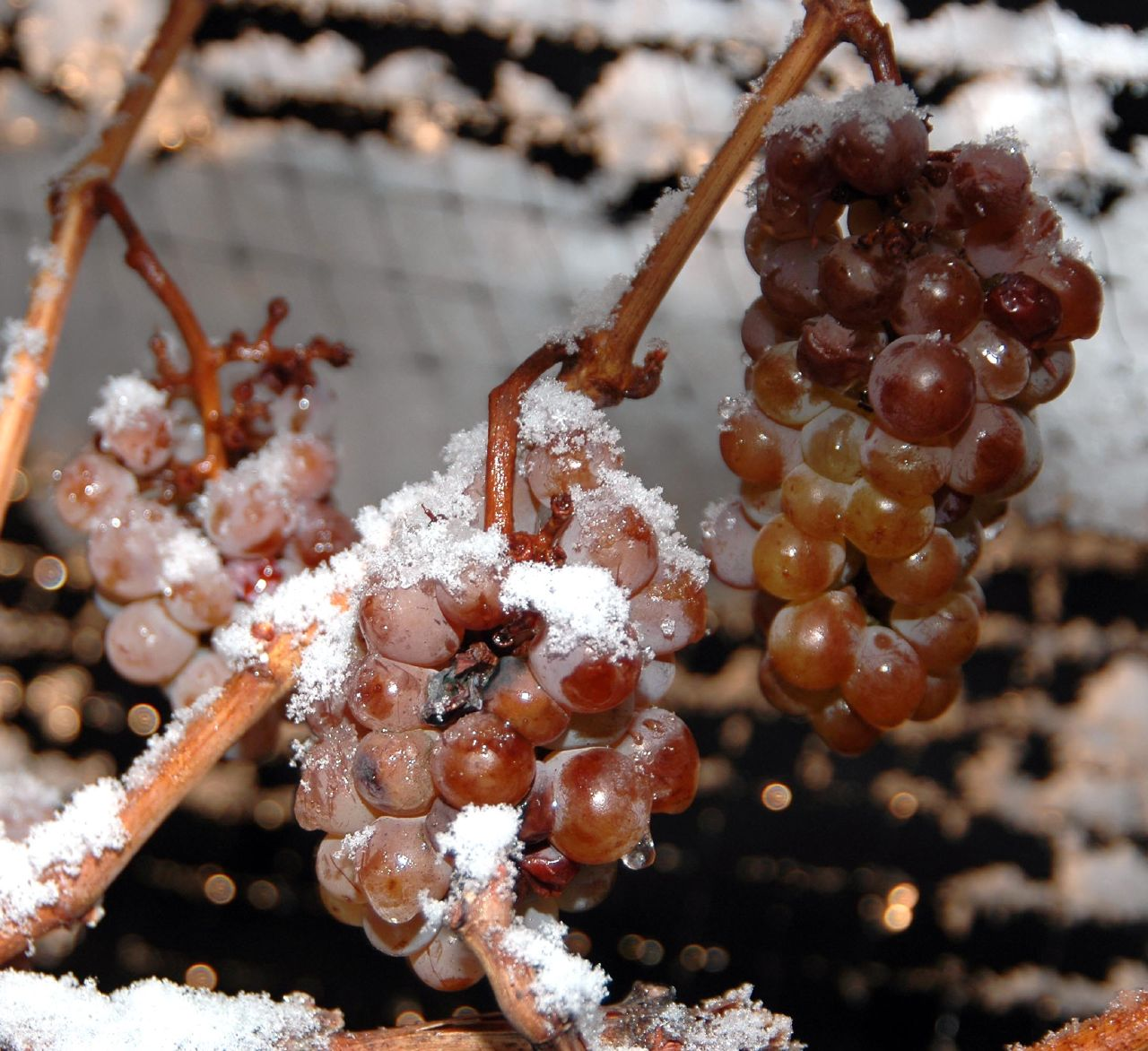
A Niagara-based winery's grapes freezing over. Ontario is the world's largest producer of ice wine.

Ontario is the world's largest producer of ice wine, with wineries in Ontario producing approximately 800,000 litres (210,000 US gal) of ice wine in 2016; As of 2019, the province accounts for approximately 90 per cent of Canada's annual ice wine production. As a result, the province is also the world's largest exporter of ice wine; exporting approximately C$21.3 million of ice wine annually,

Ice wines and late harvest dessert wines includes:

- Vidal blanc
- Riesling
- Cabernet Franc
- Cabernet Sauvignon

=== Fruit wine ===
Ontario is also home to wineries specializing in fruit wine. These wines are outside the scope of the VQA, but Fruit Wines of Canada has developed the Quality Certified (QC) mark to identify quality Canadian fruit wine that is not made from grapes. Ontario-grown fruits used to make these wines include (but are not limited to) apple, apricot, black currant, blackberry, blueberry, cherry, cranberry, elderberry, gooseberry, huckleberry, haskap, nectarine, peach, pear, plum, red currant, raspberry, saskatoon berry, and strawberry.

A Quality Certified mark may be found on fruit wines produced in Ontario

Some fruit wineries carry other products that are not made from fruit, including wines made from rhubarb, maple syrup, and honey. Occasionally fruit wines are combined with grape wine, mead, or other fruit wines to produce unique flavour combinations. In some cases, these wines can include other ingredients such as chocolate (e.g. in cherry or blueberry wines) or spices (e.g. in apple wines).

=== Sake ===
Sake began to be commercially produced on a craft scale in Ontario in 2011. While sake's production methodology and product shelf life are similar to those of beer, its typical alcohol content of 12-19% by volume more closely resembles that of wine made from grapes. Ontario has an advantageous location to produce sake due to the abundant availability of high quality spring water and the large and growing size of its local market for Japanese cuisine. Sake's popularity is also increasing due to its gluten-free and sulfite-free characteristics.

== Wine authority ==
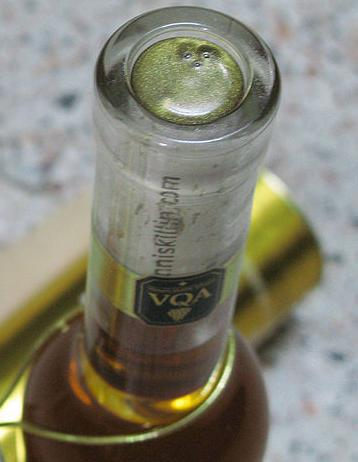
A VQA label on an ice wine bottle from an Ontario-based winery. The label indicates it was produced with 100 per cent Canadian grapes.

The Vintners Quality Alliance of Ontario is formally empowered as the province's wine authority under the Vinters Quality Alliance Act, 1999, helping to classify wines under their appellation system. The VQA regulates production standards including grape varietals, wine-making techniques employed, and other requirements and ensures label integrity for consumers. This has raised some issues with certain wineries that do not meet the VQA standard or are not eligible because they use Ontario grown winter-hardy hybrid grapes that are not recognized by VQA despite lobbying attempts to update their list of acceptable grape varieties.

Not all wines produced in Ontario are classified as VQA. Many wineries produce both VQA wines and non-VQA wines depending on their business objectives. Wines which are not labelled VQA may not meet the VQA standards, certification or verification requirements, or may be wines that are blended with imported grape content. Certain producers (grandfathered under the 1988 Canada-United States Free Trade Agreement) are permitted to produce wines from a blend of foreign grapes or wine and domestic content to produce a wine labelled as Cellared in Canada or International/Canadian Blend. Some in the wine industry are concerned about this practice.

Wines made from Ontario grapes that are not VQA certified are typically wines made using grape varieties, techniques or blends that VQA Ontario does not recognize and are not eligible for certification. Some wineries may choose not to have eligible wines certified by VQA for economic reasons or wines may have failed to pass the certification process. Wines made from fruits other than grapes, including ciders, and wines made from raw materials other than fruit such as Sake and mead are not eligible for VQA certification. The Ontario government provides support to wineries producing VQA wines through mark-up relief for VQA wines sold to restaurants and other establishments licensed to sell alcoholic beverages in Ontario.

== See also ==
- British Columbia wine
- Nova Scotia wine
- Quebec wine
- Short Hills Bench
