= Controlled designation of origin =

Controlled designation of origin may refer to:

- Appellations of origin for wine
- Appellation d'origine contrôlée (AOC), for products of France
- Appellation d'origine protégée:
  - Appellation d'origine protégée (Switzerland) for non-wine products
  - Appellation d'origine protégée, also a term for a protected designation of origin for French products
- Denominação de origem controlada (DOC) of Portugal
- Denominación de origen (DO) of Spain
- Denominazione di origine controllata (DOC) of Italy
  - Indicazione geografica tipica (IGT) of Italy
- Denumire de origine controlată (DOC) of Romania
- Protected designation of origin for the European Union
- American Viticultural Area, for wine of the United States
- Geographical indication, a loose concept of product origin (less restrictive than an appellation of origin)

== See also ==
- Geographical indications and traditional specialities in the European Union – Protected names and designations
