= Quails' Gate Winery =

Coordinates: 49°50′35.24″N 119°33′56.47″W

- Location: West Kelowna, British Columbia, Canada
- Appellation: Okanagan Valley
- Founded: 1956
- First vintage: 1989
- Key people: Jennifer Cudlipp (CEO), Jeff Del Nin (Winemaker), Ben and Tony Stewart
- Parent company: Privately Owned
- Cases/yr: 50,000
- Known for: Stewart Family Reserve Pinot noir & Chardonnay
- Varietals: Pinot noir, Merlot, Cabernet Sauvignon, Old Vines Foch, Chardonnay, Chasselas, Pinot blanc, Riesling, Gewürztraminer, Chenin blanc, Rose, Riesling Icewine, Optima
- Other products: Restaurant, Wineshop
- Distribution: Regional, restaurants & wine club only
- Tasting: Open to public & special events
- Website: www.quailsgate.com

Quails’ Gate Winery is a Canadian Winery located on the shore of Okanagan Lake in Westbank, British Columbia. Situated in British Columbia's Okanagan Valley, Quails’ Gate produces over 50,000 cases of wine per year. Quails’ Gate are best known for their Family Reserve Pinot noir and Chardonnay. Quails' Gate's Wineshop and Old Vines Restaurant are open daily, year round to the public.

== History ==
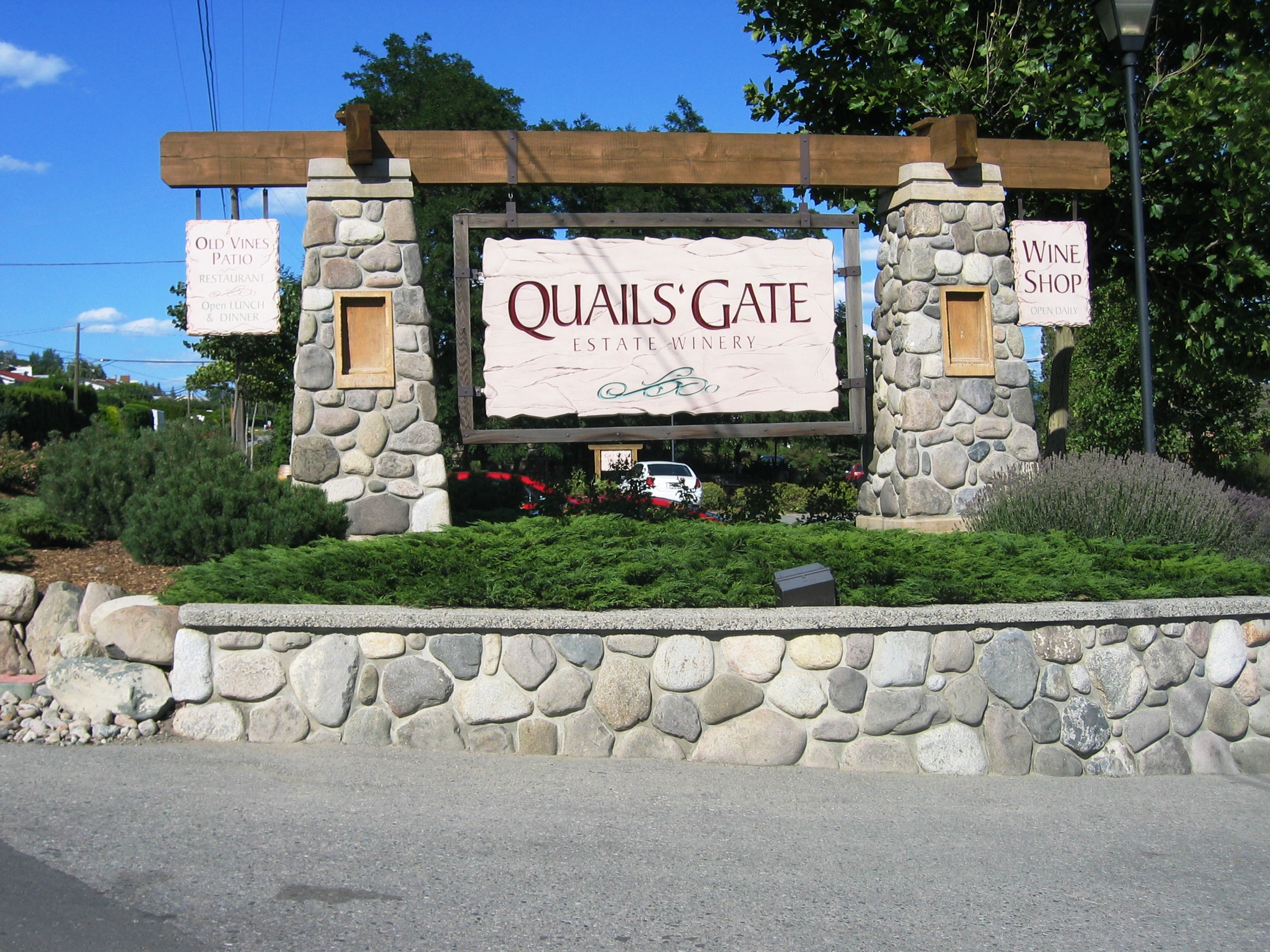
The entrance of Quails’ Gate Winery

Quails’ Gate was founded by the Stewarts, one of the Okanagan’s pioneer horticultural families. Richard John Stewart arrived in the Okanagan Valley from County Kildare, Ireland in 1908. He and his 2 brothers purchased several parcels of land and established nurseries. In 1956, his son Richard Stewart acquired the Allison Ranch on which the winery now sits and started planting vines along with fruit orchards. His son Ben, a banker by trade started working at Quails’ Gate in the 1980s. In 1989, the family abandoned the orchards and focused the properties on producing wine, relaunching the business as Quails’ Gate Estate Winery. In 1992, Richard's other son, Tony, left his career as a stockbroker to return to the family business. Tony now runs the business still privately held by the Stewart family.
