= VQA =

VQA is a three-letter acronym that may refer to:

- Vintners Quality Alliance, a regulatory system for Canadian wines
- .VQA, or Vector Quantized Animation, a file format for video encoding
