= Okanagan Valley (wine region) =

Wine-producing area in British Columbia, Canada

West Kelowna, Okanagan Valley
- Wine region
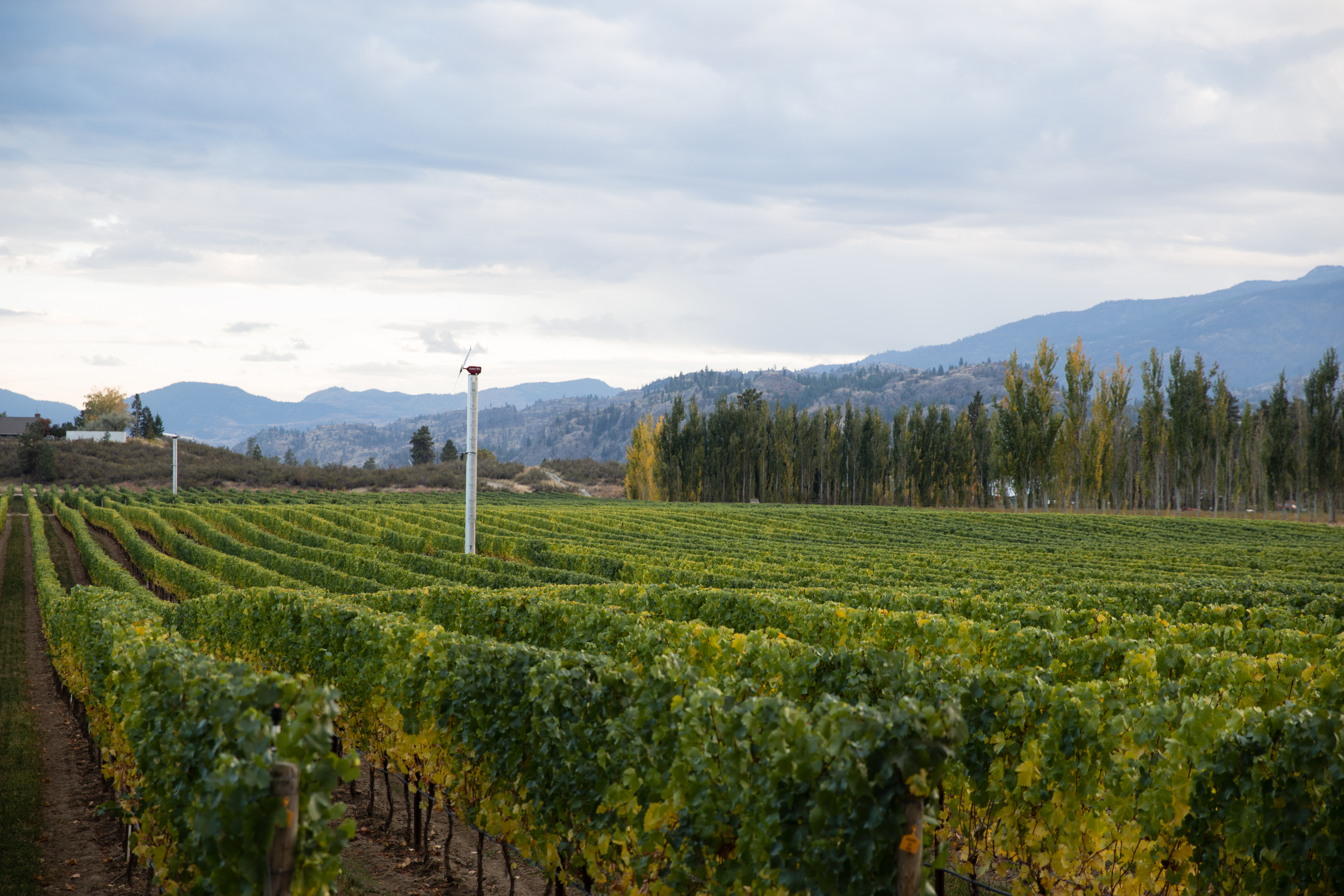
- Official name: Okanagan Valley
- Year established: 1989
- Years of wine industry: 20
- Country: Canada
- Part of: Okanagan
- Growing season: April–October
- Climate region: Ia
- Precipitation (annual average): <12 inches
- Size of planted vineyards: 2,400 hectares
- No. of vineyards: 200+
- Varietals produced: Pinot Noir, Chardonnay & others
- No. of wineries: 120

The Okanagan Valley wine region, located within the region of the same name in the British Columbia Interior, is Canada's second-largest wine producing area. Along with the nearby Similkameen Valley, the approximately 8,619 acres (3,488 hectares) of vineyards planted in the Okanagan (2018 data) account for more than 80% of all wine produced in British Columbia, and are second in economic importance for wine production to the Niagara Peninsula of Ontario. Some 182 licensed wineries existed from south to north in the valley in 2018, with many situated along the 135 km (84 mi)-long Okanagan Lake and its tributaries and downstream lakes, including Skaha Lake, Vaseux Lake, and Osoyoos Lake. The Okanagan has diverse terrain that features many different microclimates and vineyard soil types, contributing characteristics which are part of an Okanagan terroir.

Wine production in the Okanagan dates to the 1850s, with the establishment of Okanagan Mission and the planting of grapevines to supply sacramental wines. In the early 20th century, prohibition in Canada wiped out many of the Okanagan's earliest wineries and the commercial wine industry in the area was not revived until the 1930s. From this time through the mid-1970s, the Okanagan wine industry was based entirely on the production of fruit wines and those produced from hybrid grapes. The Okanagan wine industry has been developed to include dining experiences for pairing wine with farm-to-plate foods.

== History ==
The first vineyard planted in the Okanagan was at the Oblate Mission in Kelowna in 1859, planted by French Catholic priest Charles Pandosy and was solely intended for the production of sacramental wine for the celebration of the Eucharist. Several small vineyards, planted mostly with Vitis labrusca operated until prohibition in the United States in the 1920s encouraged the uprooting and replanting with other agricultural crops. For most of the 20th century after prohibition ended in 1933, what limited wine production that took place in the Okanagan was mostly fruit wines made from berries, apples, cherries or even table grapes. One winery, Calona Wines founded in 1932, still remains from that period and was the first commercial winery in British Columbia and remains the oldest continuously running winery in the province. Eventually the use of French-American hybrid grapes, such as Marechal Foch and Vidal blanc took hold, led by the Stewarts of Quails' Gate Estate Winery.

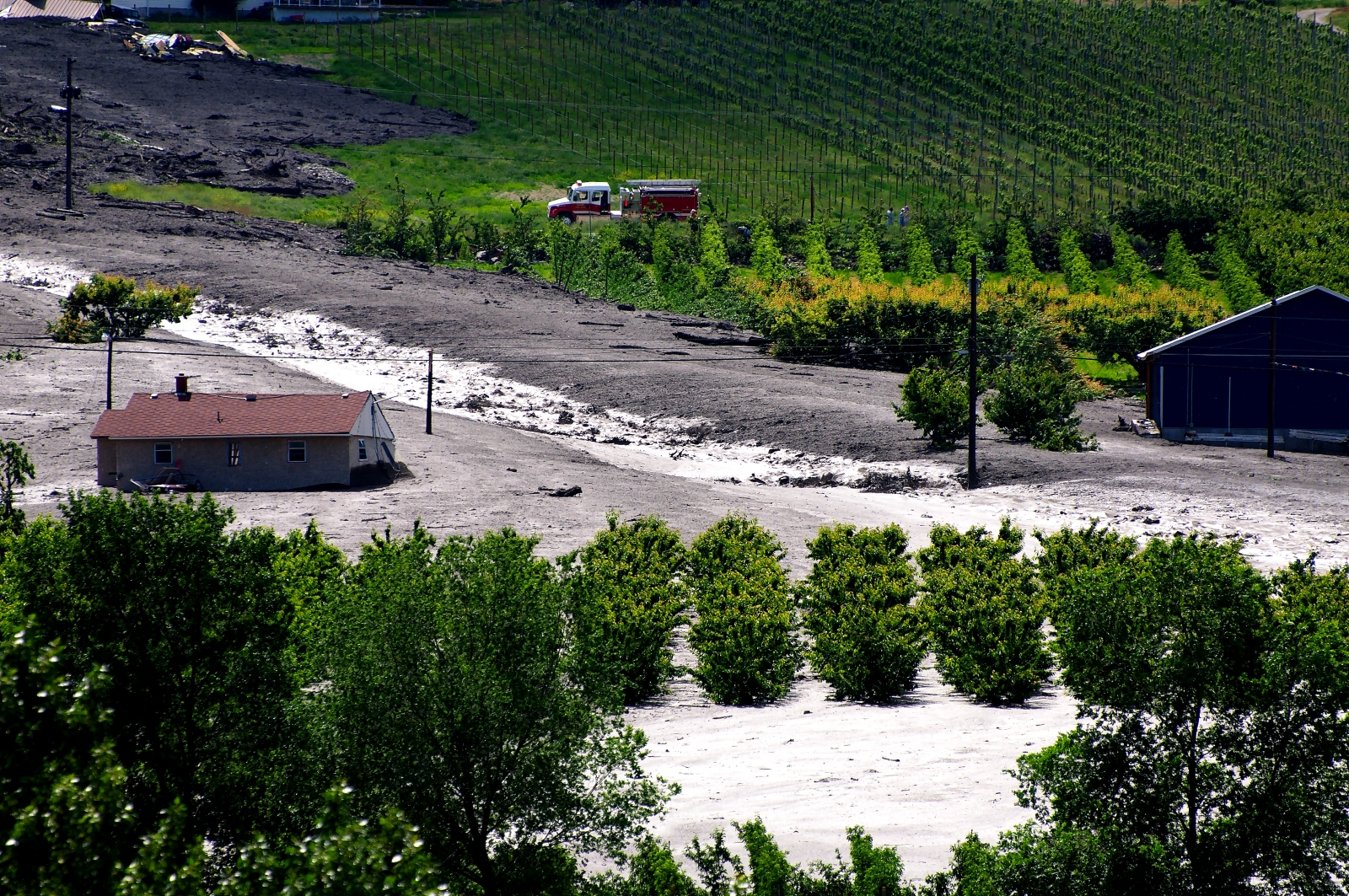
A vineyard near Oliver, BC after the June, 2010 mudslides.

In the mid-1970s, several growers began experimenting with plantings of Vitis vinifera. The Osoyoos Indian band established the first commercial vineyard dedicated to vinifera varieties with plantings of Riesling, Ehrenfelser and Scheurebe. In 1976, notable German viticulturalist and grape breeder Helmut Becker visited the Okanagan and encouraged more growers to consider planting German grape varieties and provided clones of Pinot blanc, Pinot gris and Gewürtztraminer that were developed at the Geisenheim Grape Breeding Institute and bred to withstand the cold, winter temperatures of the Okanagan. Further impetus for the planting of vinifera came in the late 1980s when Canada entered into the North American Free Trade Agreement that opened up the Canadian markets to American wines from California, Oregon and Washington. The competition from imported wines spurred the Canadian government to implement a vine pulling scheme with grants for growers who uprooted their hybrid and labrusca vines and replaced them with vinifera.

In June 2010, several vineyards in the southern Okanagan near Oliver were devastated by a dam failure that released 20,000 cubic metres (710,000 cu ft) of water down Testalinda Creek, triggering a mudslide with a 180-metre (590 ft) wide swath of debris that extended over kilometres of vineyards and shut down the major roadway through the area. More than 16 hectares (40 acres) of vineyards were damaged by over 240,000 cubic metres (310,000 cu yd) of mud and rock.

== Grape varieties and wine styles ==
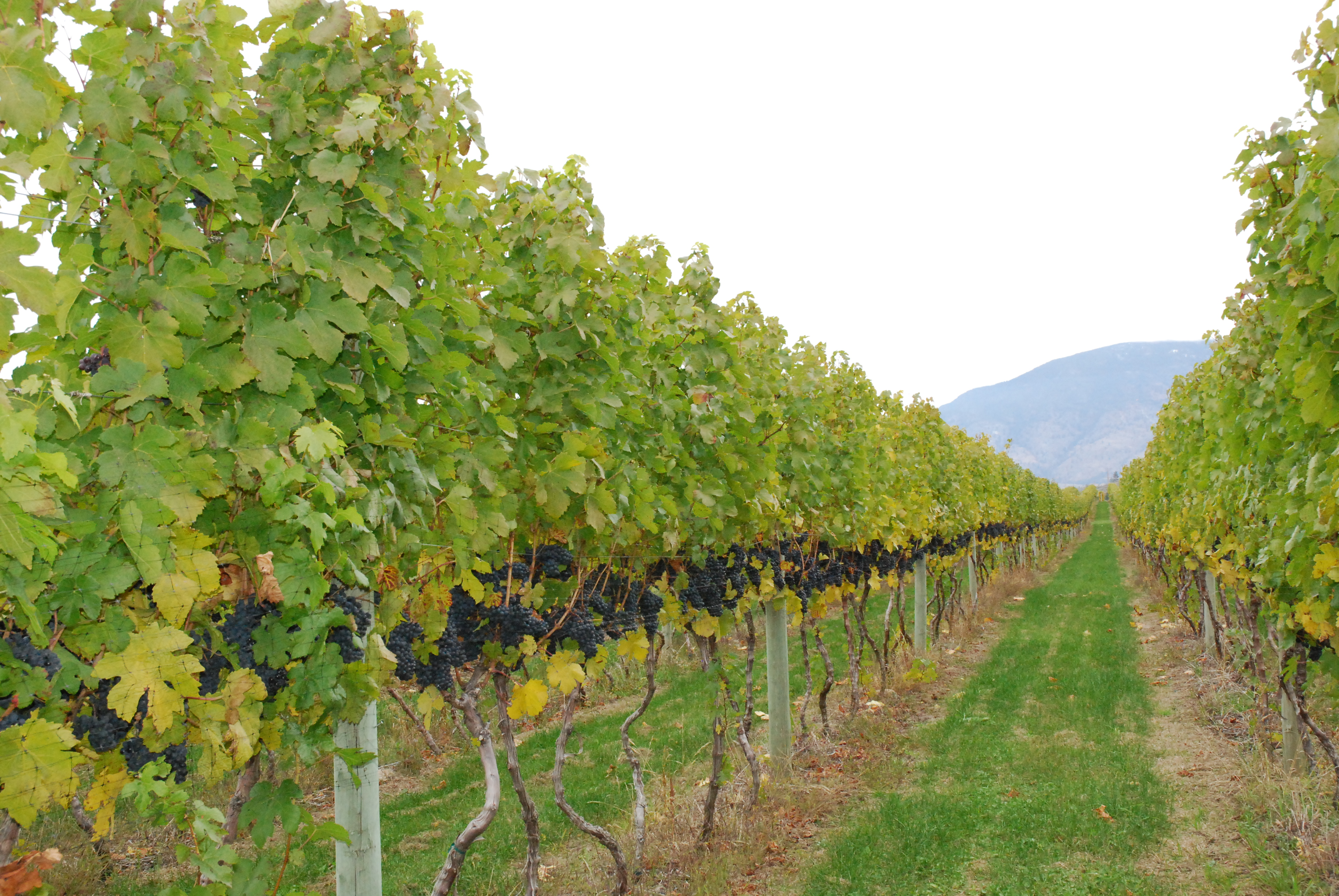
Grapevines in the Okanagan

Nearly every style of wine is produced across the whole spectrum of sweetness levels that include still, sparkling, fortified and dessert wines—most notably ice wines. There are more than 60 grape varieties grown in the Okanagan including Merlot, Cabernet Sauvignon, Pinot noir, Pinot gris, Chardonnay, Auxerrois blanc, Marechal Foch and Cabernet Franc. Additionally many German varieties are still found throughout the Okanagan including Riesling, Gewürztraminer, Bacchus, Optima, Ehrenfelser, Kerner, Siegerebe.

In the 21st century, growers have been planting more warm climate varieties typically not associated with the Canadian wine industry. Recent plantings include Sangiovese, Syrah, Tempranillo, Trebbiano, Pinotage, Malbec, Barbera and Zinfandel.

== Geography ==
The region stretches 160 kilometres (99 mi) north from the Canada–United States border with Washington state and is located 400 kilometres east of Vancouver between the 49th and 50th parallel north, putting it in the same latitude with the European wine regions of Champagne and Rheingau.

While not yet divided into sub-appellations, the British Columbia Wine Institute lists seven Okanagan viticultural regions: Lake Country/North Okanagan, Kelowna-Central Okanagan, West Kelowna-Mount Boucherie, Summerland-Peachland, Penticton-Naramata, Okanagan Falls, Oliver/Golden Mile and Black Sage/Osoyoos.

== Climate ==
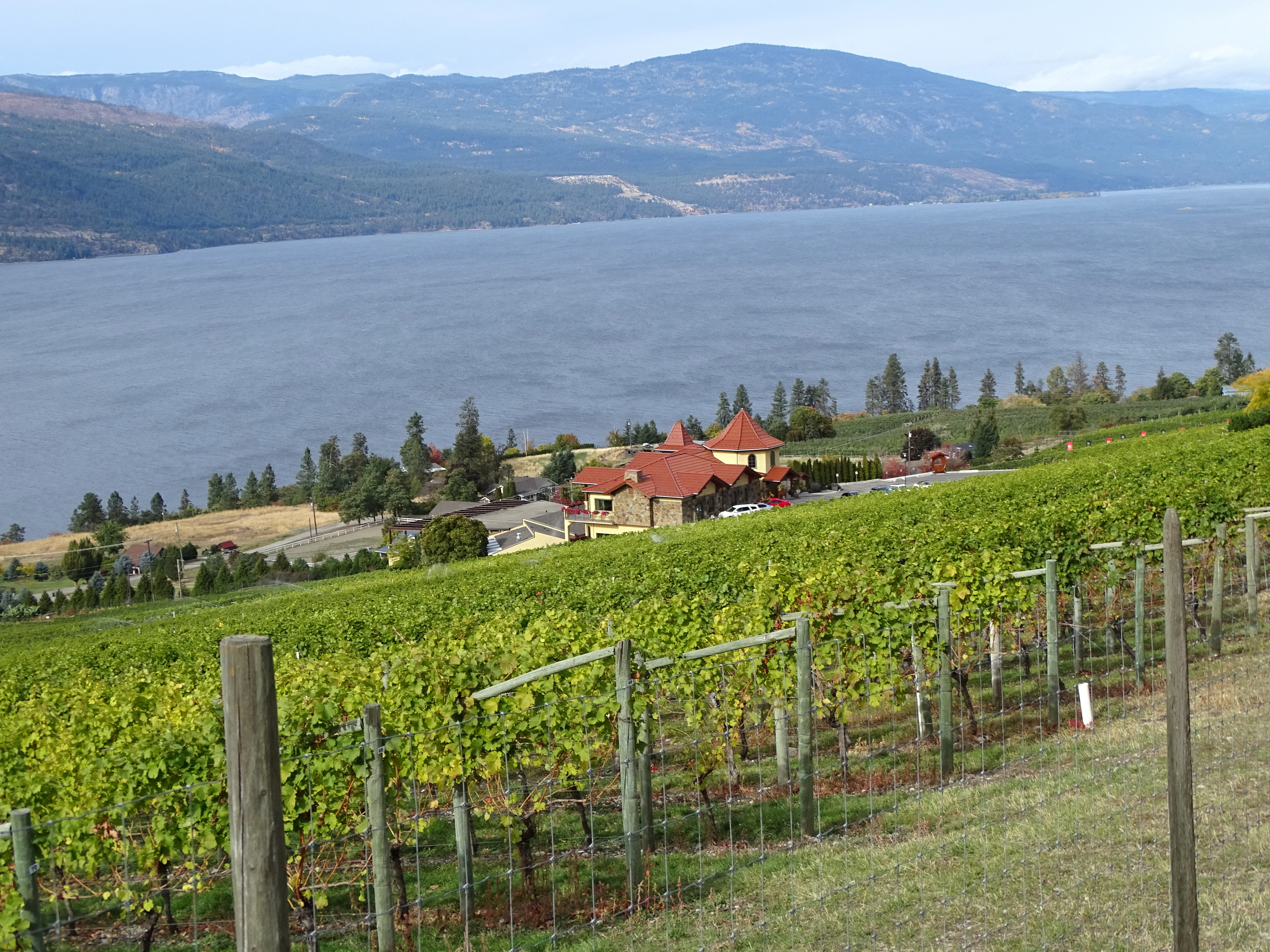
Okanagan Lake helps moderate the climate in the Okanagan region which receives very little rainfall throughout the year (picture from Lake Country, BC).

The Okanagan has a continental climate that is moderated by the deep Okanagan Lake and its connected bodies of water in the valley, Skaha Lake, Vaseux Lake and Osoyoos Lake as parts of the Okanagan Basin. The Cascade and Coast Mountains create a rain shadow effect shared by adjoining areas of Eastern Washington. This leaves the Okanagan with low annual precipitation totals that range from below 250 millimetres (9.8 in)in the southern tip of the region around Osoyoos to 400 millimetres (16 in) in the northern part of the region between Kelowna and Vernon. This means most vineyards require irrigation from nearby water sources.

Like many wine regions with continental climates, the Okanagan may experience winters that are moderately cold, but generally short-lived. During extreme cold snaps, temperatures can fall as low as −25 °C (−13 °F). One such cold snap occurred in December 2022, causing significant damage and reduced production. Before that, the last winter to cause severe cold damage to vines was 1978.

The average daytime temperatures during the growing season months of July and August are hot, often above 30 °C (86 °F) in the southern valley to higher 20s°C in the northern valley. Temperatures may surpass 40 °C (104 °F), often exceeding 35 °C (95 °F) for several days in a row. The region's northerly latitude allows the vines to experience longer hours of daylight than the more southerly vineyards of California, with the Okanagan summer providing some 14 hours daily of direct sun.
