= Appellations of origin for wine =

Legally defined and protected geographical indication

An appellation is a legally defined and protected geographical indication used to identify where the ingredients of a food or beverage originated, most often used for the origin of wine grapes. Restrictions other than geographical boundaries, such as what grapes may be grown, maximum grape yields, alcohol level, and other quality factors may also apply before an appellation name may legally appear on a wine bottle label. The rules that govern appellations are dependent on the country in which the wine was produced.

== History ==
The tradition of associating a wine with its place of origin is thousands of years old. The oldest references are to be found in the Bible, where wine of Samaria, wine of Carmel, wine of Jezreel, or wine of Helbon are mentioned. This tradition of appellation continued throughout the Antiquity and the Middle Ages, though without any officially sanctioned rules. Historically, the world's first exclusive (protected) vineyard zone was introduced in Chianti, Italy, in 1716 and the first wine classification system was established in Tokaj-Hegyalja, Hungary, in 1730.

== Europe ==
=== Austria ===
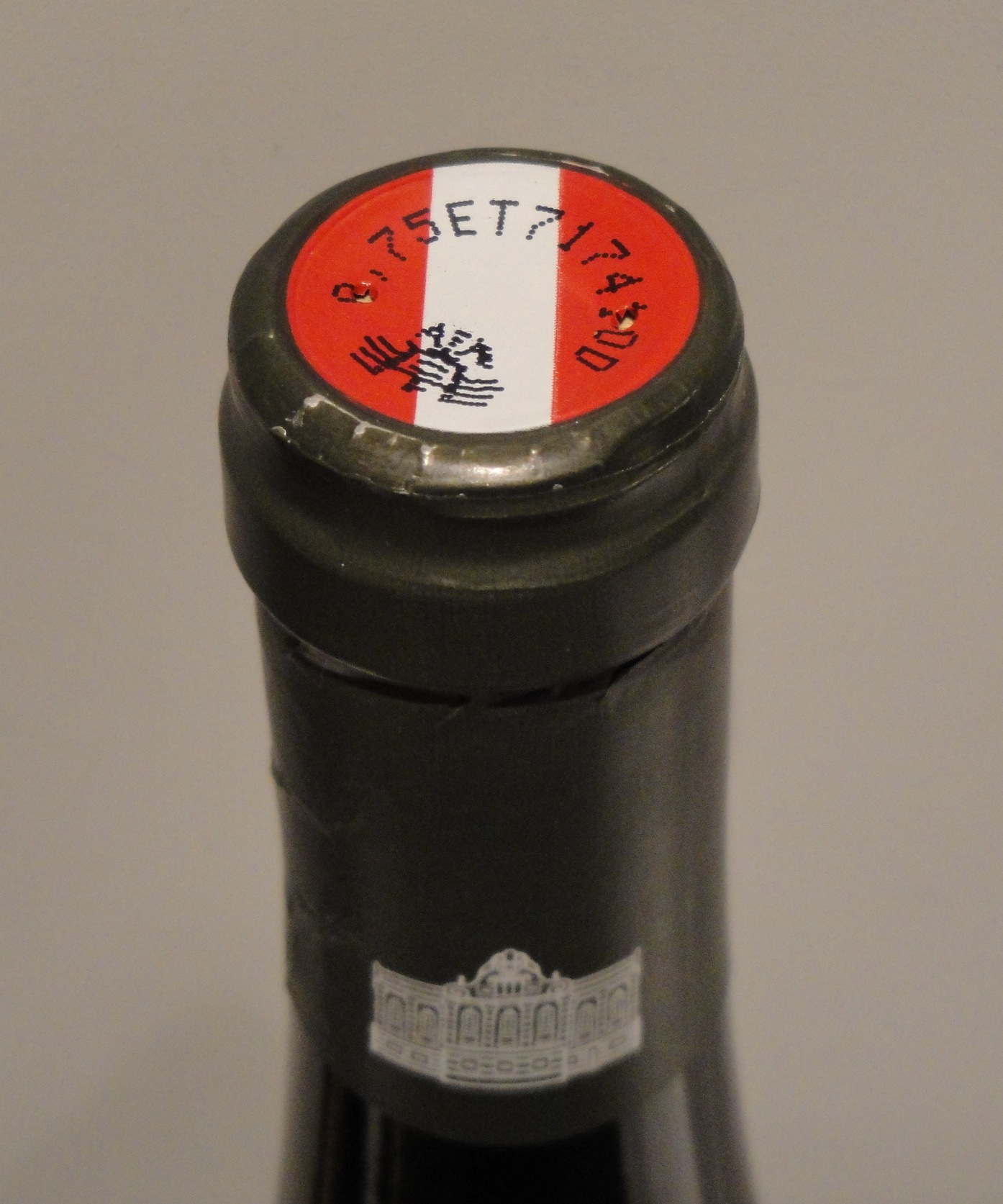
Austrian quality wine with red-white-red "banderole" showing the producer number

The Districtus Austriae Controllatus (DAC) scheme was gradually introduced in Austria from 2002 to 2023. It is modelled after the French AOC system. All Austrian quality wines have a round, red and white striped "Banderole" on the capsule, which ensures that it has been inspected and approved by the government tasting authority and fulfills the requirements for Qualitätswein (quality wine), such as maximum yields per hectare, minimum must weight and alcohol levels and guaranteed origin of the grapes.

=== France ===
In 1935, the Institut National des Appellations d'Origine (INAO), a branch of the French Ministry of Agriculture, was created to manage wine processing in France. In the Rhone wine region, Baron Pierre Le Roy Boiseaumarié, a lawyer and winegrower from Châteauneuf-du-Pape, obtained legal recognition of the Côtes du Rhône appellation of origin in 1937. The AOC seal, or appellation d'origine contrôlée, was created and mandated by French laws in the 1950s, 1960s, and 1970s.

Before 1935, despite the fact that the INAO was yet to be created, champagne enjoyed an appellation control by virtue of legal protection as part of the 1891 Treaty of Madrid. The treaty stated that only sparkling wine produced in Champagne and adhering to the standards defined for that name as an appellation d'origine contrôlée could be called champagne. This right was reaffirmed in the 1919 Treaty of Versailles after World War I.

=== Germany ===
Germany is unusual among wine-producing countries in that its most prestigious classifications, the various grades of Prädikatswein, are based on the ripeness of the grapes, though their geographical origins are also legally defined. Thus Germany's geographical classification, Qualitätswein bestimmter Anbaugebiete (QbA), is akin to France's former vin délimité de qualité supérieure, a less restrictive designation that was not popular in use and was abolished in 2011, being subsumed into the current appellation d'origine contrôlée system.

=== Georgia ===
As of October 2026, Georgia has 44 registered wine appellations of origin. Georgia also has looser registered geographical indications that can be used and one additional appellation of origin identified as "published" but not yet "registered".

=== Hungary ===
Historically, the world's first vineyard classification system was introduced in Tokaj-Hegyalja, Hungary, in 1730. Vineyards were classified into three categories depending on the soil, sun exposure, and potential to develop the Botrytis cinerea fungus (which causes both the detrimental bunch rot and beneficial noble rot). The subdivisions were: first-class, second-class and third-class wines. A decree by the Habsburg crown in 1757 established a closed production district in Tokaj. The classification system was completed by the national censuses of 1765 and 1772.

=== Italy ===
Italy's first origin classification system was introduced in Tuscany in 1716 for delimiting Chianti production. After the unification of Italy in 1871, several attempts were made to introduce some kind of protection for wine appellations, but these did not succeed until the "Denominazione di origine controllata" law was approved in 1963, starting with 1967 vintage.

=== Portugal ===
The world's third-oldest appellation control, after Chianti and Tokaj, was introduced in Portugal in 1756, pertaining to port wine, which was produced in the region of the Douro valley.

=== Spain ===
Some Spanish wines were already famous or even regulated (Rioja: 1925; Sherry: 1933) when the market started being regulated. Formal legislation on denominación de origen was established starting in 1980, following the French scheme with more tiers of classification and prompted by the impending accession to the European Union.

== North America ==
=== Canada ===
Canadian wine appellations are regulated by the Vintners Quality Alliance system. The system covers the provinces of British Columbia and Ontario.

British Columbia is divided into four "Designated Viticultural Areas" ("DVAs"): Okanagan Valley, Vancouver Island, Fraser Valley, and the Similkameen Valley. Ontario includes three DVAs: Niagara Peninsula, Lake Erie North Shore, and Prince Edward County.

On June 11, 2012, Nova Scotia launched its first appellation, Tidal Bay.

=== United States ===
American Viticultural Area ("AVA") is the type of appellation used for the United States. The only requirements to use an AVA name on the wine label are that 85% of the wine must have come from grapes grown within the geographical AVA boundaries and the wine must be fully finished within the US state where the AVA is located. The first AVA was in Augusta, Missouri, established in June 1980. The approval of the Augusta AVA was based largely on its long historical relationship with wine in the United States. The Augusta wine-growing area is a 15-square-mile (39 km^{2}) plot of land along the Missouri River, which provides a moderate temperature and appropriate climate for growing grapes.

States or counties can also be used in lieu of an AVA to designate the origin of a wine, provided that 75% of the grapes used in the wine are grown in the state or county listed on the label.

== List of appellation schemes ==
- European Union: Protected designation of origin
  - Austria: Districtus Austriae Controllatus
  - Cyprus: Ελεγχόμενη Ονομασία Προέλευσης
  - France: Appellation d'origine contrôlée
  - Germany: German wine classification
  - Greece: ονομασία προελεύσεως ελεγχομένη
  - Italy: Denominazione di Origine Controllata
  - Luxembourg: Appellation contrôlée
  - Portugal: Denominação de Origem Controlada
  - Romania: Denumire de Origine Controlată
  - Spain: Denominación de origen protegida
- Switzerland: Appellation d'origine contrôlée
- Australia: Australian Geographical Indications
- Argentina: Denominación de origen - see also:Argentine wine
- Canada: Vintners Quality Alliance
- Brazil: Denominação de Origem
- Chile: see Chilean wine
- South Africa: Wine of Origin
- United Kingdom: Protected Denomination of Origin
- United States: American Viticultural Area

== See also ==
- Protected designation of origin – A type of geographical indication regulated in the European Union
- Terroir – The environmental factors that affect the character of a crop
- Eponym – Person or thing after which something is named
