= Diamond Estates Wines & Spirits Ltd. =

Canadian winemaking company

Coordinates: 43.1061353°N 79.1291776°W

- Company type: Publicly traded on the TSX
- Industry: Manufacturing wine and liquor
- Founded: 2000
- Headquarters: Niagara on the Lake, Ontario, Canada
- Products: Wine, liquor
- Website: lakeviewineco.com

Diamond Estates Wines & Spirits Ltd. is a winemaking company headquartered in Niagara on the Lake, Ontario, Canada. They are best known for their wines including the brands 20 Bees, EastDell Estates, Lakeview Cellars, Lakeview Wine Co., Creekside Wines, Queenston Mile, FRESH, Mindful, and Backyard Vineyards, among others.

Diamond Estates Wines & Spirits Ltd. was founded in 2000, and became a publicly traded company in 2013.
