= Colio Estate Wines =

Vineyard and winery in Ontario, Canada

Coordinates: 42.0407°N 82.9161°W

Colio Estate Wines is a 240-acre (0.97 km^{2}) vineyard and winery in Harrow, Ontario, Canada, that opened in 1980.

Its brand includes CEV Signature Series-Limited Edition Wines, Colio Estate Vineyards Ultra Premium, Colio Estate VQA Varietals and Premium, Colio Varietals and Blends and Girls' Night Out. They produce ice wines, sparkling wines and St. Tropez Non-Alcoholic Cocktail. They have won over 450 awards in global competitions.

== Winemakers ==
Carlo Negri immigrated from Italy in 1980 to be Colio Estate Wines' first wine maker. His 30 year long career is credited with the flourishing wine/tourism of the Lake Erie North-Shore area. Carlo won the "Tony Aspler Cuvée Award of Excellence" in 2005, an honor awarded to those who have "done most to further the aims and aspirations of the Ontario Wine Industry". Carlo and the winery won two Gold Medals in 2002, for the CEV Merlot Reserve in the Red Wine Category, and for CEV Carlo Negri Signature Meritage in the Limited Edition Red Wine category. They also won "Best in Category" honors the same year. After his death in July 2014, Colio Estate Wines set up a $10,000 scholarship. Partnering with both St. Clair College and Brock University, the scholarship offers $5,000 to students studying culinary arts and hospitality and another $5,000 to students studying winemaking.

In 2003, the winery hired winemaker Tim Reilly and moved their vineyard manager, Kevin Donohue, to the winemaking team. Reilly became head of winemaking from 2007–2012. The winery has since acquired 21 acres (85,000 m^{2}) in the Niagara-on-the-Lake region.

== Girls' Night Out ==
The Girls' Night Out product line includes nine wine beverages, specializing in chardonnay, sparkling wines, rosés and sangria. Their label design, three cocktail dresses, won a Silver Medal for label design at the Ontario Wine Awards in 2009. Their products have been featured in magazines such as Food and Wine, Elle and Hello! Canada.

=== Awards ===
- Chardonnay – Silver Medal at the All-Canadian Wine Championships (2009)
- Rosé – Silver Medal at the Wine and Food Show (2009)

== Thornbury Beverage Co. ==
Thornbury Beverage Company is a cidery and brewery located in the Georgian Bay region. Established in 2006, the cidery operates on 7,500 acres of apple orchards. They produce Ontario craft ciders and beers. The company was bought by Colio Estate Winery in early 2016.

=== Awards ===
Thornbury Village Cidery has won 7 awards:

- 2016 Gold Medal best 'Common Cider', OFVC Cider competition, Thornbury Cider
- 2016 Silver Medal "Specialty Cider", OFVC Cider Competition, Thornbury Apple Cranberry Cider
- 2015 Gold Medal, Canadian Brewing Awards, Thornbury Cranberry Cider and Pickup Truck Pilsner
- 2015 Bronze Medal, Canadian Brewing Awards, Thornbury Premium Apple Cider
- 2013 Gold Medal, Great Lakes International Cider and Perry Competition
- 2012 Silver Medal, World Beer Championships Award
- 2011 World Beer Championships Award
