= Denumire de origine controlată =

Romanian-language appellation system for food

Denumire de origine controlată (DOC) is a Romanian-language appellation regime in Europe to designate food with a particular origin. It is part of the Geographical indications and traditional specialties in the European Union system, and is used for various agricultural products, including wine and other products. One example of a product containing this designation is Magiun of Topoloveni jam, which has a Protected Geographical Status from the European Union.
