= Vintners Quality Alliance =

Regulatory system for Canadian wines

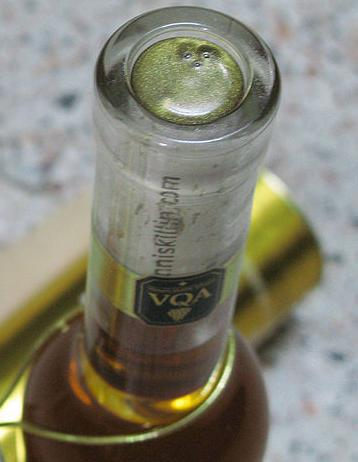
The VQA label on a bottle of Canadian icewine.

Vintners Quality Alliance, or VQA, is a regulatory and appellation system which guarantees the high quality and authenticity of origin for Canadian wines made under that system in British Columbia and Ontario. It is similar to regulatory systems in France (AOC), Spain (DO), Italy (DOC), and Germany (QmP). The VQA system allows for sub-appellations, by which the grapes for wines are sourced from extremely specific geographical locations with different soil and climate. This is in accordance with the concept of terroir.

In addition, there are other classifications of wine in Canada. British Columbia has a category known as "Wines of Distinction", Nova Scotia has "Wines of Nova Scotia" and Quebec has "Vins du Québec". All must be 100 percent made from grapes grown in British Columbia, Nova Scotia or Quebec, respectively. Cellared in Canada is a completely separate category.

== Requirements ==
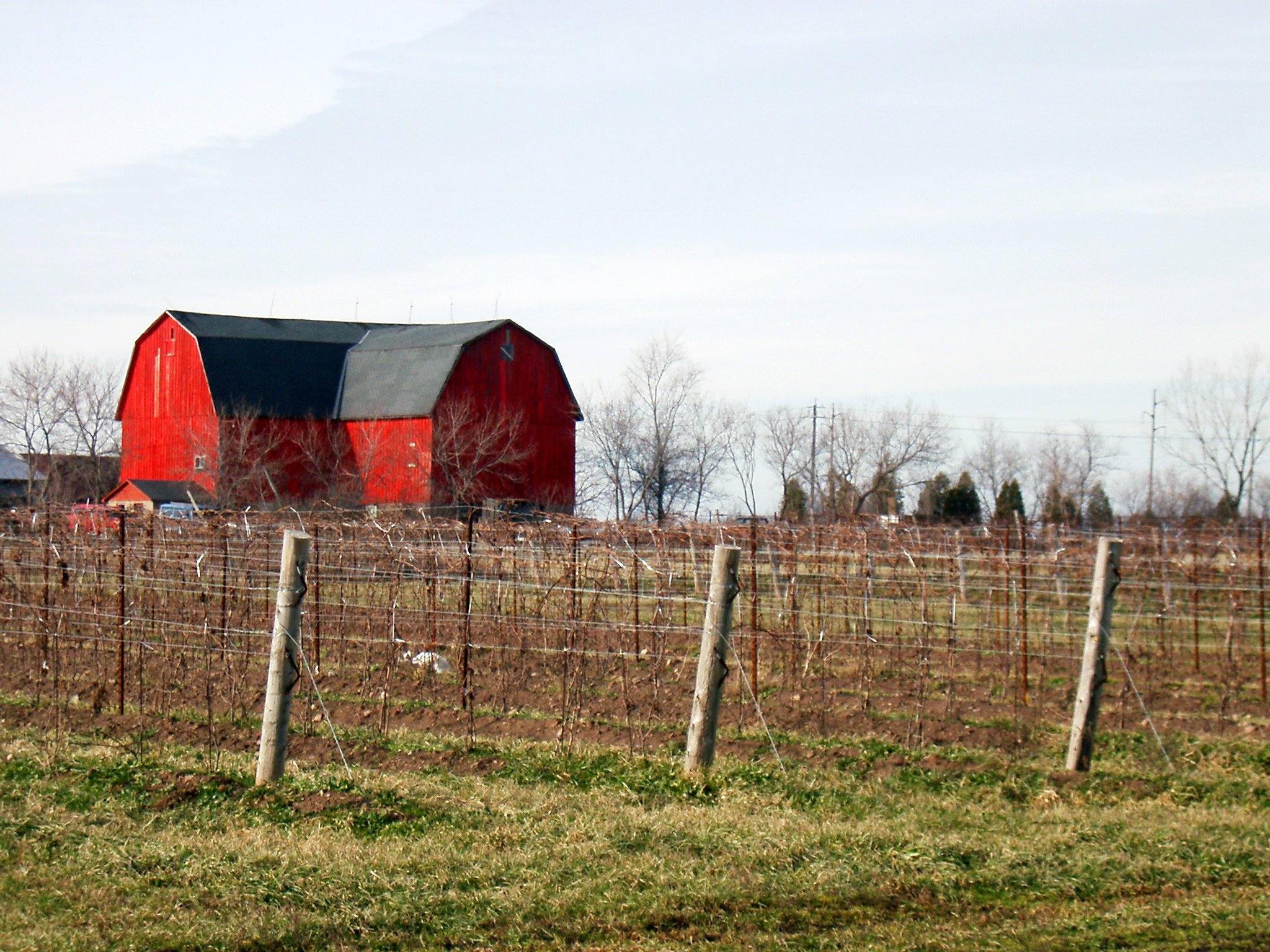
An Ontario vineyard in the Niagara Peninsula regional appellation.

In addition to the requirements regarding sources of grapes, VQA wines may be made from Vitis vinifera grape variety and approved hybrid varieties. In British Columbia, VQA wines are made primarily with vinifera grapes, while Ontario uses a range of vinifera varieties and notably permits the use of Vidal, particularly in the production of some of Canada's icewines.

VQA wines may be made with grapes from relatively small agricultural yields per vine (which increases quality), they meet specific sugar or brix levels at harvest, and the use of additives is regulated. There are also standards regulating the use of certain types of packaging and closures. To receive the VQA designation, wine must undergo testing by the regulating bodies. The VQA logo does not have a standard location on the bottle, and for some VQA wines the producer has chosen not to display the logo at all. If a consumer wishes to purchase wine from 100% Canadian grapes, extra care must be taken to ensure that the wine is what they believe it to be, and not an "International Canadian blend" (formerly known as "Cellared in Canada").

== Appellations ==
=== Ontario appellations and sub-appellations ===
Total production for Ontario appellation wines is approximately 20,000 tonnes

- Appellation - Niagara Peninsula (includes all appellations below, Canada's largest)
  - Regional appellation - Niagara Escarpment (includes the 3 sub-appellations below)
    - Sub-appellation - Short Hills Bench
    - Sub-appellation - Twenty Mile Bench
    - Sub-appellation - Beamsville Bench
  - Regional appellation - Niagara-on-the-Lake (includes the 4 sub-appellations immediately below)
    - Sub-appellation - Niagara River
    - Sub-appellation - Niagara Lakeshore
    - Sub-appellation - Four Mile Creek
    - Sub-appellation - St. David's Bench
  - Sub-appellation - Vinemount Ridge
  - Sub-appellation - Creek Shores
  - Sub-appellation - Lincoln Lakeshore
- Appellation - Lake Erie North Shore
  - Sub-appellation - South Islands
- Appellation - Prince Edward County

In addition, the Ontario Wine Appellation Authority recognizes the following emerging regions, which are not yet recognized as official appellations:

- Norfolk and Haldimand Counties
- Central Ontario and Georgian Bay
- Huron Shores
- Eastern Ontario

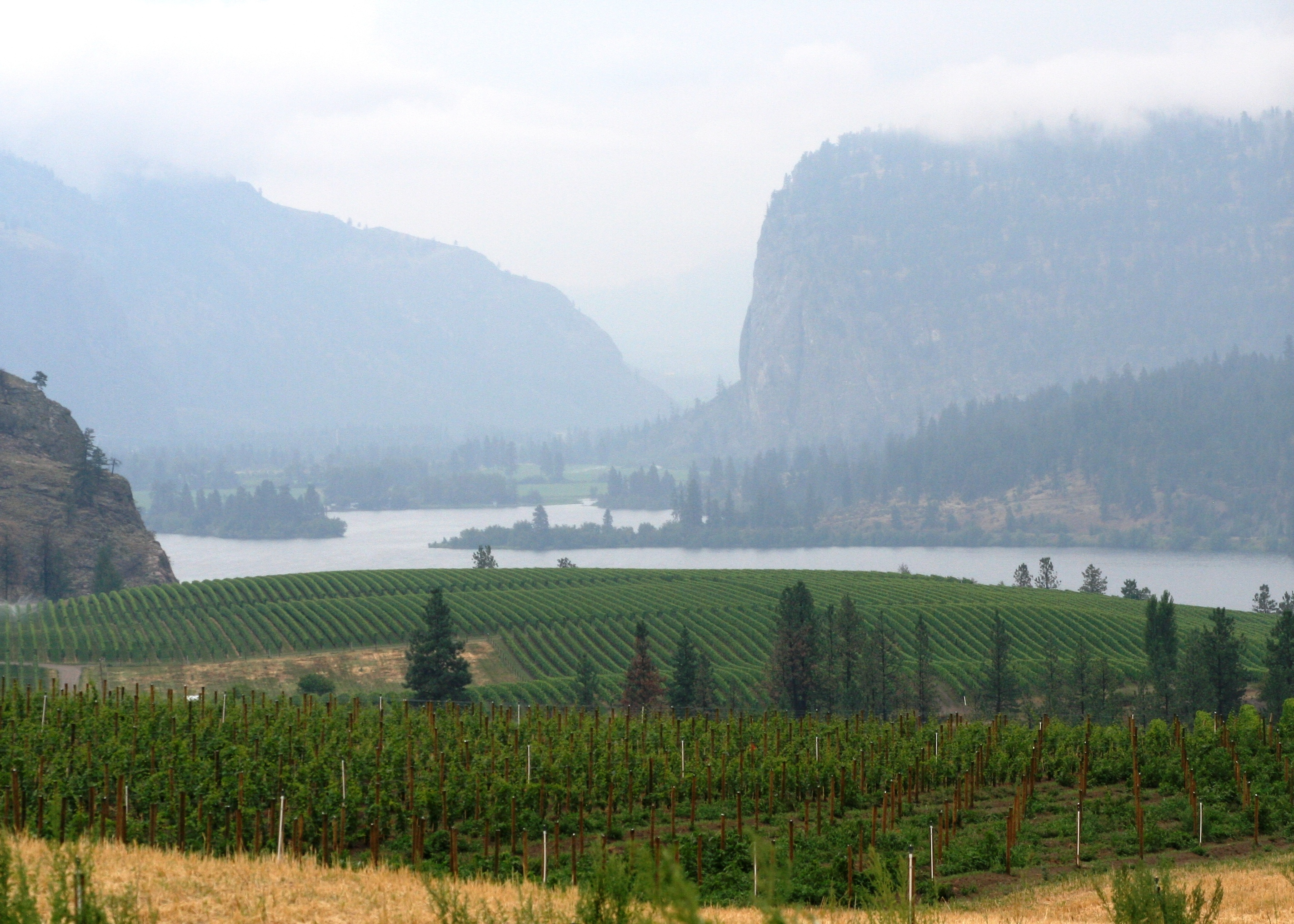
Vineyard in the Okanagan regional appellation of British Columbia.

=== British Columbia geographical indications (appellations) ===
(total production for 2012 27,000+ tons)

- GI - Fraser Valley
- GI - Gulf Islands
- GI - Kootenays
- GI - Lillooet
- GI - Okanagan Valley
  - Sub-GI - East Kelowna Slopes
  - Sub-GI - Golden Mile Bench
  - Sub-GI - Golden Mile Slopes
  - Sub-GI - Lake Country
  - Sub-GI - Okanagan Falls
  - Sub-GI - Naramata Bench
  - Sub-GI - Skaha Bench
  - Sub-GI - South Kelowna Slopes
  - Sub-GI - Summerland Bench
  - Sub-GI - Summerland Lakefront
  - Sub-GI - Summerland Valleys
- GI - Shuswap
- GI - Similkameen Valley
- GI - Thompson Valley
- GI - Vancouver Island
  - Sub-GI - Cowichan Valley

== Organizations ==
=== Regulatory ===
- British Columbia Wine Institute (the regulatory role is being transferred to the new British Columbia Wine Authority, which will be a government body).
- Vintners Quality Alliance Ontario, which is a regulatory agency of the Province of Ontario that administers the Ontario VQA Act.

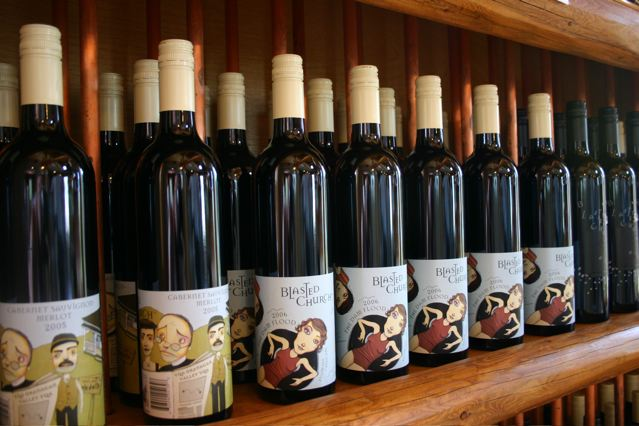
Canadian wine from British Columbia.

=== Marketing & Advocacy ===
- British Columbia Wine Institute
- Wine Council of Ontario
- Winery Association of Nova Scotia
- Vignerons independants du Quebec

=== Other organizations ===
- B.C. Grape Growers Association (represent independent growers).
- Association of B.C. Winegrowers (represents smaller and fruit wineries).
- Grape Growers of Ontario (represent growers and negotiate the prices of grapes).
- Ontario Wine Producers Association
