= Niagara Peninsula =

Region in Ontario, Canada

Coordinates: 43.00°N 79.50°W

- Region
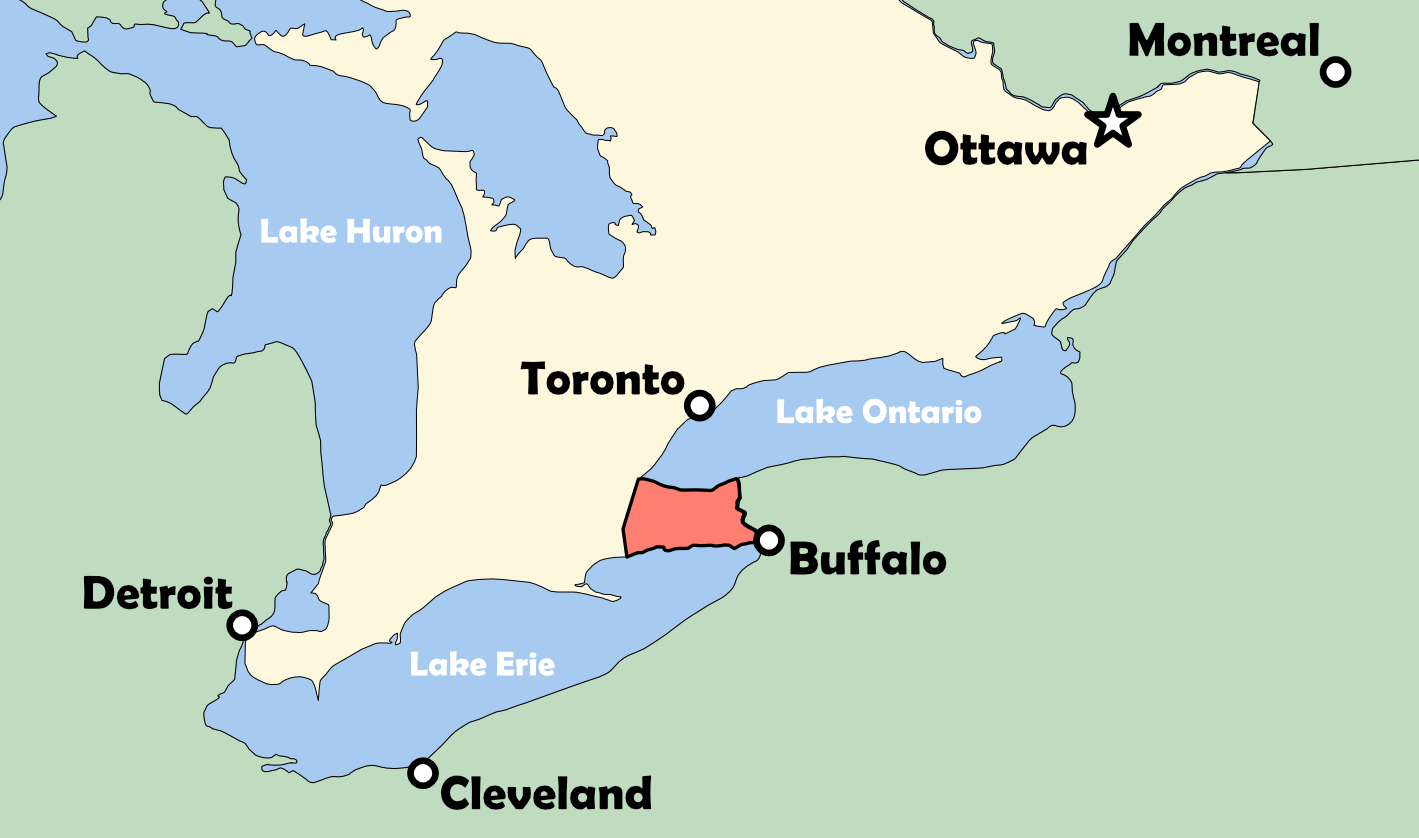
- Map of Southern Ontario with the Niagara Peninsula in red
- Country: Canada
- Province: Ontario

The Niagara Peninsula is a geographic—cultural region lying between the southwestern shore of Lake Ontario and the northeastern shore of Lake Erie, in Ontario, Canada. Technically an isthmus rather than a peninsula, it stretches from the Niagara River in the east to Hamilton, Ontario, in the west. The peninsula is located in the Golden Horseshoe region of Southern Ontario, and has a population of roughly 500,000 residents. The region directly across the Niagara River and Lake Erie in New York State is known as the Niagara Frontier.

== Government ==
The greater part of the peninsula is incorporated as the Regional Municipality of Niagara. Cities in the region include St. Catharines, Niagara Falls, Thorold, Port Colborne and Welland. Towns include Niagara-on-the-Lake, Lincoln, Pelham, Grimsby and Fort Erie, as well as the townships of Wainfleet and West Lincoln. The remainder of the peninsula encompasses parts of the City of Hamilton and Haldimand County.

== History ==
The area was originally inhabited by a First Nations people called the "Neutrals", so named for their practice of trading goods such as flint arrowhead blanks with both of the feuding regional powers, the Wendat, Anishinaabeg, and Haudenosaunee. The Neutrals were wiped out by the Haudenosaunee c. 1650 as the latter sought to expand their fur-trapping territory as part of the Beaver Wars. From this point until the arrival of United Empire Loyalists in the 1780s following the American War of Independence, the region was only sporadically inhabited, as the Haudenosaunee did not establish permanent settlements in the area.

The Niagara Peninsula then became one of the first areas settled in Upper Canada by British Loyalists in the late 18th century. The capital of the new colony was established with the founding of Niagara-on-the-Lake, then called Newark. Many English and Irish immigrants settled in the peninsula, but by the 1800s, Italian and German immigrants heavily populated the peninsula and were the chief sources of immigrants followed by French, Polish, and other Central Europeans.

Following the agricultural period of European settlement, the Niagara area became an important industrial centre, with water-powered mills joined later by hydro-electric power generation in Niagara Falls and electricity-intensive industry in both Niagara Falls and St. Catharines. While agriculture – especially fruit farming along the shore of Lake Ontario – remains important to this day, it was joined in the 19th century by industrial developments. A succession of canals were built to connect the markets and mineral resources of the upper Great Lakes with the St. Lawrence Seaway (See also Welland Canal). General Motors built a considerable presence in St. Catharines with auto plants and a foundry, and a number of auto-parts manufacturers followed. Dry docks were also built at Port Weller on Lake Ontario.

Niagara City Cruises at Niagara Falls.

== 21st century ==
Heavy industry has been diminishing for the past decade or more primarily due to the slow-down of the North American automotive manufacturers. Thousands of jobs have been lost at long-time area employers such as General Motors, Thompson Products, Deere & Company, Dana Canada Corp, Port Weller Drydocks, Domtar Papers, and Gallagher Thorold Paper. Because of this, local municipalities have been forced to look at new and diversified opportunities to prevent an exodus of well trained staff.

== Visiting ==
Hospitality and tourism has attracted numerous visitors to the area for more than 150 years primarily thanks to Niagara Falls. New development beginning during the mid-1990s has spun off an upscale hospitality boom throughout the whole Niagara Peninsula.

Today, more than 14 million guests visit the peninsula annually to see the beauty of the Falls and the Niagara Parks. Ecotourism has become more popular with more people finding and exploring out of the way places such as the Niagara Escarpment, named a world Biosphere Reserve by UNESCO in 1990.

=== Niagara Peninsula wineries ===
Another area of major tourism growth in the past thirty years has been the expansion of the grape and wine industry. The Niagara Peninsula is one of four recognized viticultural areas by the VQA in the Ontario wine industry. The many European-style wineries and vineyards have played a major role in attracting visitors seeking a unique cultural experience. Most local wineries offer tours, with some featuring unique pairings of Canadian cuisine and their VQA vintages. Wineries may retain world-class chefs to use fresh, seasonal ingredients grown or sourced from local farms. Often wineries feature live music and theatrical performances in the vineyard during the summer months. Some visitors may come during the coldest months of the year (usually December to February) to watch grape varieties being harvested and pressed outdoors in the vineyard as part of the process of creating sweet ("liquid gold"), high-valued ice wines. A few Niagara Peninsula wineries have won the most prestigious international awards for their ice wine products, which may be only available from the vintner.

There is an official Wine Routes Guide for those that wish to self-drive while transportation companies offering wine tours operate out of major hotel and bed and breakfast establishments in Niagara Falls, Niagara-on-the-Lake and Toronto. (Driving from downtown Toronto to the Niagara wine region is about two hours.)

=== Niagara-on-the-Lake ===
Another major attraction for the well travelled looking for cultural activities is the famous Shaw Festival Theater (named for playwright George Bernard Shaw) located in the town of Niagara-on-the-Lake. A resident repertory company of actors uses three theatres during a six-month season. Niagara-on-the-Lake is also the location of Fort George, a British-built and -occupied fort during the War of 1812. It was rebuilt for the public during the 1960s and is open during the summer months. Other key historical locations nearby include: Brock's Monument, the Laura Secord Monument and the battlefield sites of Battle of Queenston Heights, Battle of Lundy's Lane and Battle of Chippawa.

== Living ==
The region's moderate year-round climate, in addition to its close proximity to the United States for easy road and air access to the southern U.S., makes it a popular retirement destination. In fact, the Niagara Peninsula has both the highest density and growth rate of seniors for any region within Ontario. The highest percentage of seniors to the total population is located within the city of Port Colborne.

During the early 1990s a major telecommunications highway between metropolitan Toronto and the U.S. was upgraded to become one of North America's fastest fiber backbones. It passes through the heart of the Niagara Peninsula and enters the U.S. at Buffalo, New York. This gave Niagara the advantage of having direct access to the backbone and attracting many new professional call centers.

Compared with the cities of Toronto, Hamilton and most Ontario municipalities with populations similar in size to the whole of the Niagara Peninsula, the average cost of living is very reasonable. The cost of housing, both owned and rented, is lower. The three major cities, St. Catharines, Niagara Falls and Welland are mostly urban with most needed services available locally. The remainder of the peninsula, especially to the far west and south, is either partially urban or almost entirely rural.

Centres of higher education are Brock University and Niagara College, both offering undergraduate and post-graduate studies in many disciplines.

== Transportation ==
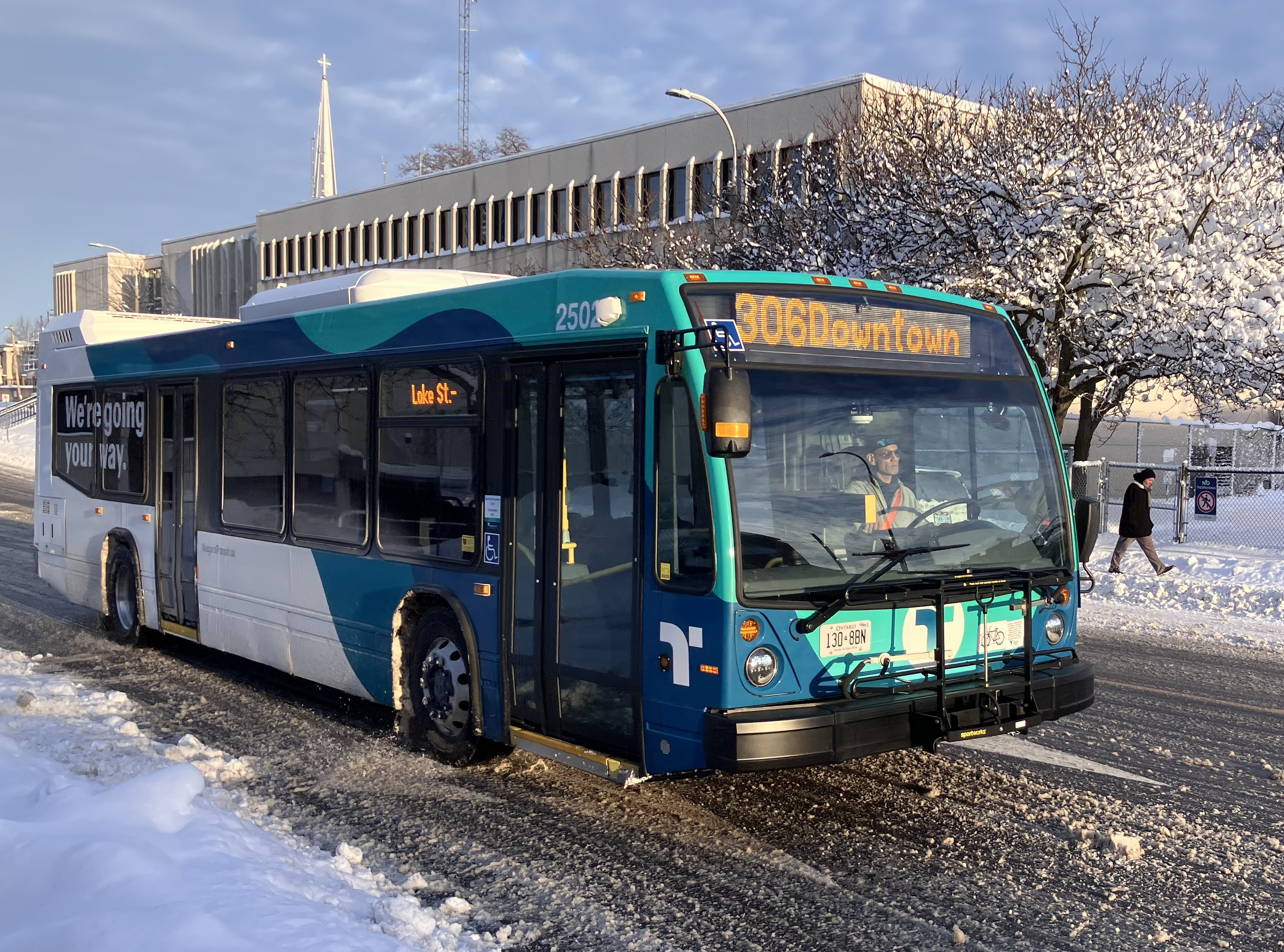
Niagara Transit Bus in St. Catharines

The major roadway bisecting the peninsula is the Queen Elizabeth Way (QEW). This freeway connects Toronto and Buffalo, New York, in the United States. It is one of the major thoroughfares for the North American trucking industry and is responsible for supporting the carriage of nearly one third of all goods imported and exported. The second major roadway is Highway 406 which begins at the QEW in west St. Catharines and ends approximately 30 km south in the city of Welland. Another shorter freeway is Highway 405, named the General Isaac Brock Parkway in 2006. It begins at the QEW in Niagara-on-the-Lake, just east of St. Catharines, and ends about 9 km away at Queenston, Ontario, where it connects to an international bridge that crosses into the United States at Lewiston, New York. This is also a major travel zone for the Canada/US trucking industry.

All cities and some towns in the peninsula have taxi services while St. Catharines, Thorold, Niagara Falls, and Welland all have Niagara Transit. There is also one major airbus company that services Toronto, Hamilton and Buffalo airports exclusively. Most cities and some towns also have very limited inter-city bus services operated mostly by Greyhound and Coach Canada. A specialized inter-city regional bus service, owned and operated by the Regional government, began operation in late 2006 but is restricted to those requiring transport to medical appointments throughout the region and have no other means of transportation. (Other restrictions apply.) The region hopes to have a fully integrated region-level transit system by the end of the decade.

Niagara Falls, St. Catharines and Grimsby are all connected to the CN railway line. Via Rail offers limited daily commuter and weekend service between these three peninsula municipalities and Toronto and many points between. Via Rail and Amtrak also offer daily southbound service from Toronto to New York City with stops at the same stations.

== Maritime infrastructure ==
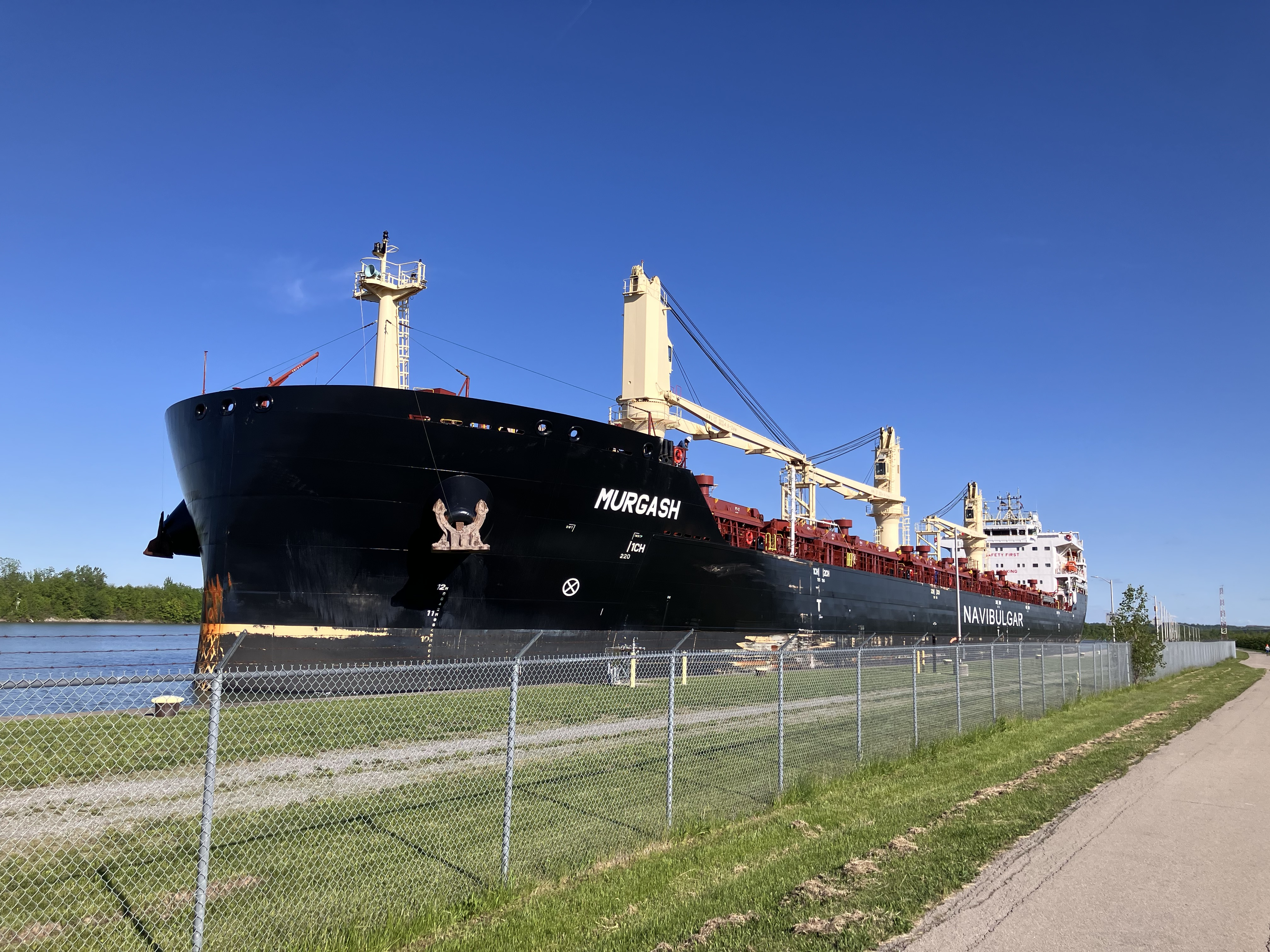
The Murgash passing through the Welland Canal

The Niagara Region also possesses significant maritime shipping infrastructure. The region is home to Port Weller, Port Colborne, the Welland Canal, and the largest Canadian Great Lakes port, in Hamilton.

== See also ==
- Niagara, St. Catharines and Toronto Railway
- Toronto, Hamilton and Buffalo Railway
