= Canadian wine =

Wine making in Canada

Canadian wine is mainly produced in Ontario and British Columbia, the two largest wine-producing provinces in Canada, with two-thirds of Canada's vineyard acreage situated in Ontario. However, wine producing regions are also present in other provinces, including Alberta, Quebec, New Brunswick, Nova Scotia, and Prince Edward Island.

In 2015, Canada produced 56.2 million litres of wine, with 62 per cent of that total originating from Ontario. The second largest wine-producing province, British Columbia, constitutes 33 per cent of Canada's wine production. Between 2006 and 2011, 68 per cent of Canadian wine exports came from Ontario-based wineries; with 14 per cent of exports originating from British Columbia, 12 per cent from Quebec, and six per cent from Alberta.

Ice wine can be produced reliably in most Canadian wine-producing regions. As a result, Canada is the world's leading icewine producer, with more icewine produced in Canada than all other countries combined. More than 90 per cent of Canadian icewines originates from Ontario, although the product is also produced in British Columbia, Quebec, and Nova Scotia. In addition to standard grape wines, and icewines, the country is also home to several fruit wineries and meaderies, found in provinces such as Alberta, Saskatchewan and Manitoba, whose local climate is not favourable for grape production.

== History ==
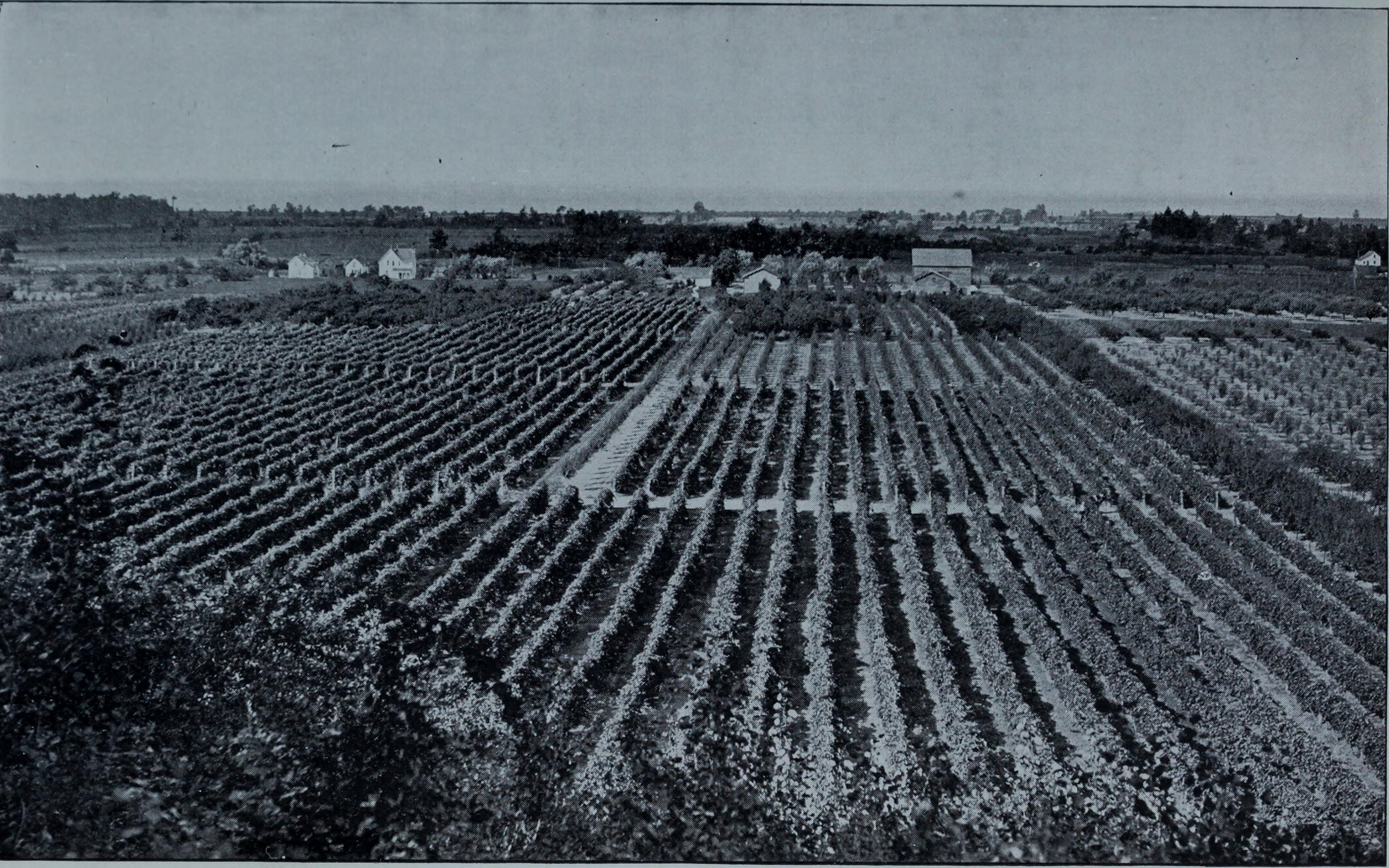
A vineyard in Canada, 1905. The first commercial winery was opened in Canada in the mid-19th century.

Canadian wine has been produced for over 400 years. In 1611, Louis Hérbert planted a hillside vineyard near what is today, Bear River, Nova Scotia. He and other settlers tried to cultivate Vitis vinifera grapes from Europe with limited success. They found it necessary to focus on the native species of Vitis labrusca and Vitis riparia along with various hybrids. However, the market was limited for such wines because of their peculiar taste which was often called "foxy". However, this became less apparent when the juice was made into Port- and Sherry-styled wines. In 1866, the first commercial winery opened in Canada, situated on Pelee Island in Ontario.

=== International Domestic Blend ===
This is a term for wine from Canadian wineries, whose grapes must be sourced either partially or entirely from outside of Canada. Canadian wineries which existed in 1994 are allowed to import pre-fermented grape must from other countries, and use it to produce wine under their own brands. The maximum quantity of foreign wine used in these wines depended on the province the wine originated from, with certain provinces requiring a minimum amount of local grapes be used in order for it to qualify as "International Domestic Blend" wine. In Ontario, 30 per cent of the grapes in "International Domestic Blend" wine must be sourced from local growers. Conversely, British Columbia did not stipulate the use of local grapes in the production of its "International Domestic Blend" wines.

In late 2009, local and international criticism of this practice and the Liquor Control Board of Ontario (LCBO) emerged. Grape growers in Ontario began protesting the practice as a threat to their livelihood, claiming that thousands of tons of Canadian grapes are left rotting on the vine because producers are using imported grapes to make wine labelled as "Canadian". Wine producers who do not use the "International Domestic Blend" designation criticized the practice as tarnishing the reputation of Canadian wines and misleading consumers. Producers and growers in Canada have petitioned the government for several changes in the practices, such as making the origin of grapes more clear on the wine label and increasing the visibility of 100 per cent Canadian wines produced by members of the Vintners Quality Alliance (VQA) in province run liquor stores. In August 2009, the stores of Ontario's LCBO featured less than 2.5 per cent Canadian wine produced by VQA members, with the vast majority of its wines produced under the "International Domestic Blend" designation with up to 70 per cent foreign grapes.

In March 2018, the Canadian Food Inspection Agency announced the replacement of the "International Canadian Blend" designation (which had replaced the original "Cellared in Canada" designation) with two new designations, dependent on the quantity of foreign wine mixed into the product. Products that are primarily made of foreign grapes are designated "International blend from imported and domestic wines", whereas primarily domestic wines that contain foreign grapes are designated "International blend from domestic and imported wines".

== Market share ==
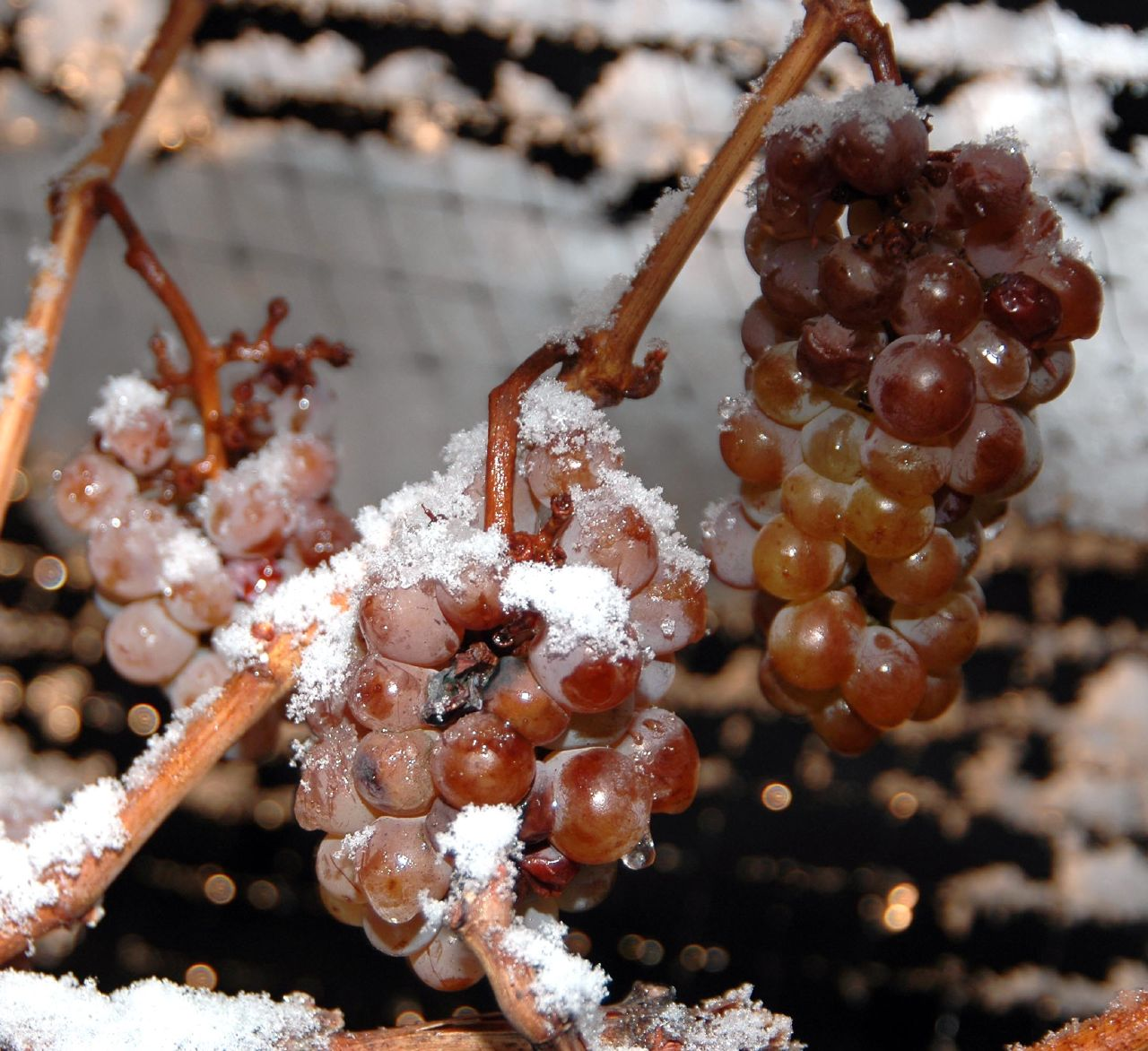
A Niagara-based winery's grapes freezing over, a process that allows for the creation of icewine. Wineries in Ontario constitute the majority of Canada's icewine exports.

As of 2015, the province of Quebec is Canada's largest consumer of wine, with each resident consuming an average of 23 litres a year. However, Canadian wines make up less than 50 per cent share of the Canadian wine market, making Canada one of the few wine-producing countries where domestically produced wines do not hold a dominant share. Wine in general has been increasing its market share against other alcoholic beverages (beer and spirits). Since the late 1990s wine has increased its market share from 21 per cent to 28 per cent and since 2007 wine sales have increased by 9.5 per cent to C$5 billion.

While there are many small Canadian wineries, the domestic wine market has long been dominated by two companies, Arterra Wines Canada (formerly Vincor International) and Andrew Peller Limited (formerly Andres Wines). In 2006, Vincor International, which had grown aggressively in previous years by acquiring wineries in California, Australia and New Zealand, was itself acquired by Constellation Brands, a U.S.-based company and one of the primary consolidators of the global wine business. In 2016, the Canadian branch of Constellation Brands was acquired by the Ontario Teachers’ Pension Plan, and renamed Arterra Wines Canada.

=== Global market ===
In 2017, Canadian wineries exported 2.1 million litres of wine (valued at C$39.6 million), and constitutes 0.1 per cent of global exports. The largest export markets for Canadian wine are China, the United States, South Korea, the Netherlands, and Japan. Between 2006 and 2011, 68 per cent of Canadian wine exports came from Ontario-based wineries; with 14 per cent of exports originating from British Columbia, 12 per cent from Quebec, and six per cent from Alberta.

Icewine is a major export product for Canadian wineries. Ontario is the largest exporter of icewine, exporting a value of C$21.3 million, followed by British Columbia, which exported a value of C$3.2 million. The majority of icewines exported to France and Switzerland originate from Ontario and Quebec. Conversely, majority of Canadian sparkling wine imported in Switzerland originates from British Columbia.

== Production ==
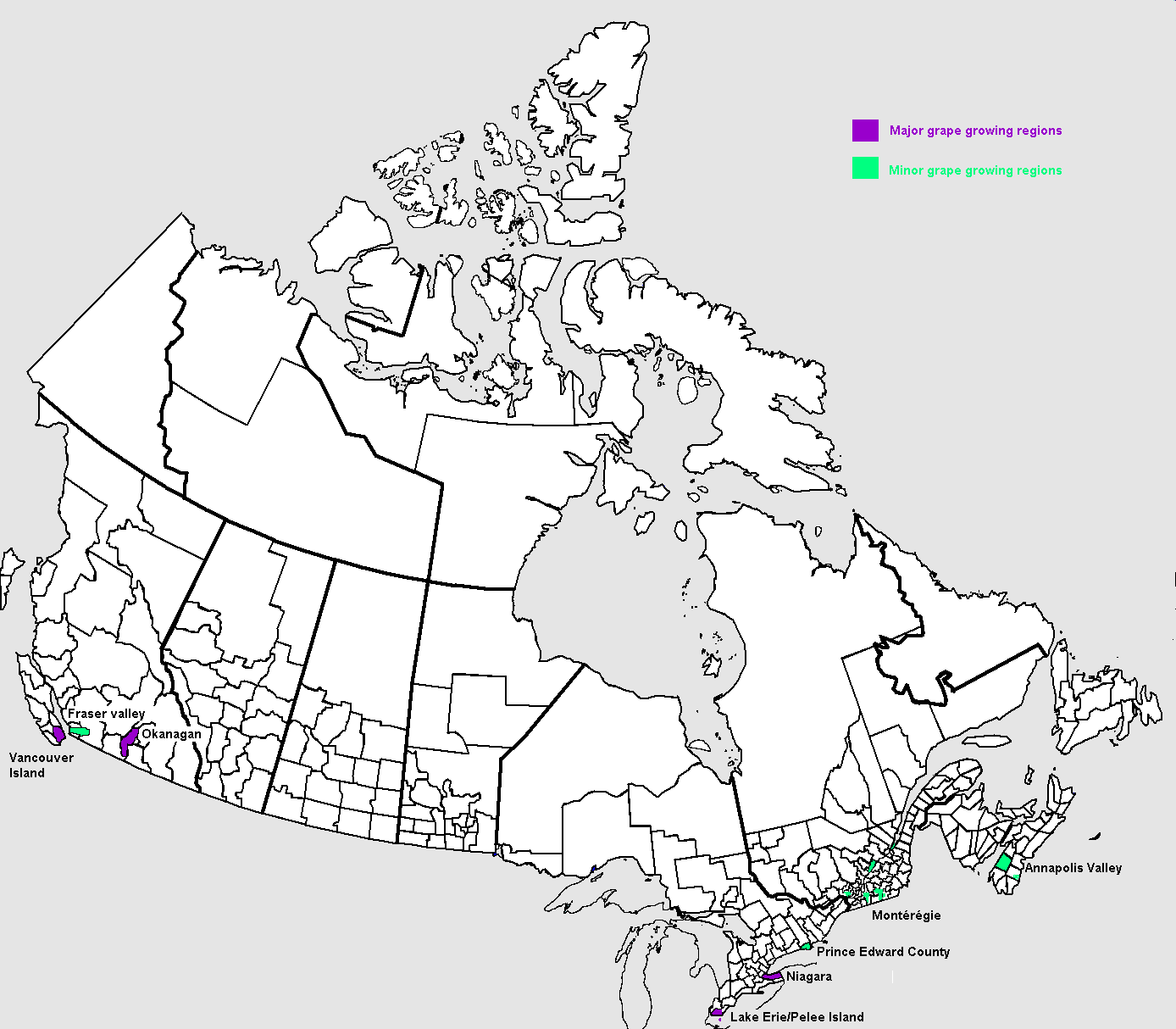
Wine regions of Canada, 2006.

In 2015, Canada produced 56.2 million litres of wine; 62 per cent of which originated from Ontario. The second largest wine-producing province, British Columbia, constitutes 33 per cent of Canada's wine production. In particular, Canada is the largest producer of icewine, with Canada producing a greater volume of icewine than all other countries combined. Icewine is made in every wine-producing region of Canada, although the majority of Canadian icewine is produced in Ontario, whose wineries constitute over 90 per cent of Canadian icewine production.

In 2015, there are 548 wineries in Canada, spread over 12,150 hectares (30,000 acres). Ontario holds the largest acreage of vineyards in Canada, with 150 vineyards spread across 6,900 hectares (17,000 acres). There are three VQA designated viticultural areas in Ontario, the Niagara Peninsula (which includes ten different sub-appellations), Prince Edward County, and the north shore of Lake Erie. Small but fast-growing wine industries can also be found in the Lambton and Huron County regions of Southwestern Ontario. Vitis vinifera is the most common grapevine grown in Ontario-based vineyards, with a focus on cultivating Chardonnay, Riesling, pinot noir, and Cabernet Franc.

British Columbia holds 240 wineries, spread throughout 4,152 hectares (10,260 acres). Wineries in British Columbia primarily grow vitis vinifera, with the top planted grapes being Chardonnay, Merlot, pinot gris, and pinot noir. There are five VQA designated viticultural regions in British Columbia, Vancouver Island, the Gulf Islands, the Fraser Valley, Similkameen Valley, and the Okanagan Valley.

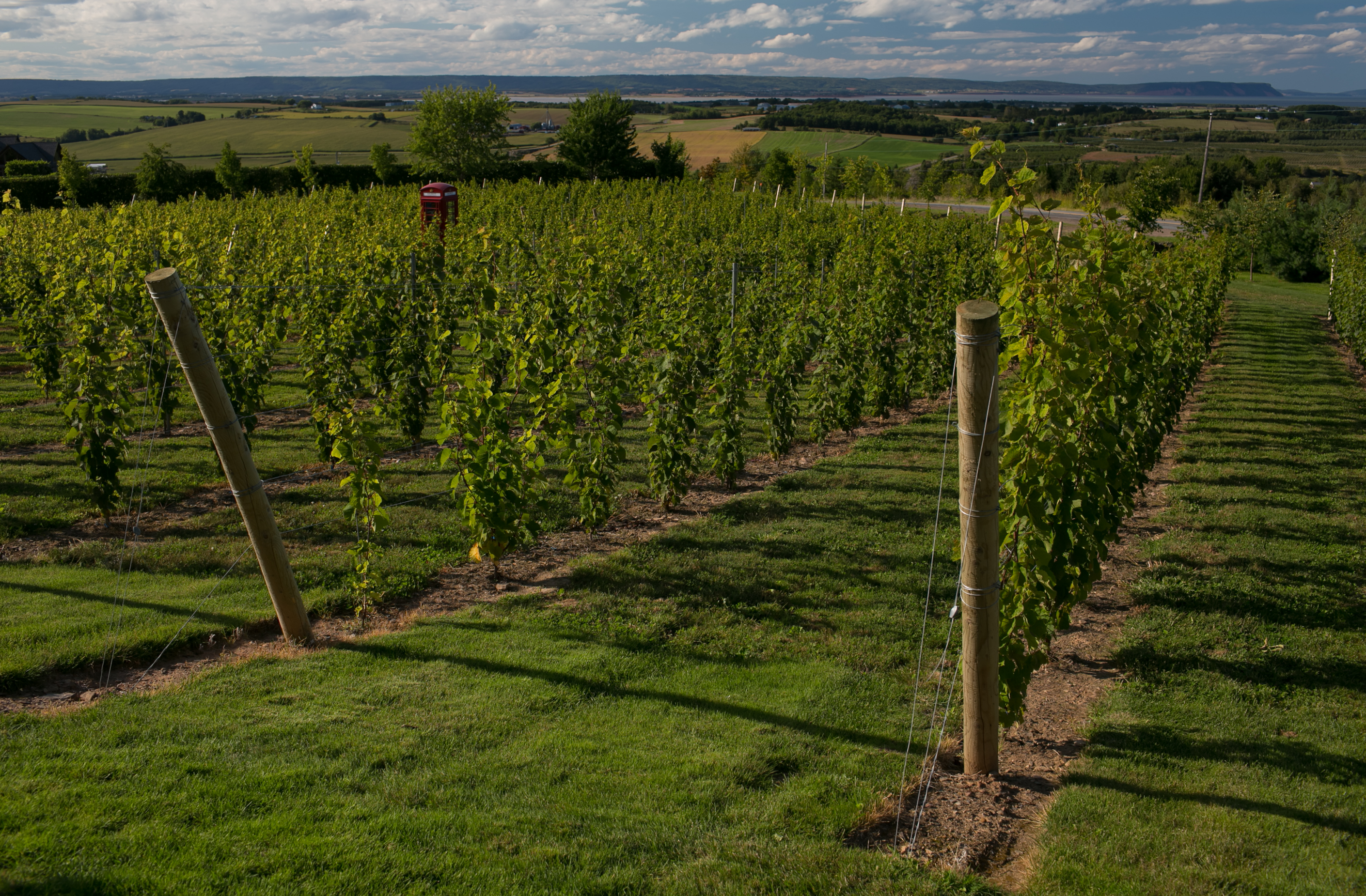
A vineyard in Gaspereau, Nova Scotia. Vineyards in Nova Scotia take up 290 hectares (720 acres) of land.

There are 138 wineries in Quebec, which manage 808 hectares (2,000 acres) of vineyards in the province. Vineyards in Quebec are primarily located to the north, and southeast of Montreal, as well as the surrounding area of Quebec City. Nova Scotia holds 20 wineries, which manages 290 hectares (720 acres) of vineyards in the province. Wine-producing areas in the province are primarily located along the shores of the Northumberland Strait, as well as Annapolis Valley. Most wineries in Nova Scotia are specialized towards the production of sparkling wine. The provinces Alberta, Manitoba, and Saskatchewan, also contain fruit wineries and meaderies.

== See also ==
- Agriculture in Canada
- Canadian beer
- Canadian whisky
- List of breweries, wineries, and distilleries in Manitoba
- Winemaking
