= Okanagan dry forests =

Ecoregion on North America's Pacific coast

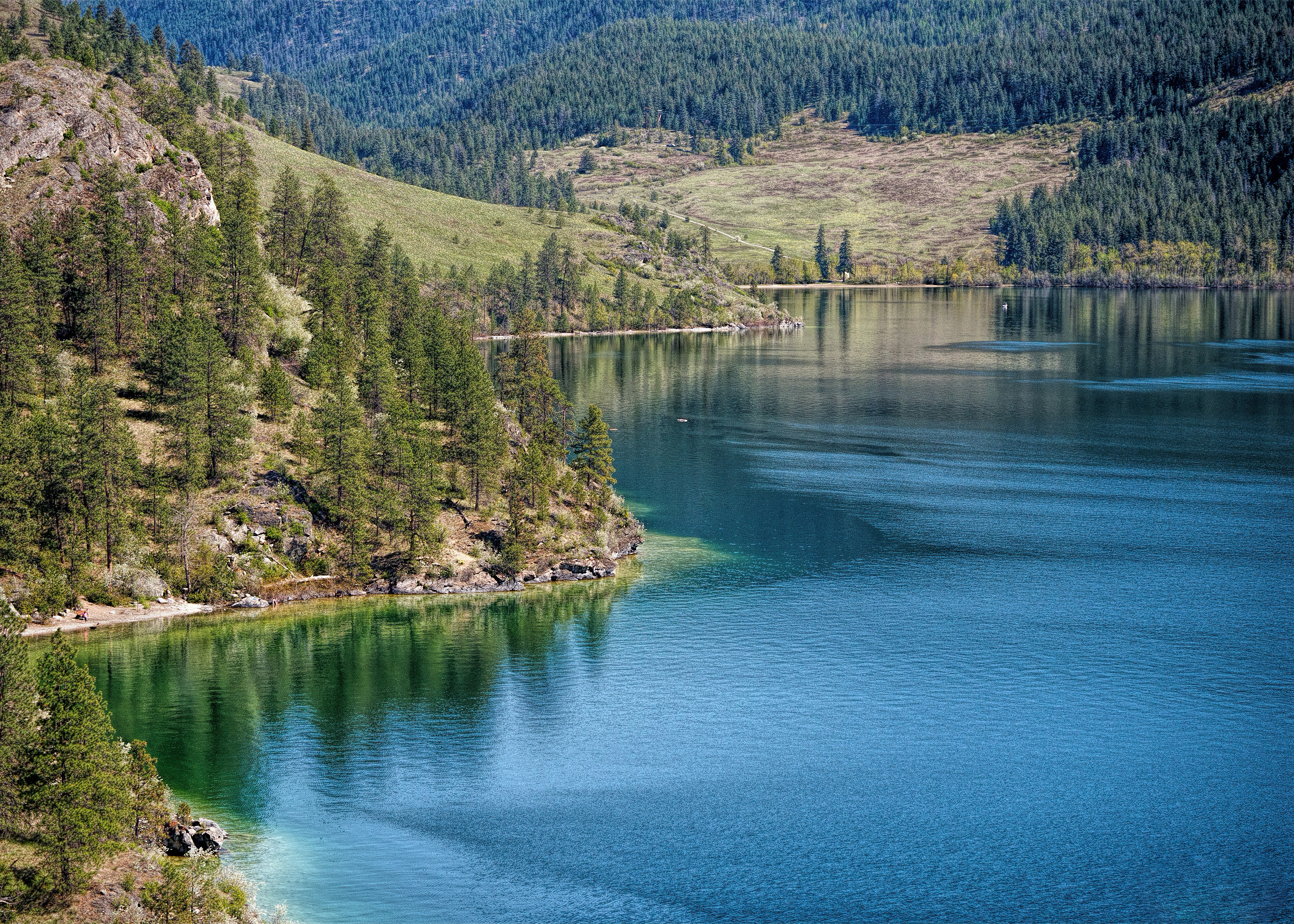
- Dry forest along the north shore of Kalamalka Lake

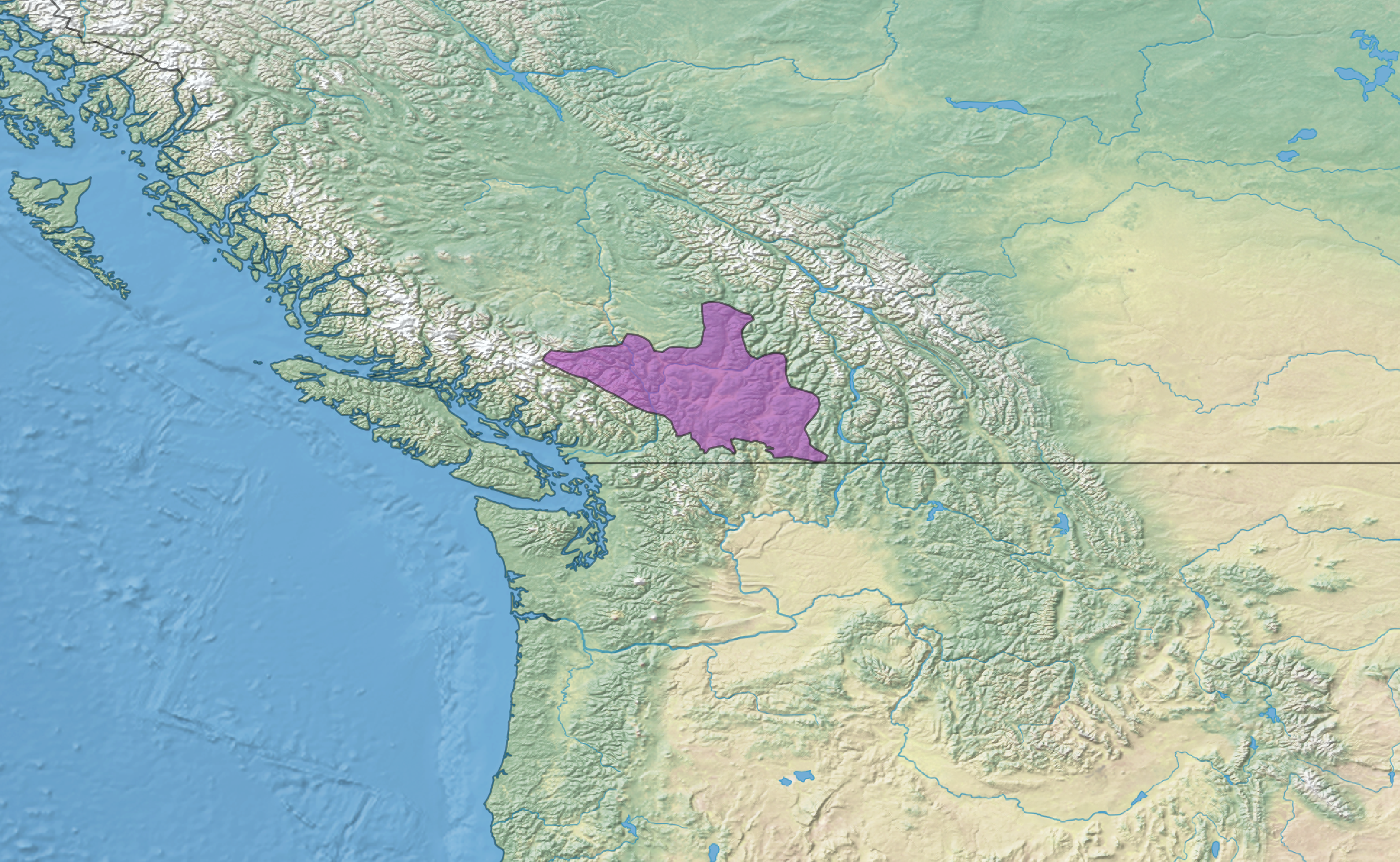
- Map of the Okanagan Dry Forests (purple)

Ecology
- Realm: Nearctic
- Biome: Temperate coniferous forests
- Borders: Cascade Mountains leeward forests; Fraser Plateau and Basin complex; North Central Rockies forests; Palouse grasslands
- Bird species: 199
- Mammal species: 79

Geography
- Area: 53,354 km^{2} (20,600 sq mi)
- Countries: Canada; United States
- States: British Columbia; Washington
- Climate type: Cold semi-arid (BSk)

Conservation
- Conservation status: Critical/Endangered
- Habitat loss: 0.5%
- Protected: 9.52%

Okanagan dry forests is a temperate coniferous forest ecoregion in the Pacific Northwest of North America, as defined by the World Wildlife Fund (WWF) categorization system. It is closely associated with the Okanagan region of British Columbia and Washington. Only 20% of the ecosystem is still intact, and continues to be under threat for preservation due to land clearing and urban expansion, alongside the increasing threats of fire and extreme weather due to climate change.

== Geography ==
This ecoregion occupies the south-central interior of British Columbia and adjacent Washington state between the Rocky Mountains to the east and the Pacific Ranges to the west. It is composed of gently rolling hills of Tertiary sediments and volcanic rocks between 1220 and 1525 metres (4000–5000 ft) in elevation. These hills are incised by numerous bodies of water such as the Columbia River, Thompson River, and Okanagan Lake.

== Climate ==
The ecoregion has a cold semi-arid climate (Köppen BSk) with very warm to hot, dry summers and moderately cold winters with some snowfall. A strong elevational gradient in precipitation occurs, ranging from 250 mm (9.8 in) to over 1000 mm (39.4 in) per year. On average, precipitation is in the range of 400 mm (15.75 in) on the plateaus. The mean annual temperature is around 7 °C (44.6 °F), mean summer temperature ranges from 15 °C (59 °F) to 16.5 °C (61.7 °F), and mean winter temperature is around -2.5 °C (27.5 °F).

The driest place in Canada outside of the Arctic is in the Kamloops region of Thompson Country, which falls within the northwestern bounds of this ecoregion.

The Okanagan dry forests ecoregion is sometimes referred to as a desert due to its hot, dry climate relative to the rest of Canada. However, it and the neighbouring Columbia Plateau ecoregion near Osoyoos are semi-arid ecoregions and are not true deserts.

== Ecology ==
=== Flora ===
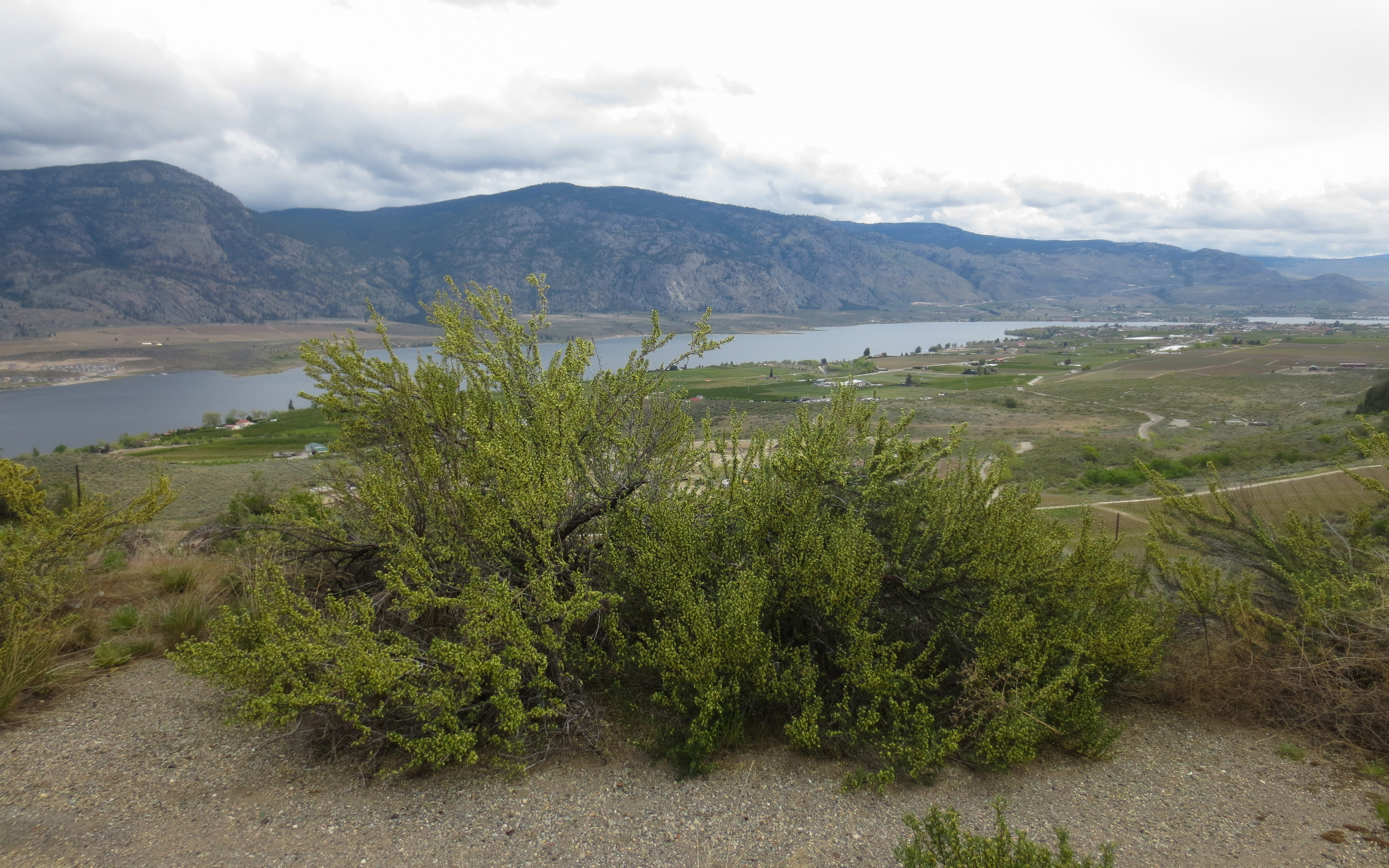
Antelope brush shrub-steppe located west of Osoyoos Lake

Vegetative cover in this region encompasses forests and grasslands that change in character with increasing altitude. Lower elevations contain communities of ponderosa pine, bluebunch wheatgrass, blue grass, June-grass, and Great Basin sagebrush. Mid-slope elevations are home to communities of Douglas-fir and pinegrass. Higher elevations are home to communities lodgepole pine, quaking aspen, white spruce, western larch, and Douglas-fir.

The southernmost portion of the ecoregion within Canada features a unique antelope brush plant community. One of the most restricted Canadian endemic species, Phemeranthus sediformis, the Okanogan fameflower, is native to the Columbia Mountains and Kettle River Range Between Kelowna and the northern Colville Reservation boarder in Washington State.

=== Fauna ===
Mammals in this region include Columbian ground squirrels (Urocitellus columbianus), bighorn sheep (Ovis canadensis), white-tailed deer (Odocoileus virginianus), mountain goats (Oreamnos americanus), American red squirrels (Tamiasciurus hudsonicus), moose (Alces alces), yellow-bellied marmots (Marmota flaviventris), and wapiti (Cervis canadensis). The population also boasts a large population of mule deer (Odocoileus hermionus) and American black bears (Ursus americanus).

== Threats and preservation ==
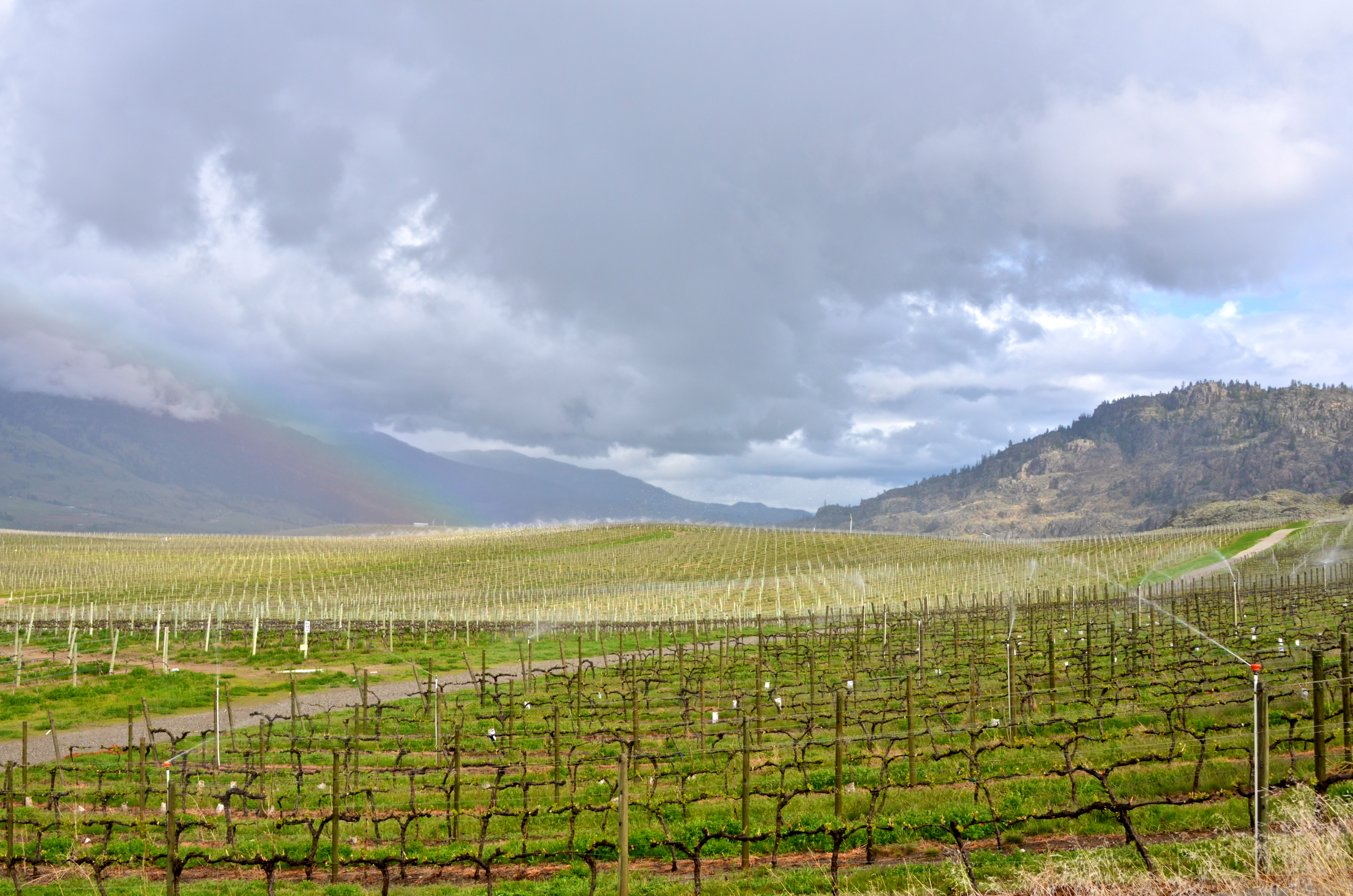
Agricultural development of the Okanagan Valley near Okanagan Falls

Approximately 20% of the Okanagan dry forests remains intact, with most parts having been heavily altered due to clearing of land for agricultural production. Growing urban expansion also threatens this ecoregion, most notably around the cities of Kamloops, Kelowna, and Spokane. Connectivity between grasslands for wildlife is heavily impaired by the development of lowland valleys.

Human-caused climate change threatens to increase the frequency and intensity of droughts and wildfires in this ecoregion. Wildfires of note include the 2003 Okanagan Mountain Park fire, 2009 West Kelowna wildfires, and 2017 British Columbia wildfires.

=== Protected areas ===
Some of the largest protected areas of this ecoregion include:

- Arrowstone Provincial Park
- Bonaparte Provincial Park
- Colville National Forest
- Lac du Bois Grasslands Protected Area
- Okanagan Mountain Provincial Park
- Riverside State Park
- White Lake Grasslands Protected Area

== See also ==
- List of ecoregions in Canada (WWF)
- List of ecoregions in the United States (WWF)
