= British Columbia wine =

Canadian wine produced in the province of British Columbia

British Columbia wine is Canadian wine produced in the province of British Columbia. Wines made from 100% British Columbia grapes can qualify for classification under one of British Columbia's two classification systems, depending on the variety, the winemaking techniques employed, and various other restrictions.

Originally, the British Columbia Wine Institute handled regulation and marketing of the Vintners Quality Alliance (VQA), which is also an appellation system. More recently, the British Columbia Wine Authority was formed by the provincial government to regulate part of the industry. It created a second classification, "Wines of Distinction", to be also from 100 percent British Columbia grapes, but with less stringent quality control. In practice, it has strengthened the VQA classification.

Wines which are neither labelled VQA or Wine of Distinction, and from certain producers (given special rights under the 1988 Canada-United States Free Trade Agreement), can use foreign bulk wine to produce a third category of wine which is labelled as Cellared in Canada. Significant parts of the wine industry, and respected wine writers in Canada and abroad, are quite concerned about this practice.

There are several classifications of winery, represented by numerous organizations. The smallest are known as "farmgate" wineries. "Land" wineries are mid-sized operations.

== Climate ==
Although Canada has a reputation for having a cold climate, much of the British Columbia Interior has a mild or dry climate which is ideal for growing grapes. Within the Interior, the Okanagan Valley in particular is known for both the high quality of its wines, and for its increasing number of respected wineries, smaller pockets such as the Creston Valley have been emerging of late, with very high quality first epoch vitis vinifera varietals. On the Coast, the Cowichan Valley and Saanich Peninsula on Vancouver Island, the Gulf Islands, and the Fraser Valley in the Lower Mainland are also wine-growing regions. Experimentation with vines has also happened in various other southerly areas of the province.

== Varieties ==
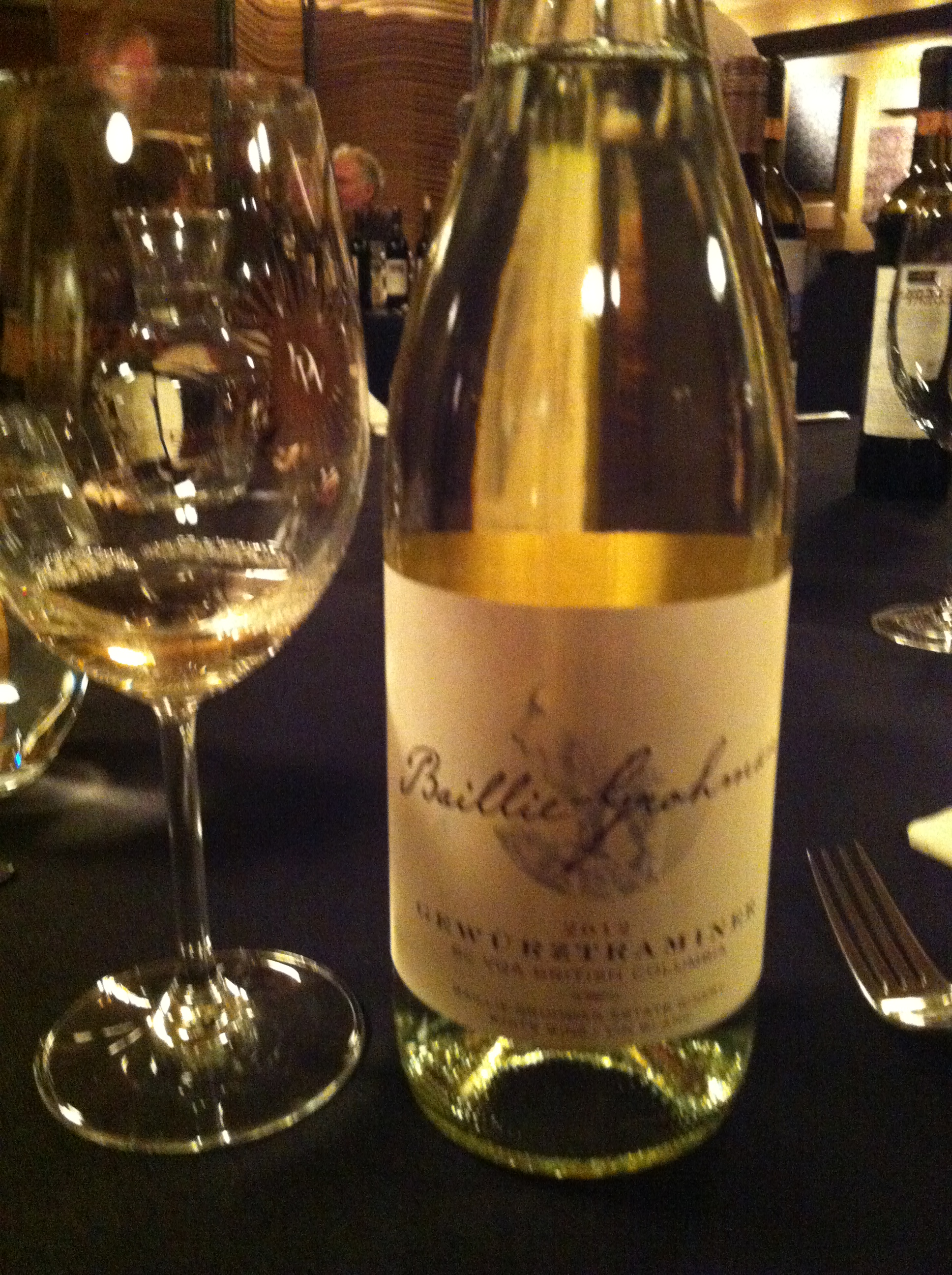
A Gewürztraminer from British Columbia.

The most prominent varieties of grapes grown in British Columbia are:

For red wine and rosé production:

- Merlot
- Pinot noir
- Cabernet Sauvignon
- Syrah (Shiraz)
- Cabernet Franc
- Gamay
- Marechal Foch
- Malbec
- Petit Verdot
- Zweigelt

For white wines:

- Pinot gris
- Chardonnay
- Gewürztraminer
- Sauvignon blanc
- Pinot blanc
- Riesling
- Viognier
- Ehrenfelser
- Semillon
- Bacchus

== Growing regions ==
Based on their unique terroir, there are five official viticultural areas in the province which are recognized by the VQA. Wines bearing the name of a viticultural area are produced from a minimum of 95 percent of the grapes grown in the designated area.

- Okanagan Valley
- Similkameen Valley
- Fraser Valley
- Vancouver Island (including Cowichan Valley and Saanich Peninsula)
- Gulf Islands

There are also emerging regions:

- Kootenay
- Thompson/Shuswap
- Lillooet

== Association of BC Winegrowers ==
The Association of British Columbia Winegrowers (ABCW) is an association of winemakers located in British Columbia. Most of the member wineries are small lot producers (less than 5,000 cases produced each year), family owned and operated. Their wines are all made from 100% BC-grown fruit. The ABCW's 57 members account for over 70% of the province's wineries.

== See also ==
- Blasted Church Vineyards
- Blue Mountain Vineyard
- Cool Climate Oenology and Viticulture Institute
- Ice wine
- Jackson-Triggs
- Ontario wine
- Nova Scotia wine
- Quebec wine
- Quails' Gate Winery
