= White Lake Grasslands Protected Area =

Protected area in British Columbia

- IUCN category II (national park)
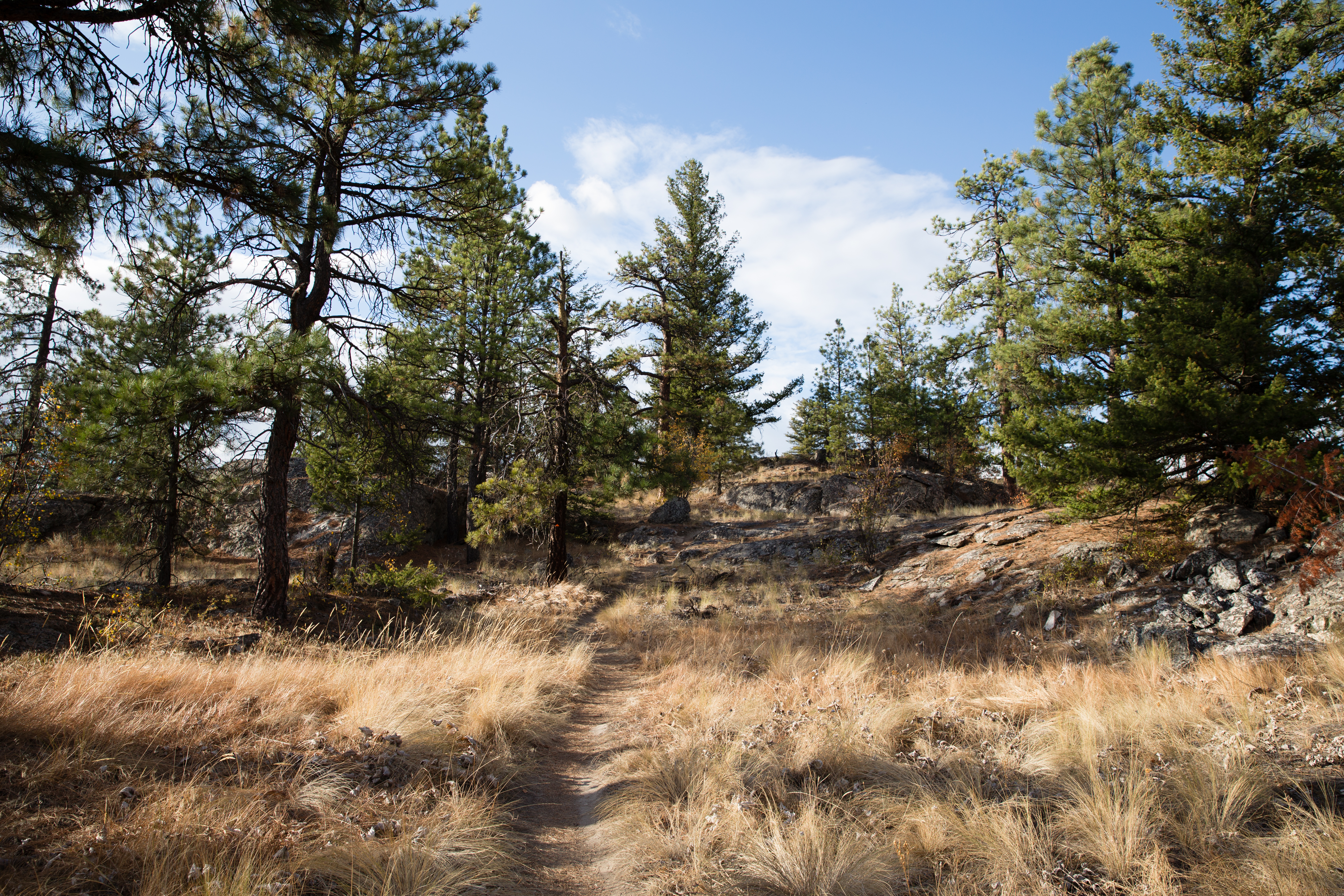
- Trail leading up to McIntyre Bluff

- Location within British Columbia
- Interactive map of White Lake Grasslands Protected Area
- Location: Okanagan-Similkameen RD, British Columbia, Canada
- Nearest city: Okanagan Falls
- Coordinates: 49°17′37″N 119°35′49″W
- Area: 3,764 ha (14.53 sq mi)
- Designation: Protected Area
- Established: April 18, 2001
- Governing body: BC Parks

White Lake Grasslands Protected Area is a conservation site located in the Regional District of Okanagan-Similkameen of British Columbia, Canada. It was established on April 18, 2001 by an order-in-council under the Environment and Land Use Act to protect the semi-arid grassland and pine forest ecosystem west of Vaseux Lake.

The region spans from the lake's shoreline to its mountain tops, providing protection and essential ecosystems for various red and blue-listed endangered species native to British Columbia. Additionally, the area encompasses archaeological sites and land traditionally occupied by the First Nations.

== History and past use of the area ==
The land was first recommended for protection by Okanagan-Shuswap Land & Resource Management in 2000 and was established as a Class A provincial park on April 18, 2001, under the Environment and Land Use Act. The overall aim of the land's classification is to protect the ecosystems and rare or endangered species located in the Southern Okanagan Basin.

=== First Nations ===
Historically, the White Lake Grasslands Protected Area has encompassed parts of the traditional territory and ancestral homelands of a number of First Nations, including the Syilx Okanagan Nation and the Nlaka'pamux Nation Tribal Council. First Nations Territories have existed and have been inhabited for approximately ten thousand years. The White Lake Grasslands Protected Area drew significant interest from settlers during the 1850s gold rush, leading to the displacement of the Syilx/Okanagan people and the loss of their essential resources and territory. During the period, intense cattle grazing caused damage to the grasslands, resulting in the replacement of native grasses with low-growing, graze-resistant shrubs, leafy forbs, and invasive plants.

One of the aims of the White Lake Grasslands Protected Area is to preserve and protect traditional lands of the First Nations. Since the conclusion of colonialism and European settlement, the Nation Park located in South Okanagan has been co-managed by the Syilx/Okanagan Nation. The Nation provides leadership on conservation and economic goals, and also participates in traditional land use and spiritual activities.

== Geography ==
White Lake Grasslands Protected Area is divided into five sites with a total area of 37.64 km^{2}. It is located west of the Okanagan River to the McIntyre Bluff and includes Mt. McLellan, Mount Hawthorne, and Mt. Keogan. The St. Andrews Golf Course on the east side of Mt. Parker is also protected. Surrounding communities include White Lake, Green Lake, and Okanagan Falls, and other unprotected provincial parks. Visitors can access the protected area through Green Lake Road and Fairview-White Lake Road.

== Climate and the effects of climate change ==
The area is located within the South Okanagan Basin Ecosection, which features a hot, xeric climate originating from the Ponderosa Pine biogeoclimatic zone (PPxhl). The forest zone is sited in the narrow band, which is known for having the driest and warmest valleys of the Southern Interior. During the growing season, there are significant moisture shortages due to the hot and dry summers. Winters are mild with light snow. The zone has a mean annual precipitation of 280–500 mm, with 15-40% as snowfall.

Heatwaves, wildfires, and droughts brought on by climate change pose a potential threat to grasslands. Climate change could lead to longer periods of droughts and extreme weathers, such as intense storms. Thus, the soil moisture level could impact vegetation growth, which is critical for the survival of species. This region has an overflowing amount of species at risk that inhabit mid-elevation grasslands and old-growth ponderosa pines.

To mitigate the impacts of climate change on the ecosystem, natural vegetation and water bodies throughout the region should be protected to increase the capacity of the soil to hold more water, which prevents droughts and floods, decreases debris and soil run-off, and naturally filters water.

== Management ==
The protected area is classified as IUCN Management Category II under the national designation. It is designated as a protected area for terrestrial and inland waters. Its management authority is under the oversight of the Government of British Columbia, which operates within the jurisdiction of a sub-national ministry or agency.

Framework from the Protected Area Strategy (PAS) recognizes the province's ecologically representative sites. Areas that need to be protected are identified with the guidance of the Okanagan-Shuswap Land and Resource Management Plan (OSLRMP). The Management Direction Statement (MDS), which gathers opinions from stakeholders and interested parties, leads the management strategy in this protected area.

All development related to these statements is in line with BC Parks' Impact Assessment Policy.

=== Conservation goals ===
The Okanagan Valley is one of Canada's most threatened ecosystems, making the White Lake Grasslands Protected Area crucial for the survival of species such as the White-headed woodpecker.

Regulations of the area:

- Restrict Urban expansion and hunting (restrictions on First Nation's traditional, spiritual and cultural uses on land are relaxed).
- Protect natural vegetation, grasslands, and water bodies.
- Diversify the economies of local communities through investments, job opportunities, and tourism.
- Protect the eight known First Nations archaeological sites.

There are many obstacles to managing the White Lake Grasslands Protected Area, including:

- Uneven distribution and shape of the protected land
- Insufficient public knowledge in protecting the land
- Over-access by tourists
- Ineffective fire management
- Off-road vehicle use poses significant challenges, damaging ecosystems and putting pressure on endangered species, some of which may even result in roadkill

With staff to oversee and enact rules, the national park reserve would guarantee the safety of places that are vulnerable to danger. In consultations with the Syilx/Okanagan Nation, the Wilderness Committee suggests expanding the park limits to include Vaseux Lake, White Lake, and the adjacent territories in the national park reserve.

== Ecology ==
=== Trees, shrubs, forbs and grasses ===
This table lists the plant species that can be found during the drier and wetter phases:

Phase	Trees	Shrubs	Forbs and grasses
Dry	Pinus ponderosa (ponderosa pine)	Amelanchier alnifolia (saskatoon), artemisia tridentata (big sage), A. frigida (pasture sage), chrysothamnus nauseosus (rabbit brush)	Festuca saximontana (rocky mtn. fescue), festuca idahoensis (Odaho fescue), crepis atrabarba (slender hawksbeard), Astragalus miser (timber milk-vetch), agropyron spicatum (bluebunch wheatgrass), balsamorhiza sagittata (balsamroot), and Achillea millefolium (yarrow)
Wet	Pinus ponderosa (ponderosa pine), pseudotsuga menziesii (douglas-fir)	Amelanchier alnifolia (saskatoon), Symphoricarpos albus (snowberry), rosa spp. (roses), acer glabrum (douglas maple), mahonia aquifolium (tall oregon-grape), and cornus stolonifera (res-osier dogwood)	Agropyron spicatum (bluebunch wheatgrass), Koeleria macrantha (June grass), poa sandbergii (sandberg's bluegrass), and Antennaria dimorpha (pussytoes)

=== Birds ===
There are 183 bird species in the area, including one globally threatened species, seven introduced species, and two rare/accidental species.

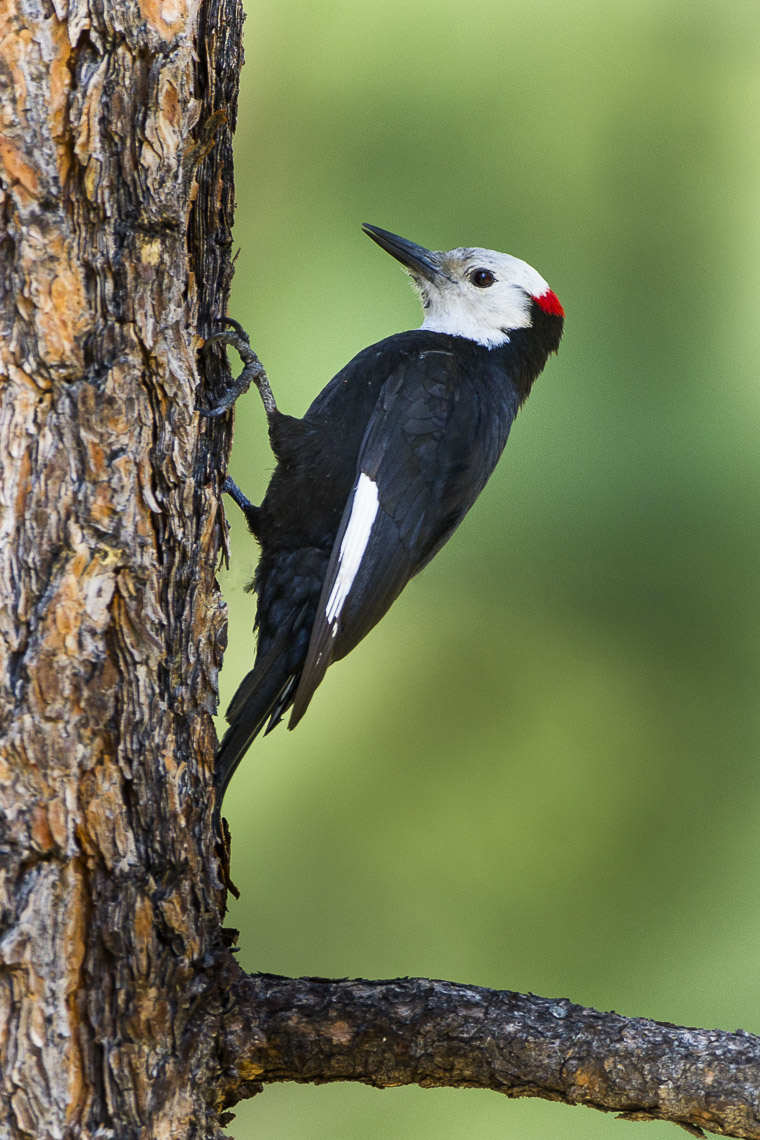
White-headed woodpeckers

Globally threatened species	Introduced species
Picoides allbolarvatus (white-headed woodpecker) *listed as Endangered in 2000, reassessed as a priority of conservation in 2013	Callipela california (California quail), Perdix perdix (gray partridge), Phasianus colchicus (ring-necked pheasant), Alectoris chukar (chukar), Streptopelia decaocto (Eurasia collared-dove), Sturnus vulgaris (European starling), Passer domesticus (house sparrow)

Rare/accidental species: Himantopus mexicanus (black-necked stilt), Spinus psaltria (lesser goldfinch)

=== Endangered species ===
Many species of red and blue-listed endangered wildlife inhabit the protected area. These include two amphibian species, five reptile species, fifteen bird species, eight mammal species, two insect species and three plant species in the park.

==== Mammals ====
Red listed	Blue listed
Taxidea taxus (badger), lepus townsendii (white-tailed jackrabbit)	Ovis canadensis californiana (California bighorn)*, myotis thysanodes (fringed myotis)**, sylvilagus nuttallii (nuttall's cottontail)**, euderma maculatum (spotted bat)**, corynohinus townsendii (townsend's big-eared bat), reithrodontomys megalotis (western harvest mouse)***

==== Amphibians ====
Red listed	Blue listed
Ambystoma tigrinum (tiger salamander)	Spea intermontana (great basin spadefoot toad)**

==== Reptiles ====
Red listed	Blue listed
Hypsiglena torquata (desert night snake)*	Pituophis catenifer deserticola (gopher snake), chrysemys picta (painted turtle), coluber constrictor (racer), charina bottae (rubber boa), Crotalus viridis (western rattlesnake)

==== Insects ====
Red listed	Blue listed
Argia vivida (vivid dancer)	Callophrys affinis (immaculate green hairstreak)

==== Plants ====
Red listed	Blue listed
Agastache urticifolia (nettle-leaved giant-hyssop), Pyrrocoma carthamoides var. carthamoides (Columbia goldenweed)	Epipactis gigantea (giant helleborine)

*Observation within 500m of Protected Area, but not recorded within the boundary

**Species of special concern

***Includes both * & **

== Tourism ==
The White Lake Grasslands Protected Area is located in Kelowna, the capital of the Okanagan. It is situated on the eastern shore of Okanagan Lake, and provides a range of outdoor recreation activities. There are several wilderness trails, including the White Lake Trail which starts from the Nature Trust property south of the lake and two routes to the summit of Mount Keogan, which is near the Mahoney Ecological Reserve. Additionally, wildlife viewing, particularly bird watching, is a key part of activity in the protected area. Valued sites are Kearns Creek, Mahoney Lake, Rattlesnake Lake, Mclntyre Bluff and Myers Flats. Several existing nature appreciation activities, such as cycling, horseback riding, and cross-country skiing. Hunting is accessible but is limited to BC Hunting & Trapping Regulations Synopsis.

Okanagan Mountain Provincial Park and Myra-Bellevue Provincial Park are located near Okanagan, and Fintry Provincial Park is near the White Lake Grasslands Protected Area. These parks provide high-value rare species and outdoor recreation activities, similar to what The White Lake Grasslands Protected Area provides.

== See also ==
- Lac du Bois Grasslands Protected Area
- South Okanagan—Similkameen National Park Reserve
