= McDougall Creek fire =

2023 wildfire in British Columbia, Canada

McDougall Creek Fire
- Part of the 2023 Canada wildfires
- Date: August 15, 2023 – September 21, 2023
- Location: Okanagan, British Columbia, Canada

Statistics
- Total area: 13,970.4 hectares (34,522 acres)

Impacts
- Deaths: 0
- Evacuated: 35,000
- Structures lost: 303

Ignition
- Cause: Under investigation

Map
- Perimeter of McDougall Creek Fire (map data)

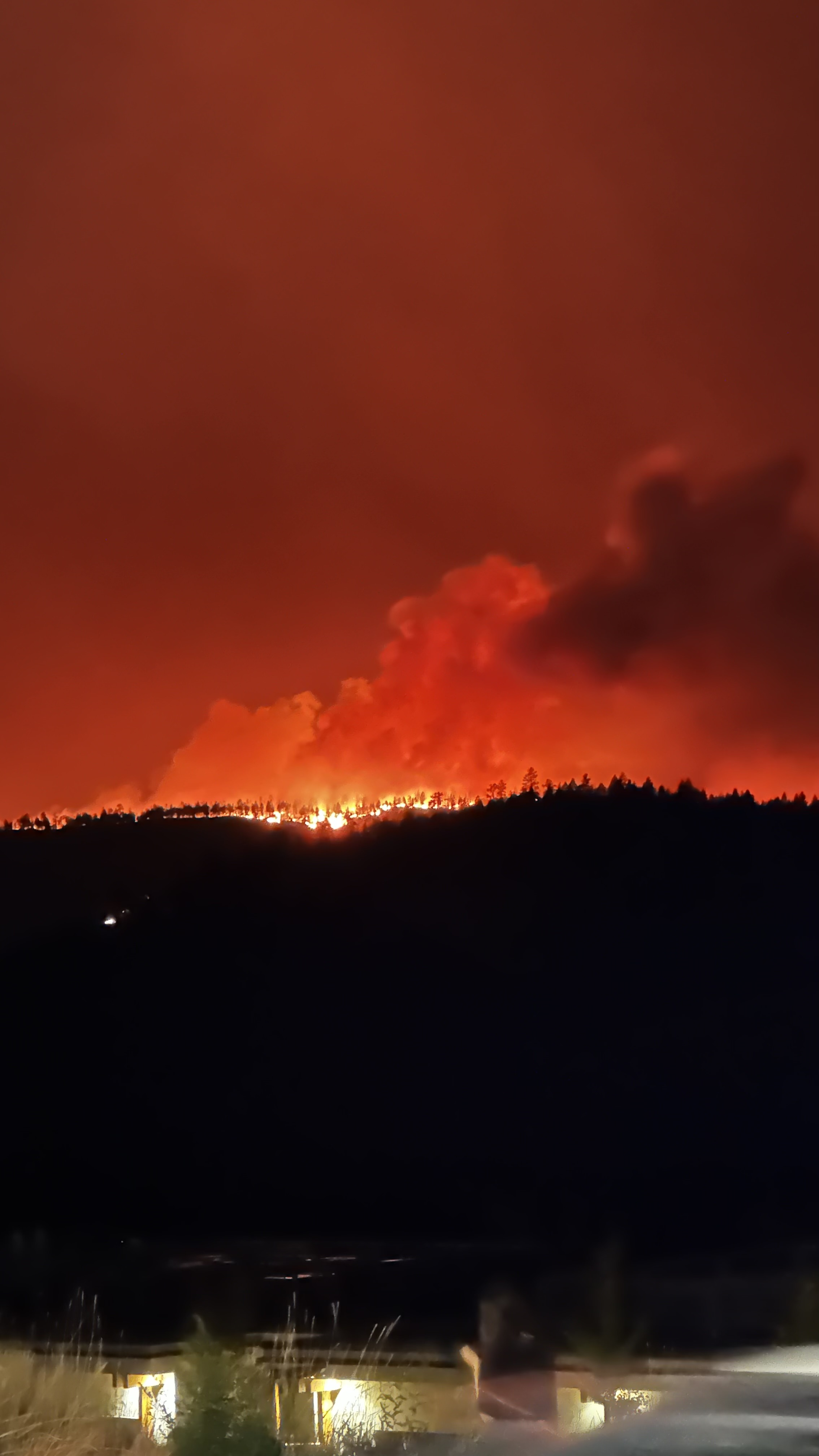
Wildfire near the University of British Columbia Okanagan on August 17, 2023

The McDougall Creek Fire was a wildfire in the Okanagan region of British Columbia, Canada as part of the 2023 Canadian wildfires. The fire sparked two other fires, Walroy Lake and Clarke Creek; together they are called the Grouse Complex. It started near West Kelowna on August 15, 2023. The wildfire was fuelled by sustained high winds and extreme drought conditions. The wildfire forced the evacuation of West Kelowna and parts of Kelowna. Overall, at least 35,000 people were under evacuation orders and another 30,000 under evacuation alerts, as of August 19. The final size of the wildfire was 13,970.4 hectares (34,522 acres).

== Background ==
Western Canada has seen a climate change-induced warming and drying trend since the mid-2000s. The province of B.C. experienced major fire seasons in 2017, 2018, and 2021, with burned areas far exceeding yearly averages. The Kelowna region experienced its driest summer on record in 2023 with approximately 10 millimetres (0.39 in) of rain in total between July 1 and August 17.

August 17 was a very hot and dry day with high winds. Temperatures reached 36 °C (97 °F) and the relative humidity had dropped to 17%. Wind speeds were recorded at 20 kilometres per hour (12 mph) with gusts to 50 kilometres per hour (31 mph). By late afternoon, a low-pressure system and cold front approached the region from the west coast of British Columbia, bringing with it strong sustained winds and turbulence.

The McDougall Creek fire was one of the many wildfires in the province during that period, the same cold front that approached Kelowna caused a massive expansion of the Bush Creek East fire in the nearby Shuswap Lake area to the northwest. The province announced on Thursday, August 17 that it was "the most challenging 24 to 48 hours this summer".

== Spread ==
At 5:59 pm on August 15, the McDougall Creek fire was discovered about 10 km northwest of West Kelowna and reported to the B.C. Wildfire Service. On the evening of August 17, 2023, a constant wind gust caused the wildfire to rapidly spread across the mountains.

At 1:25 pm PT on August 17, the evacuation alert was expanded, and an evacuation order was issued by the City of West Kelowna for 68 properties. Throughout the evening of August 17, further evacuation orders were issued by emergency officials.

=== Grouse Complex ===
At around 9:55 pm, August 17, the wildfire jumped over Okanagan Lake sparking two new wildfires north of downtown Kelowna, forcing a state of emergency by the city and further evacuations. The Walroy Lake fire started on the eastern side of Okanagan Lake near the neighbourhood of Glenmore Highlands, and the Clarke Creek wildfire started near Okanagan Centre, west of Lake Country. Together, the three fires were named the Grouse Complex.

Just after 10:20 am PT, August 18, Kelowna International Airport announced that they were suspending flights to and from the airport until further notice. Just after 6:15 pm, August 18, Premier David Eby declared a state of emergency due to the changing and worsening fire condition. The province also advised against nonessential travel to the BC Interior.

On August 19, the province announced in a ministerial order that non-essential travels into the B.C. Interior and southeast B.C. would be restricted until September 4, 2023. The order restricts accommodations such as hotels, inns, motels, provincial parks, RV parks, bed and breakfasts, and public campgrounds in West Kelowna, Kelowna, Kamloops, Osoyoos, Oliver, Penticton, and Vernon to essential purposes only.

On August 23, the province lifted most wildfire-related travel restrictions in the southern interior, with the exception of West Kelowna. Bowinn Ma, Minister of Emergency Management and Climate Readiness, urged people to continuously avoid fire-affected communities and respect evacuation orders and alerts.

As of September 1, the wildfire was estimated at 13,712 hectares in size and still classified as out of control. The wildfire was still actively burning along the west and southwest flanks. On September 21, the B.C. Wildfire Services reported that the wildfire was "being held" and that was fire was "not likely to spread past predetermined boundaries under current conditions." The area restriction order remained in place until October 3. However, four regional district parks remained closed to the public.

== Damage ==
303 structures were impacted by the fire, including homes and outbuildings. 70 homes were lost in the City of West Kelowna, 20 in the Westbank First Nation, 3 in the City of Kelowna, and 2 in the District Municipality of Lake Country. The unincorporated lakeside communities of Traders Cove and Wilson's Landing saw the heaviest losses with 100 homes destroyed. Of the 24 firefighters from Wilson's Landing that responded to the fires, 13 lost their own homes in the blaze. One of the destroyed buildings included the historic Lake Okanagan Resort. The Insurance Bureau of Canada put the total insured losses of the fire at more than 480 million Canadian dollars.

== See also ==
- 2003 Okanagan Mountain Park fire: A wildfire started on August 16, 2003, in Okanagan Mountain Provincial Park, south of the City of Kelowna
