= Vaseux Lake Provincial Park =

Provincial park in British Columbia, Canada

- IUCN category III (natural monument or feature)
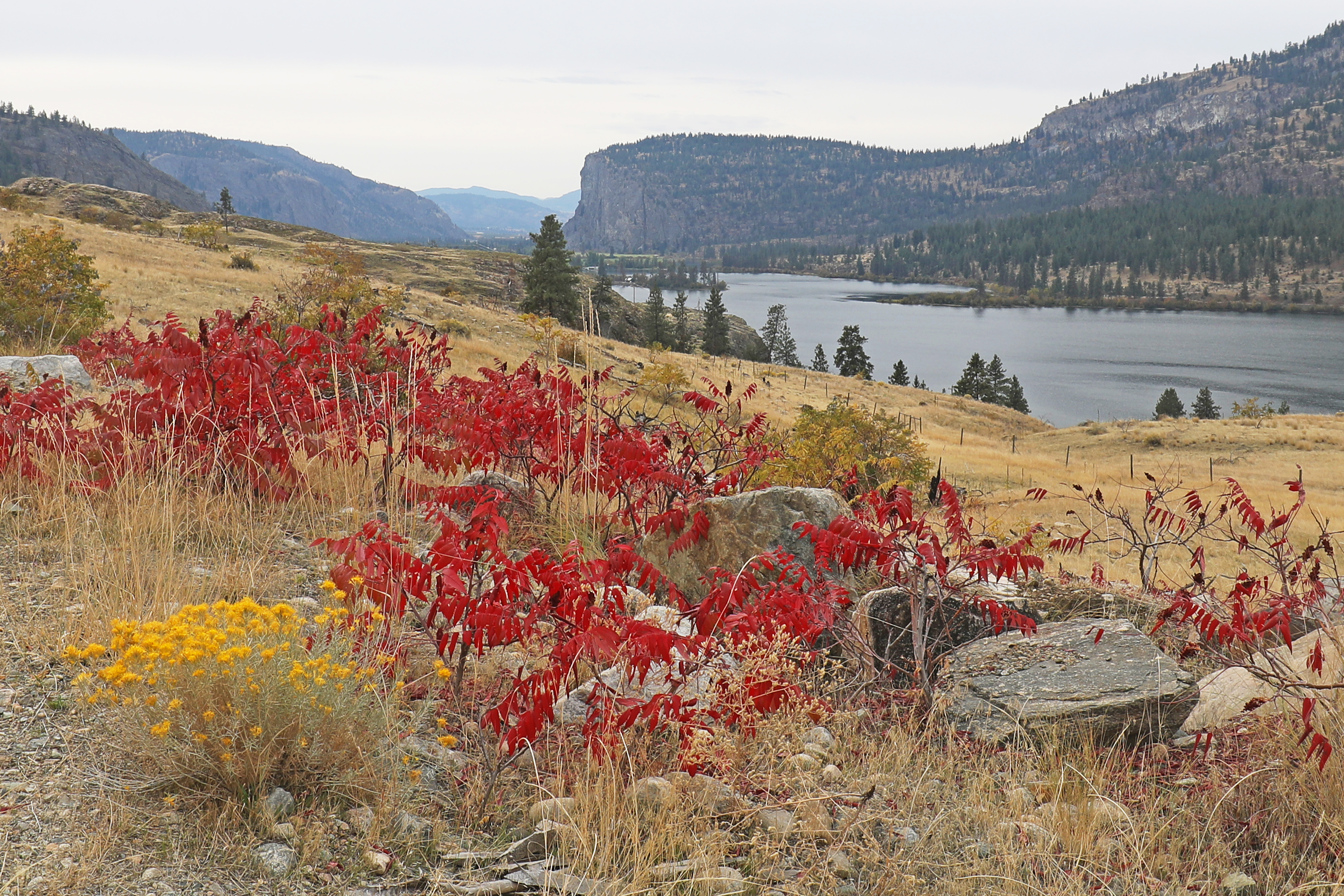
- Vaseux Lake and McIntyre Bluff as viewed from the park

- Location within British Columbia
- Interactive map of Vaseux Lake Provincial Park
- Location: Vaseux Lake, British Columbia, Canada
- Coordinates: 49°18′04″N 119°31′54″W
- Area: 12 ha (30 acres)
- Established: March 16, 1956
- Governing body: BC Parks
- Website: Vaseux Lake Provincial Park

Vaseux Lake Provincial Park is a provincial park located along the northeastern shore of Vaseux Lake in the Okanagan region of British Columbia, Canada. The park is situated 4 kilometres (2.5 mi) south of Okanagan Falls on Highway 97 in the south Okanagan. The park plays a key role in educating and providing access to important conservation values and has a responsibility to maintain these activities.

== See also ==
- Vaseux Protected Area
- Vaseux-Bighorn National Wildlife Area
