= Okanagan Mountain =

- Frog Pond at the base of a face of Okanagan Mountain

Highest point
- Elevation: 1,576 m (5,171 ft)
- Prominence: 351 m (1,152 ft)
- Coordinates: 49°42′44″N 119°36′30″W

Geography
- Location within British Columbia
- Interactive map of Okanagan Mountain
- Location: British Columbia, Canada
- District: Similkameen Division Yale Land District
- Topo map: NTS 82E12 Summerland

Okanagan Mountain is a mountain in the Okanagan region of the Southern Interior of British Columbia, Canada, located on the east side of Okanagan Lake on the immediate south of the city of Kelowna and north of Penticton. It is the core of Okanagan Mountain Provincial Park and its north slopes have also become a residential neighbourhood of Kelowna, much of which was destroyed in the Okanagan Mountain forest fire in 2003.

It is part of the Okanagan Highland, a high, hilly plateau-like area between Okanagan Lake and the Monashee Mountains.
