= Vaseux Protected Area =

Canadian provincial park

- IUCN category II (national park)
- Location within British Columbia
- Interactive map of Vaseux Protected Area
- Location: Okanagan-Similkameen, British Columbia, Canada
- Coordinates: 49°16′41″N 119°29′05″W
- Area: 2,015 ha (7.78 sq mi)
- Established: April 18, 2001
- Governing body: BC Parks
- Website: Vaseux Protected Area

Vaseux Protected Area is a protected area in the Okanagan region of British Columbia, Canada. It was established on April 18, 2001 to protect the habitats of a number of blue-listed and red-listed species, most notably the winter rangeland for California Bighorn Sheep. The protected area adds to the similarly sized Vaseux-Bighorn National Wildlife Area that was established by the Canadian Wildlife Service in 1979.

== See also ==
- Vaseux Lake
- Vaseux Lake Provincial Park
