= McIntyre Bluff =

Rocky structure in British Columbia

McIntyre Bluff (nʕaylintn)
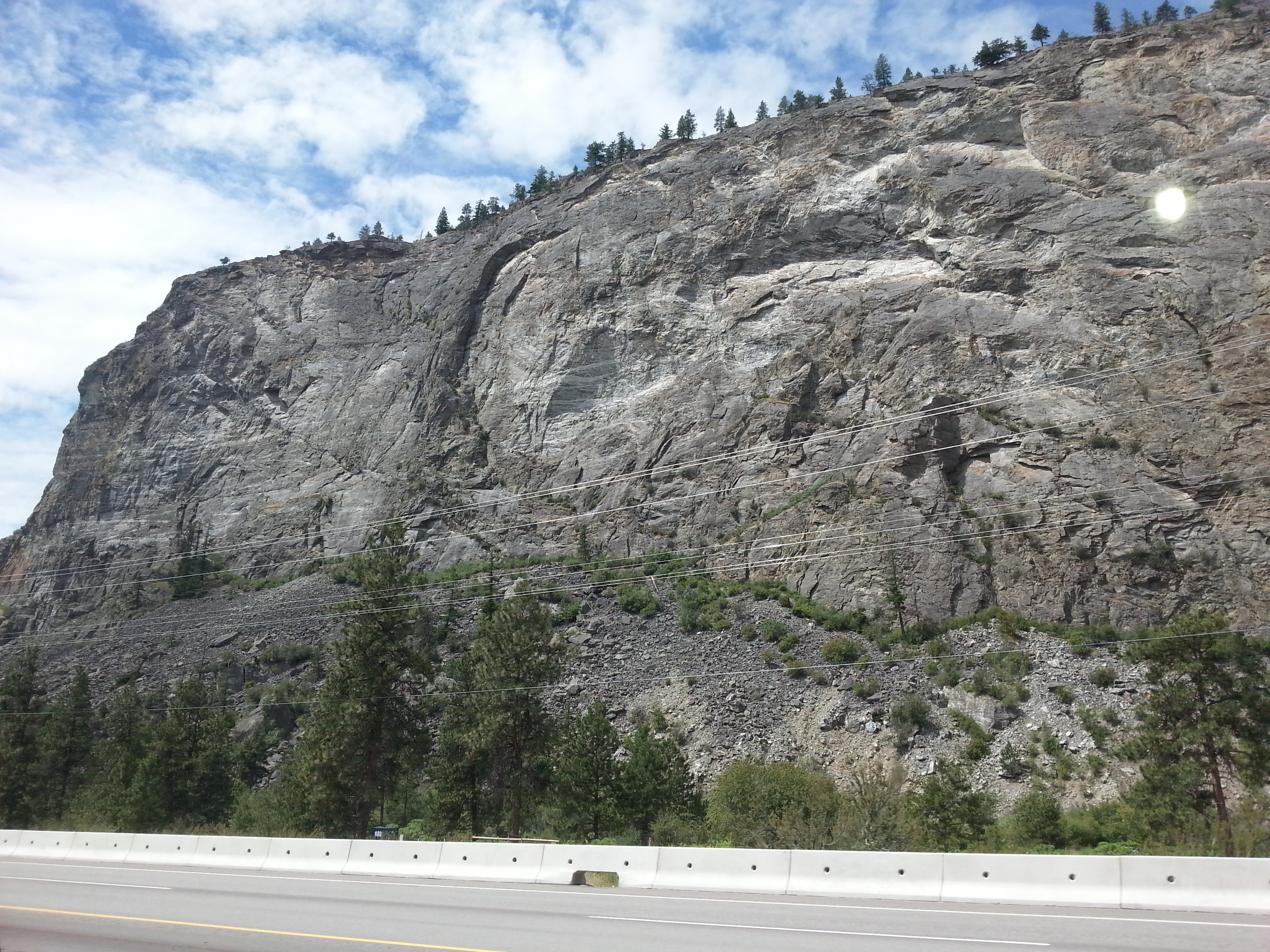
- View of McIntyre Bluff from Highway 97

Highest point
- Elevation: 673 m (2,208 ft)
- Prominence: 260 m (850 ft)
- Coordinates: 49°15′17″N 119°32′06″W

Geography
- Location within British Columbia
- Location: Okanagan, British Columbia, Canada
- Topo map: NTS 82E/5

McIntyre Bluff, officially called nʕaylintn since 7 August 2015, is a large ridge of rock, made of gneiss, located south of Vaseux Lake between Okanagan Falls and Oliver in British Columbia, Canada. The bluff rises prominently over the surrounding valley and is one of the most well known landmarks in the Okanagan.

== History ==
nʕaylintn (pronounced nye-lin-tin) is the traditional nsyilxcen (Okanagan) language place name. First Nations in the area tell a story of a battle centuries ago on top of McIntyre Bluff. An enemy war party from the south (now Washington state) was lured to the top and driven over the cliffs.

Pictographs can be found at the base of the cliffs.

McIntyre Bluff is named after Peter McIntyre, one of the Overlanders of 1862 who had also been a guard on the Pony Express in the American West. He was known as an "Indian Fighter". In 1886 he received a land grant beside this great precipice.

The official name was McIntyre Bluff from 7 October 1954 until 7 August 2015 when it was changed to nʕaylintn per request from Osoyoos Indian Band as part of agreement with British Columbia Ministry of Environment.

== Conservation ==
Most of the bluff is located within White Lake Grasslands Protected Area, which protects the Okanagan dry forests ecosystem located on top of it.

== See also ==
- Skaha Bluffs
