= Vaseux-Bighorn National Wildlife Area =

Protected natural area in British Columbia, Canada

- IUCN category IV (habitat/species management area)
- Location within British Columbia
- Location: Kootenay Boundary, British Columbia, Canada
- Coordinates: 49°17′00″N 119°33′00″W
- Area: 812 ha (2,010 acres)
- Designation: National Wildlife Area
- Established: 1979
- Governing body: Canadian Wildlife Service
- Owner: Environment and Climate Change Canada
- Website: Vaseux-Bighorn NWA

Vaseux-Bighorn National Wildlife Area is a National Wildlife Area in British Columbia, Canada, primarily set aside to protect winter rangeland for California bighorn sheep. In 1979, the Vaseux-Bighorn Wildlife Area was established in response to substantial reduction in wild animal populations in the area. Identified factors contributing to species decline at the time were high predator population, overharvesting of species, and illegal hunting. Land development, cattle raising, and lumbering also might have altered species populations. Under these conditions, the area was able to be classified as a Category IV area by the IUCN and is now used for wildlife habitat and conservation. Even with minimal anthropogenic use of the area, threats persist through invasive species. Recreational use is limited spatially and is only open to the public during the day.

== History and natural resources ==
The land that the Vaseux-Bighorn National Wildlife Area encompasses is a part of the traditional territory of the Syilx Nation. The Syilx Nation is trans-boundary because the territory includes the Okanagan region of British Columbia and parts of Northern Washington State. The territory stretches from the most northern point close to Mica Creek to its southern point near Wilbur, Washington. Guichon Creek is the western boundary while the eastern border is Kootenay Lake. The Syilx Nation is currently composed of seven communities in Canada and one confederated tribe in the United States. Vaseux-Bighorn NWA is currently and historically used as an area for gathering and hunting for the Syilx people. The plants that are found within the Vaseux-Bighorn NWA (e.g. Arrow-Leaved Balsamroot, Saskatoon Berry, Chokecherry) have a variety of uses for the Syilx people as tools, food and medicine. The wildlife that inhabited the area (e.g., waterfowl, upland game birds, fish) provided a significant food source for the Syilx people. While the resources provided by the land that the park encompasses (i.e., firewood, freshwater) allowed for the use of the land by the Syilx people.

Fire was an integral part of stewardship done by the Syilx people. Fires occurred twice a year in the spring and the fall for cultural and ecological beliefs. Fall burns were extensive controlled burns occurring every 2–15 years depending on fuel loads. In contrast, spring burns were minor and limited to small sections of land. The Syilx used fires to keep the forests open, improve wildlife habitat, and encourage the growth of plant species. Okanagan Fire Keepers were the ones who evaluated fuel loads and designed burns based on traditional knowledge about fires and ecology.

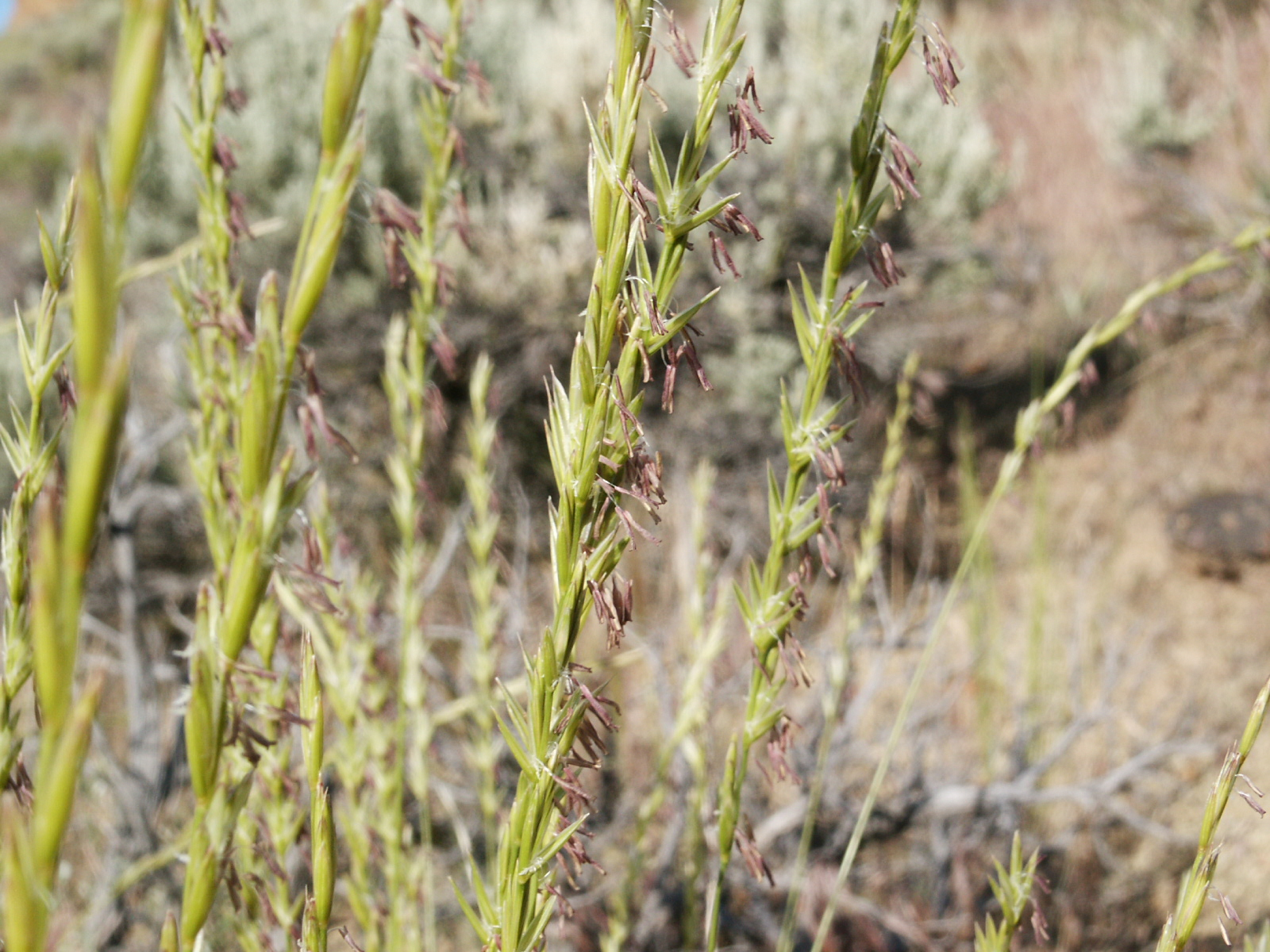
Bluebunch Wheatgrass

European Settlers arrived in the region in the early 1800s in search of resources for the fur trade and later gold. Nonetheless, colonizers only fully settled in the area over a hundred years later (in 1918), when irrigation for agriculture and subsequent villages were established. The region's mild climate, with a frost-free span between 125 and 175 days, made the area profitable for agriculture. The grassland and shrub-steppe are ideal feeding grounds for livestock, and fruit crops such as grapes for vine production flourished in the region. Despite its protection in 1979, agriculture and urban developments have transformed large parts of the area, reducing the natural plant biodiversity of the Vaseoux-Bighorn NWA and the larger South Okanagan-Similkameen region. For instance, excessive grazing led to a decrease in the native bluebunch wheatgrass and rare turf grasses. In addition, the damming of the Okanagan River in 1950 for flood control has altered the terrain of the Vaseux-Bighorn NWA and the Vaseux Lake Migratory Bird Sanctuary.

== Geography ==
Situated 25 kilometres (km) south of Penticton, B.C., between Oliver and Okanagan Falls, Vaseux–Bighorn includes the following six distinct management units:

- Irrigation Creek Unit
- Southeast Uplands Unit
- Northeast Uplands Unit
- Westside Unit
- North Wetlands Unit

== Biogeoclimatic zones and climate change ==
The Vaseux-Bighorn National Wildlife Area extends over the Bunchgrass and Ponderosa Pine Biogeoclimatic Zones of British Columbia. Both biogeoclimatic zones fall in the Coast and Purcell mountains' rain shadow, creating a dry climate in the Vaseux-Bighorn NWA with hot summers and relatively short winters. Scientists predict the southern Okanagan Valley, including the Vaseux-Bighorn NWA, to become warmer and more sensitive to heat stress under the influence of climate change. Hot summer days (over 30 Degrees Celsius) are expected to double by the 2050s and triple by the 2080s. Similarly, winter temperatures are predicted to rise in the region. The southern Okanagan Valley currently has the lowest frost span of the Okanagan Valley at 96 days on average. Under the influence of climate change, frost days are predicted to decline by 49% until the 2050s and 71% until the 2080s. Precipitation patterns are likewise expected to change in the southern Okanagan Valley. Scientists anticipate an increase in spring and fall precipitation and a 14% decrease in summer precipitation. Because the Vaseux-Bighorn area is located in the driest part of the Okanagan region, a reduction in summer precipitation could increase the likelihood of forest fires due to droughts. Severe fires during the summer months could lower air quality and alter the abundance of local plant species. Heat stress could impact ecosystem function and biodiversity in the Okanagan Basin. Desertification can also result in water shortages and wetland loss, negatively impacting aquatic species.

== Management goals ==
The goal of the creation of this protected area is to protect and conserve the wildlife. There are five goals that will lead this protected area to its goal of conservation and enhancement of habitat. The first goal is the restoration and management of critical habitats and ecosystems, particularly for species at risk, migratory birds and other priority species. The second goal is control of invasive species. To protect this area from invasive species, the government of Canada has planned to implement chemical treatment, hand-pulling, and biological control. Invasive species should be managed so that the endangered species in the area have less competition, either directly or through exploitation. With less competition, the endangered species have a higher chance of survival. The third goal is the control of unauthorized activities in the protected area (e.g., ensuring that the public walks only on designated paths). All other activities require permission. The habitat and species within this area must not be disturbed or harmed by humans to ensure the site's protection. The fourth goal is to reduce the risk of catastrophic fires in the area to ensure endangered species' survival; Therefore, the Canadian government has planned to implement controlled burns, selective logging and reduce debris and litter. The last goal is to limit anthropogenic impacts on water quality in the protected area. The areas surrounding the Vaseux-Bighorn National Wildlife area are undergoing rapid development. The areas surrounding the Vaseux-Bighorn National Wildlife area are undergoing rapid development. Protecting this area from anthropogenic threats is becoming increasingly challenging because the surrounding resources that affect the habitat should also be protected. Besides, one of the surrounding resources is water, and a river in the area has been channelled. The water in this area became contaminated by human wastewater and chemicals from agricultural drainage. The goal is the limitation of anthropogenic sources of water contamination. The Government of Canada has stated some objectives and methods to reduce threats to species within the protected area; however, methods and monitoring processes need to be more transparent. Therefore, the results of the management goals are not available.

== Species at risk ==
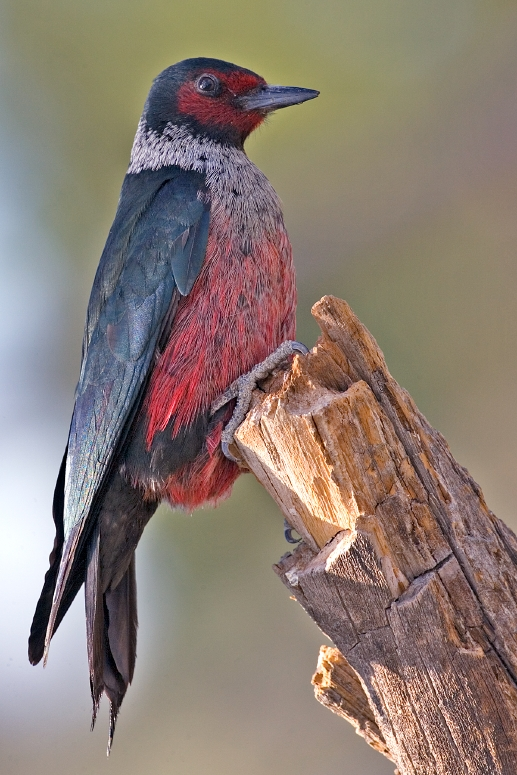
Lewis's Woodpecker

=== Lewis's woodpecker ===
In 2010, COSWIC updated the Lewis's woodpecker from a species of particular concern to an endangered species. Canada's Species at Risk Act (SARA) implemented the update in 2012. The population of the Lewis's woodpecker is fewer than 1,000 and has been documented as a declining population during the 21st century. The identified threats of this species' population decline have been narrowed to habitat loss due to urbanization, the logging industry and wildfires. The Lewis's woodpecker require habitats with large diameter trees that are scattered around and separated by grasslands that plants occupy that insects are abundant in. They tend to congregate in areas with their required habitat. The Vaseux-Bighorn National Wildlife Area provides the habitat for the Lewis's woodpecker, and its protection makes it a suitable habitat for the birds to rehabilitate.

=== Pallid bat ===
In 2000, the pallid bat was designated as threatened and confirmed in 2010. The species originates from Mexico and only inhabits the Okanagan Valley in Canada. Population estimates are lacking; however, the density is expected to be very low, especially in Canada. Many processes, including fruit agriculture, threaten the bats. Pallid bats feed on insects and can be poisoned by consuming prey that carries traces of farming pesticides. The pallid pat is also threatened by habitat loss through expanding urbanization.

=== Behr's hairstreak ===
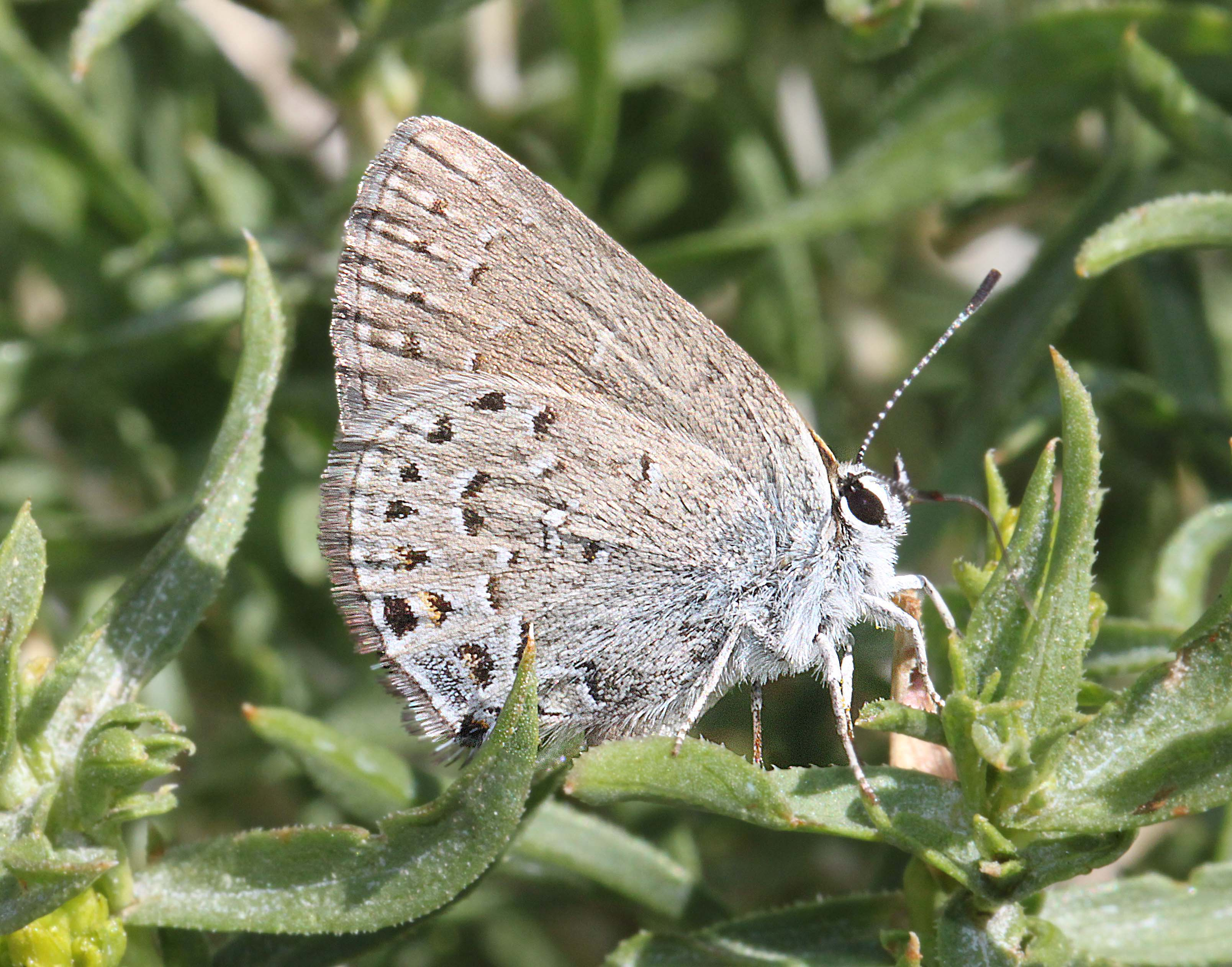
Behr's hairstreak butterfly

The Behr's hairstreak is a butterfly species added to the endangered list by SARA in 2017 and COSEWIC in 2012. The butterfly exclusively inhabits the region of the Vaseux-Bighorn NWA.[1] The Behr's hairstreak lives among the brushes and occupies a small area individually throughout their lives. They are not spread out in this region of British Columbia, further amplifying risk. A stochastic event (e.g., wildfires) could critically affect the population. Another major threat of habitat loss is viticulture (i.e., the agriculture of wine). Viticulture tends to be placed in drier climates and is popular in the Okanagan Valley. No viticulture occurs directly in the Vaseux-Bighorn National Park; however, it threatens the butterfly's habitat and long-term viability.

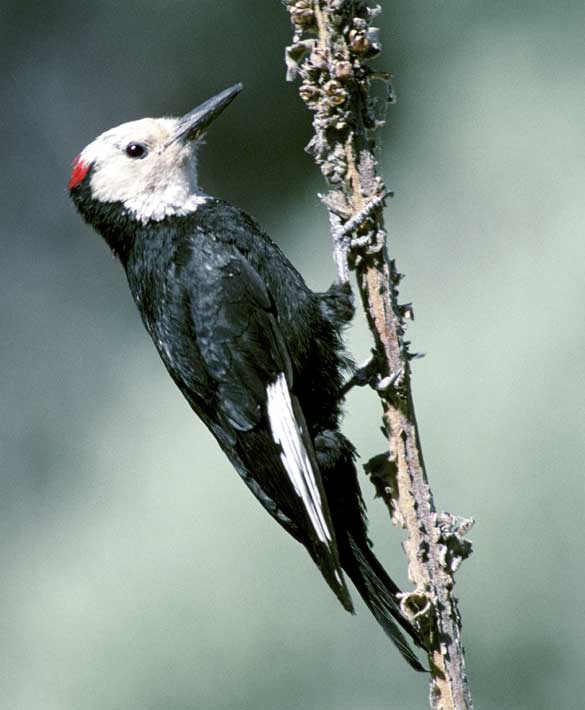
White-headed Woodpecker

Currently, four species are listed under the Species at Risk Act (SARA) in Vaseux-Bighorn National Wildlife Area. These include the white-headed woodpecker, the Lewis's woodpecker, the pallid bat and the bears hairstreak. The park also contains one particular concern species: The peregrine falcon.

=== White-headed woodpecker ===
The white-headed woodpecker has never been abundant in British Columbia, totalling fewer than 100 birds in Canada. They were put on the threatened species list in 1992 and have remained there ever since. The white-headed woodpecker's low population threatens their viability, but the most significant hazard is the lack of suitable habitat. White-headed woodpeckers prefer to nest in an abundance of pine trees. The trees are lacking in Vaseux-Bighorn NWA because the logging industry has depleted old-growth forests. Over the last century, there has not been an abundance of change in their population, as they naturally do not have a large population and tend to inhabit different areas from year to year.

== Other species ==
The Vaseux-Bighorn National Wildlife Area hosts the Vaseux Lake Migratory Bird Sanctuary and the Vaseux Lake Important Bird Area. Other endangered species located in the area include the spotted bat, American badger, Nuttall's cottontail, and the western harvest mouse. A species in the area of special concern is the long-billed curlew. This area also includes many invasive species such as the purple loosestrife, Eurasian milfoil, sulphur cinquefoil, reed canary grass, cheatgrass, smooth brome, bull thistle, diffuse knapweed, Hound's Tongue, and St. John's wort. It also includes some rare plant communities including the antelope brush, needle-and-thread grass, water birch, red-osier dogwood, bluebunch wheatgrass, arrow-leaved balsamroot, and ponderosa pine bluebunch wheatgrass. Some reptile and amphibian species at risk in the area include the desert nightsnake, great basin gopher snake, Great Basin spadefoot, rubber boa, tiger salamander, western painted turtle, western rattlesnake, western skink, western toad, western yellow-bellied racer. There are no known endemic species in the Vaseux-Bighorn National wildlife area.

== Recreation ==
The Vaseux-Bighorn national wildlife area contains several hiking trails and the boardwalks feature wildlife viewing areas. Nonetheless, much of the area is restricted wildlife habitat that requires a permit to access. Protecting these areas from human use maintains long-term viability for the wildlife in the park because their habitat remains unbothered by human interaction. The Vaseux-Bighorn wildlife area also features a wildlife viewing tower that is popular for bird watching. Most of the site, though, is a sanctuary for wildlife to live unscathed.

== See also ==
- List of National Wildlife Areas in Canada
- Vaseux Lake
- Vaseux Lake Provincial Park
- Vaseux Protected Area
