= Blue Mountain Vineyard =

Winery in British Columbia, Canada

Blue Mountain Vineyard & Cellars
- Location: Okanagan Falls, British Columbia, Canada
- Coordinates: 49.3131°N 119.5311°W
- Appellation: Okanagan Valley
- Founded: 1971
- First vintage: 1991
- Key people: Ian & Jane Mavety (Proprietors), Matt Mavety (General Manager)
- Parent company: Privately Owned
- Cases/yr: 12,000
- Known for: Pinot noir & Pinot gris
- Varietals: Pinot noir, Pinot gris, Pinot blanc, Chardonnay, Gamay noir, Sparkling wine, Sparkling Rosé
- Distribution: regional, restaurants & wine club only
- Tasting: by appointment only
- Website: www.bluemountainwinery.com

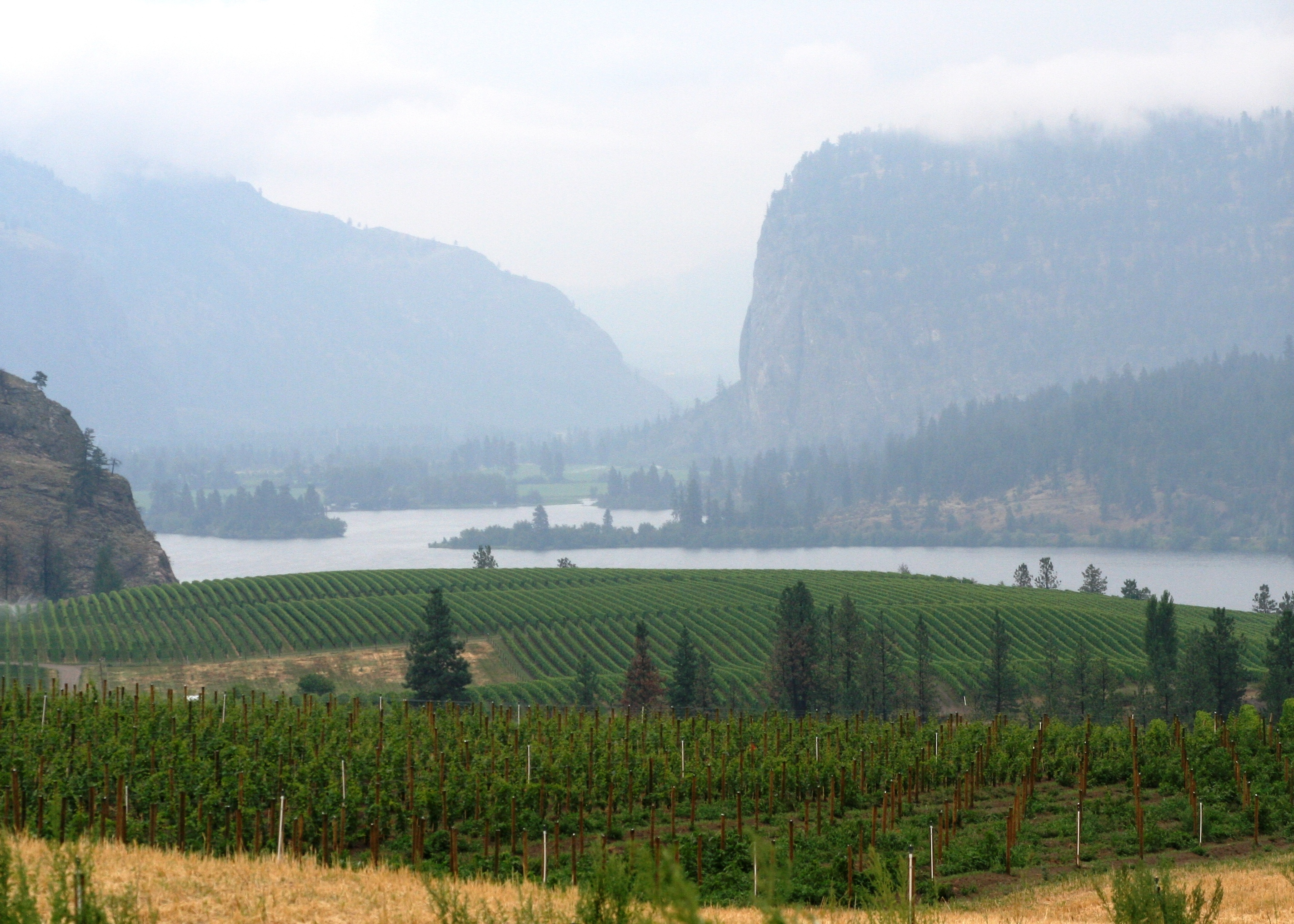
The vineyards at Blue Mountain

Blue Mountain Vineyard, located on the shore of Vaseux Lake in Okanagan Falls, British Columbia is a Canadian Winery. Situated near the bottom of British Columbia's Okanagan Valley, Blue Mountain produces over 12,000 cases of wine per year. Blue Mountain's tasting room is open by appointment only.

== History ==
In 1971, Proprietor Ian completed his Agriculture degree and purchased his first parcel of land which now constitutes Blue Mountain's vineyard. Described as "the most radically laid-out vineyard in the Okanagan Valley", Blue Mountain's view, overlooking Vaseux Lake, is isolated from the main valley corridor. The local terroir provides Blue Mountain with varying "micro-climates" conducive for grape-growing of differing varietals. It was the unique qualities of the terroir that led Mavetys to establish the vineyard near Okanagan Falls.

For over 2 decades, the Mavetys supplied their grapes by contract to other commercial wineries. In 1991, the Mavetys had sufficiently refined their skills at viticulture and wine making so as to release their first wines under the Blue Mountain label. Shortly after the first release, The Mavetys' son Matt joined the family business. Matt earned a degree in agricultural economics from the University of British Columbia (his father's alma mater) and a post-graduate degree in viticulture studies at Lincoln University in New Zealand. Matt's sister Christie runs the winery's marketing operations.

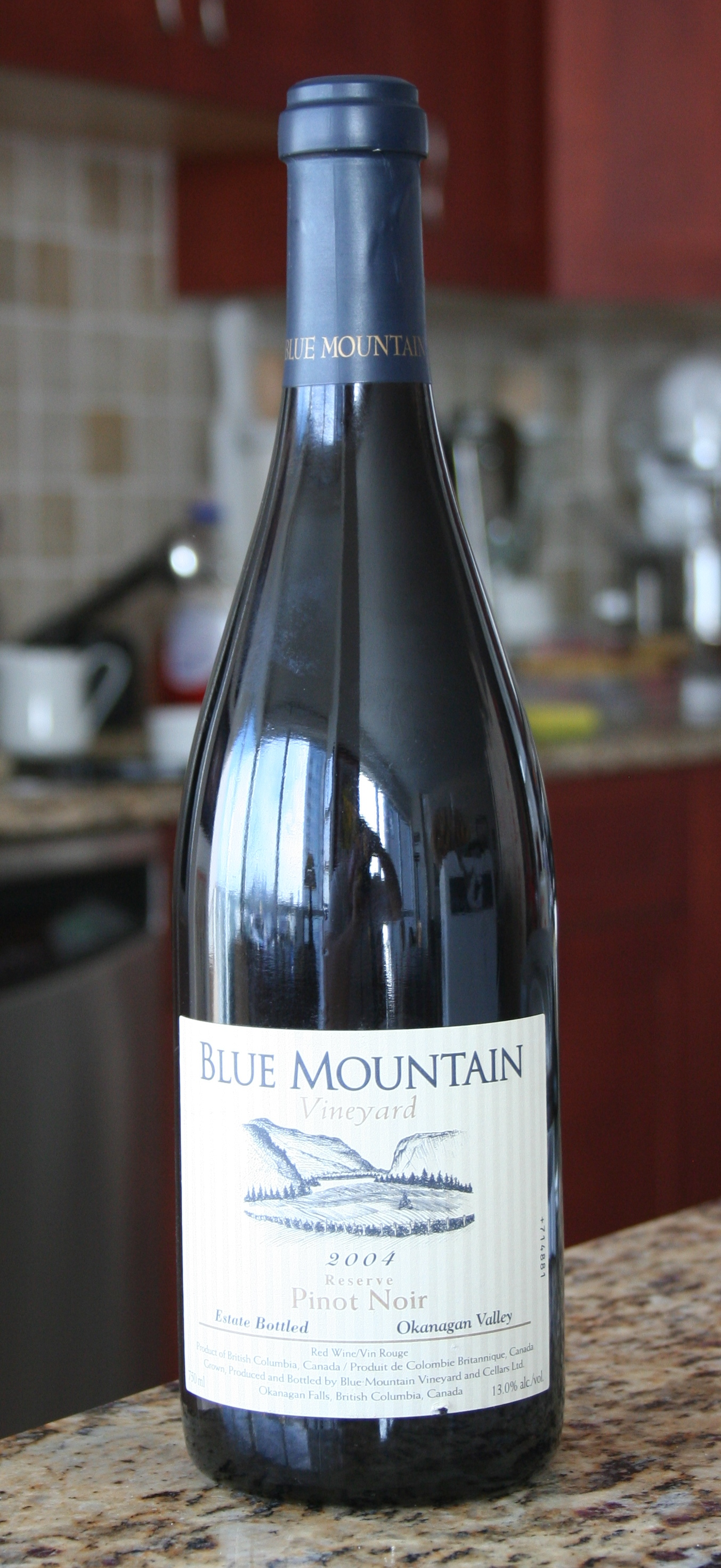
Reserve Pinot noir 2004
