= Bonaparte Provincial Park =

Canadian provincial park

- IUCN category II (national park)
- Location within British Columbia
- Interactive map of Bonaparte Provincial Park
- Location: Kamloops Division Yale Land District, British Columbia, Canada
- Nearest city: 70 Mile House, BC
- Coordinates: 51°09′19″N 120°29′20″W
- Area: 11,833 ha (29,240 acres)
- Established: April 30, 1996
- Governing body: BC Parks

Bonaparte Provincial Park is an 11,811 hectare provincial park in British Columbia, Canada. It is located within the Bonaparte Plateau.

== History ==
The park was established April 30, 1996, under the Kamloops Land and Resource Management Plan (LRMP) through the Environment and Land Use Act.

First Nations use of the land is not well known. More recently it had been used as a ranchland by settlers and for fly-in tourism. Prior to the development of the park a moratoria had been placed on timber harvesting in the area in 1974.

== Geology ==
The park has many small hills formed by lava flow. This has led to the over 50 small interconnected lakes located within the park.

Points of Interest
Lakes	Lava Cones (elevation)
Bare Lake – contains a wilderness lodge; Dagger Lake; Grant Lake group; Hiahkwah-Shelley Lake chain; Hoopatakwa Lake; Moose-Dumbell Lake chain; Stadia Lake; Willowgrouse Lake	Skoatl Point – 1640m; Bare Hill - 1574m

== Geography ==
The park is located 55 kilometers northwest of Kamloops. Motorized vehicle access is most easily obtained via Jamieson Creek Road.

=== Park boundaries ===
The Southern boundary of the park is formed by the Hiakwah-Shelley Lake chain. To the east are tree farm license lands. To the north and west are Provincial Forest lands.

== Ecology ==
The park contains sub-alpine forest, small lakes and wetlands at high elevation. There are no known threatened species within the park. Cattle grazing is permitted within the park.

Plants and Animals of Note
Plants	Birds	Mammals	Fish
Subalpine fir Montane spruce Engelmann spruce Lodgepole pine Fairyslipper orchids	Sandhill crane Fisher Great horned owl Osprey Ruffed grouse Spruce grouse Barrows goldeneye	Marten Moose Timber wolf Mule deer Beaver Black bear Cougar	Rainbow trout (wild and stocked) Pike minnow

== Recreation ==
There is no access within the park to motorized vehicles though snowmobile use is permitted in the southern portion. The park can also be accessed by floatplane and there are fly in fishing lodges. Horses are also permitted. All camping and hiking in the park is in the backcountry without any regular service or parks patrol. Seasonal hunting is permitted.

== See also ==
- Lac du Bois Grasslands Protected Area
