= Blasted Church Vineyards =

Winery in British Columbia, Canada

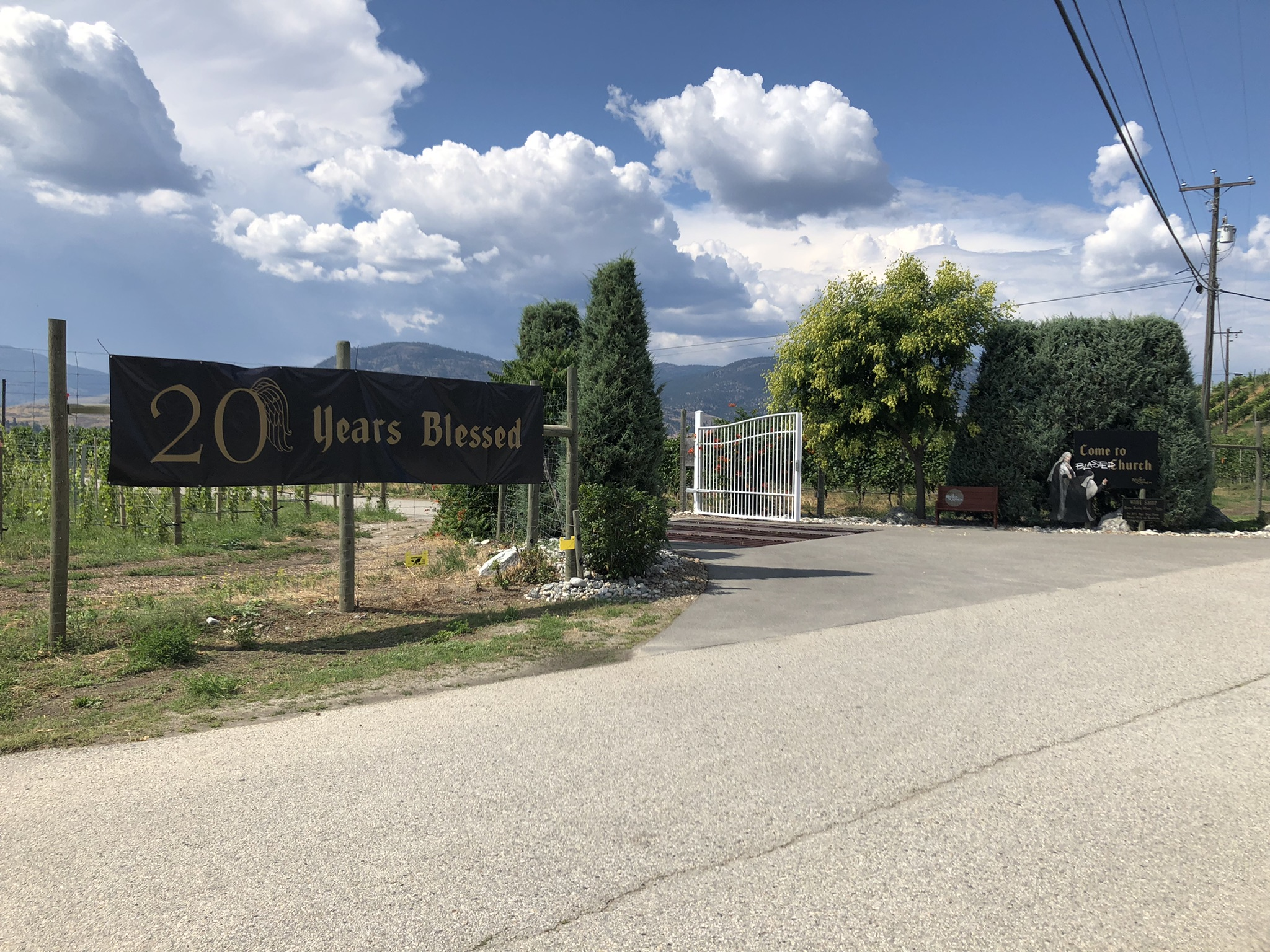
- Front gate of Blasted Church Vineyards, 2022
- Location: Okanagan Falls, British Columbia, Canada
- Coordinates: 49.3877°N 119.5590°W
- Appellation: Okanagan Valley
- Founded: 2002
- First vintage: 2002
- Key people: Sean Morrison (proprietor and managing partner), Evan Saunders (winemaker), John Bayley (vineyard manager), Tanya Martin, (general manager), Evelyn & Chris Campbell (founding owners)
- Parent company: Privately owned
- Cases/yr: 25,000
- Known for: Merlot & Pinot Gris
- Varietals: Cabernet sauvignon, Merlot, Pinot Noir, Syrah, Blaufränkisch, Chardonnay, Sauvignon blanc, Pinot gris
- Distribution: government liquor stores, private liquor stores, restaurants, direct to consumer online & wine club
- Tasting: Open to the public
- Website: blastedchurch.com

Blasted Church Vineyards, located in Okanagan Falls, is a Canadian winery. It is situated in British Columbia's Okanagan Valley and within the VQA sub-region Skaha Bench. Blasted Church produces over 25,000 cases of wine per year.

== History ==
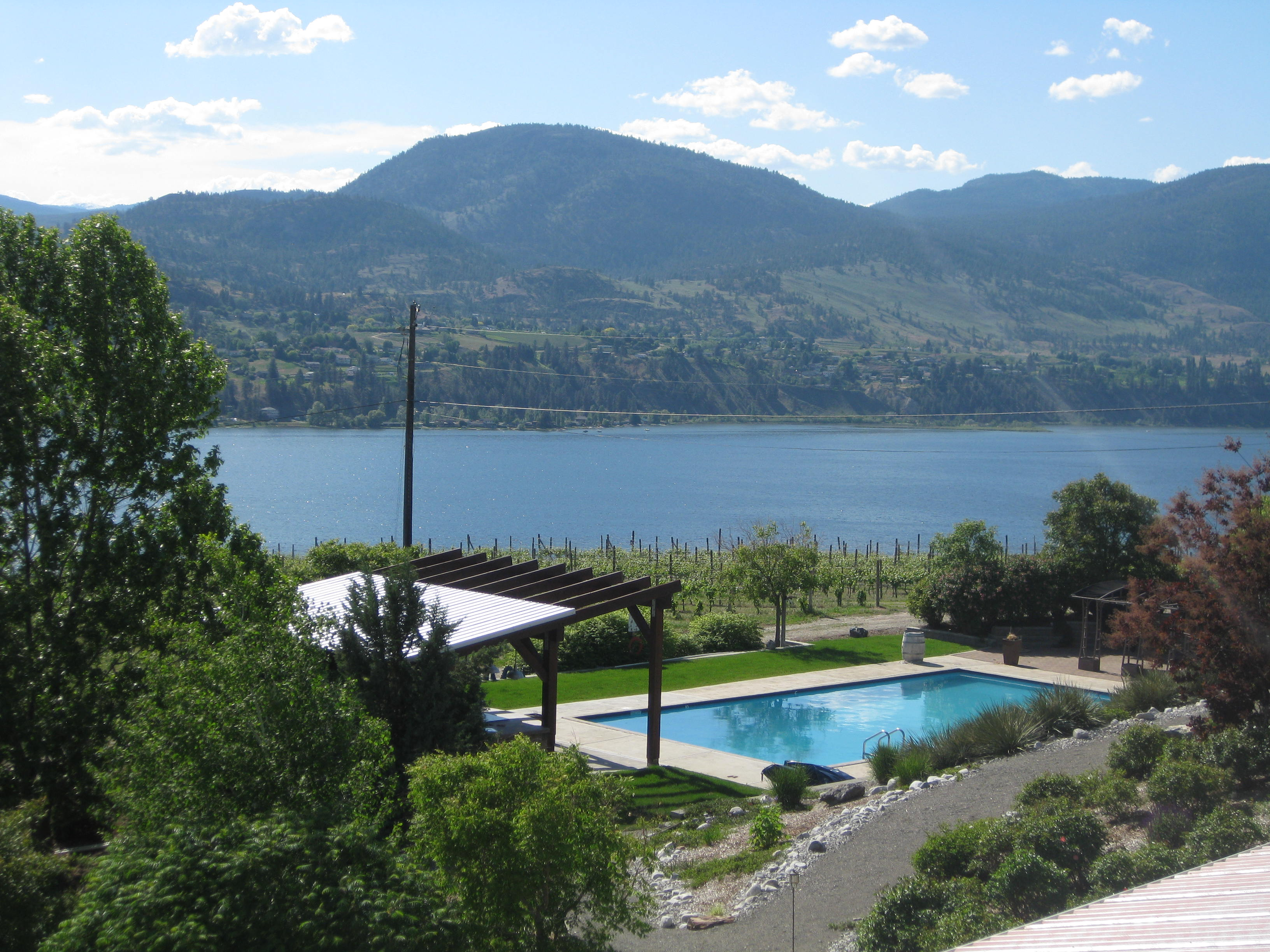
Blasted Church view of the lake.

In 2002, Proprietors Evelyn & Chris Campbell bought the 2 year old 17-hectare Prpich Hills Winery on the road between Okanagan Falls and Penticton. The winery is named after a local story. In 1929, a church was dismantled in Fairview, via a controlled dynamite explosion which loosened the nails, and reassembled in the center of Okanagan Falls where it now stands. In 2022, an original church pew was acquired from the actual "blasted church" (now Okanagan Falls United Church) and is now located outside of the wine shop to be a resting place to sit and experience the unique history.

The transformation of Prpich Hills to Blasted Church started with creative label redesigns by Vancouver designer Bernie Hadley-Beauregard. In 2018, Blasted Church introduced the 3rd generation of labels inspired by Renaissance era masterworks where figures from classical paintings are superimposed on famous Vancouver-area places and landmarks.

In 2004, Blasted Church became the first Okanagan vintners to produce all of their wines with screw-top bottle caps. All of the still wines in the portfolio are sealed with screwcaps while the sparkling wines are sealed with crown caps.

== Winemaker ==
Blasted Church's first winemaker, Frank Supernak, died unexpectedly during the first harvest, prompting many other local vintners to assist the Campbell family in completing the production of finished wine. The images of these winemakers adorned bottle labels at Blasted Church in their first generation of label designs.

The current winemaker is Evan Saunders, who joined the winery in 2014 as a cellar hand and became winemaker in 2017.
