= 2003 Okanagan Mountain Park fire =

Wildfire in British Columbia, Canada

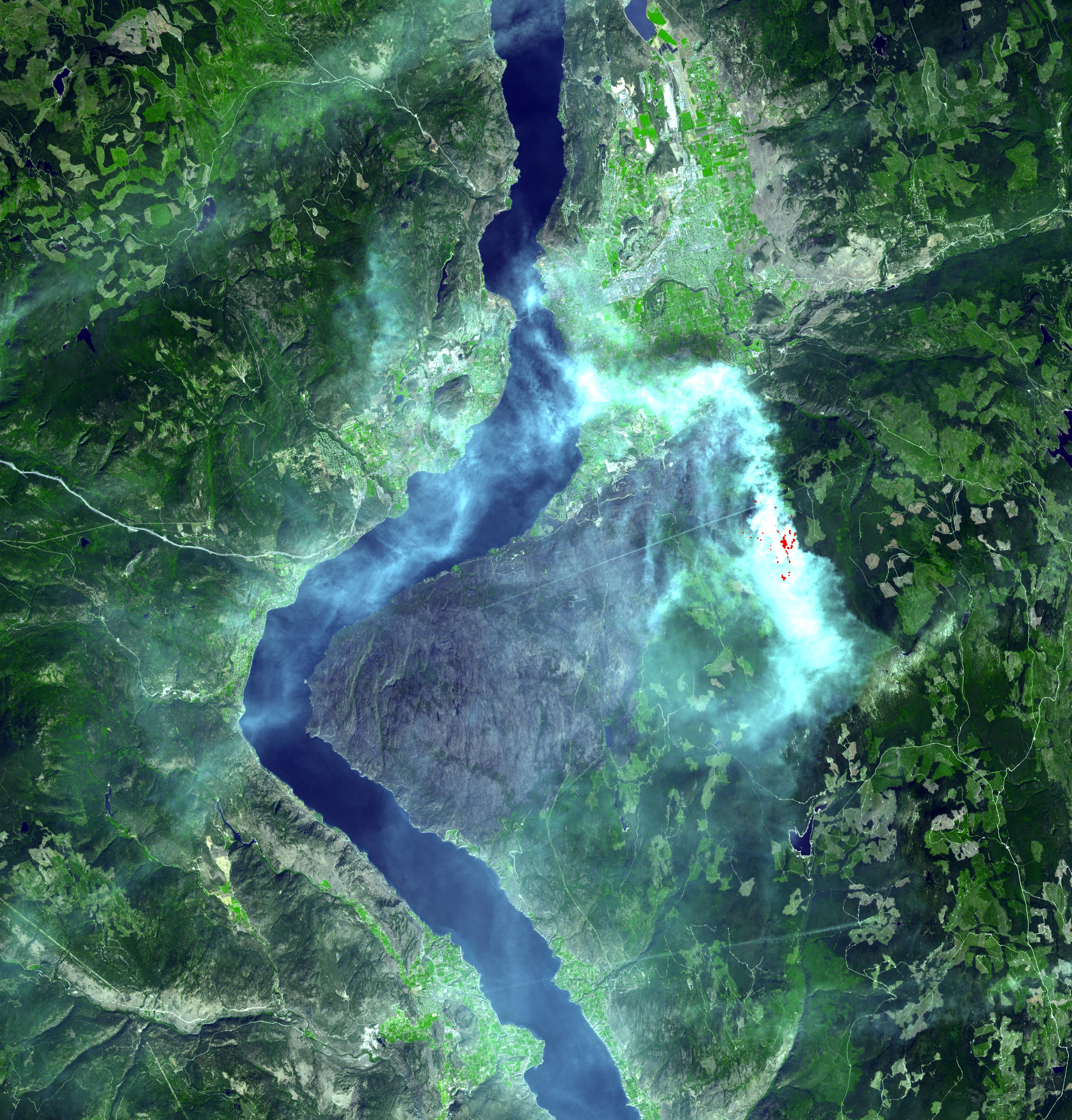
- Date: August 16, 2003
- Location: Okanagan Mountain Park

Statistics
- Burned area: 25,912 hectares (64,030 acres)
- Land use: Parkland, rural

Impacts
- Injuries: water bomber crash
- Structures destroyed: 239

Ignition
- Cause: lightning strike

Map
- Perimeter of 2003 Okanagan Mountain Park fire (map data)

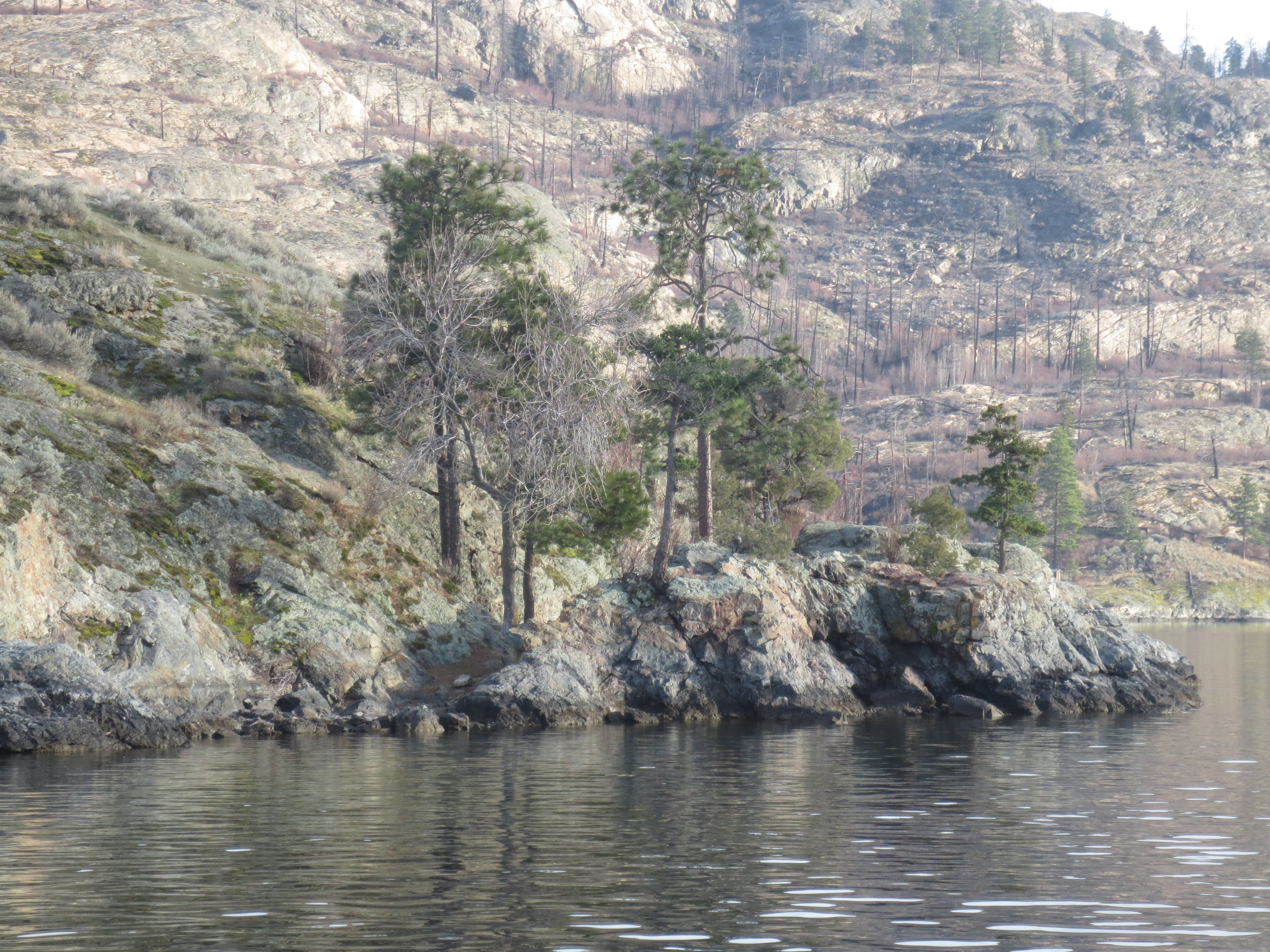
Fire damage visible in background of Rattlesnake Island

On August 16, 2003, at about 4 a.m. local time, a wildfire started via lightning strike near Rattlesnake Island in Okanagan Mountain Provincial Park, British Columbia, Canada. The wildfire was fuelled by a constant wind and the driest summer on record up to that time. Within a few days it grew into a firestorm.

The fire spread northward and eastward, initially threatening a small number of lakeshore homes, but quickly became an interface zone fire and forced the evacuation of 27,000 residents, consuming 239 homes. The final size of the firestorm was over 250 square kilometres (25,912 ha or 64,030 acres). Most of the trees in Okanagan Mountain Park burned, and the park was closed.

60 fire departments, 1,400 armed forces troops and 1,000 forest fire fighters took part in controlling the fire, but were largely incapable of stopping the disaster.

There were also a number of aircraft used in an attempt to extinguish the fire, including three private Canadair CL-215s, four Government of Alberta owned Canadair CL-215s, four private Lockheed L188 Electra air tankers and at least one Martin Mars air tanker. Amateur radio operators assisted during the emergency.

That total cost was estimated at $33.8 million.

== See also ==
- McDougall Creek Fire: A wildfire started on August 15, 2023 in the Okanagan region of British Columbia
- Operation Peregrine
- List of fires in Canada
- List of disasters in Canada
