= Vaseux Lake =

Lake in the Okanagan Valley of British Columbia, Canada

- IUCN category III (natural monument or feature)
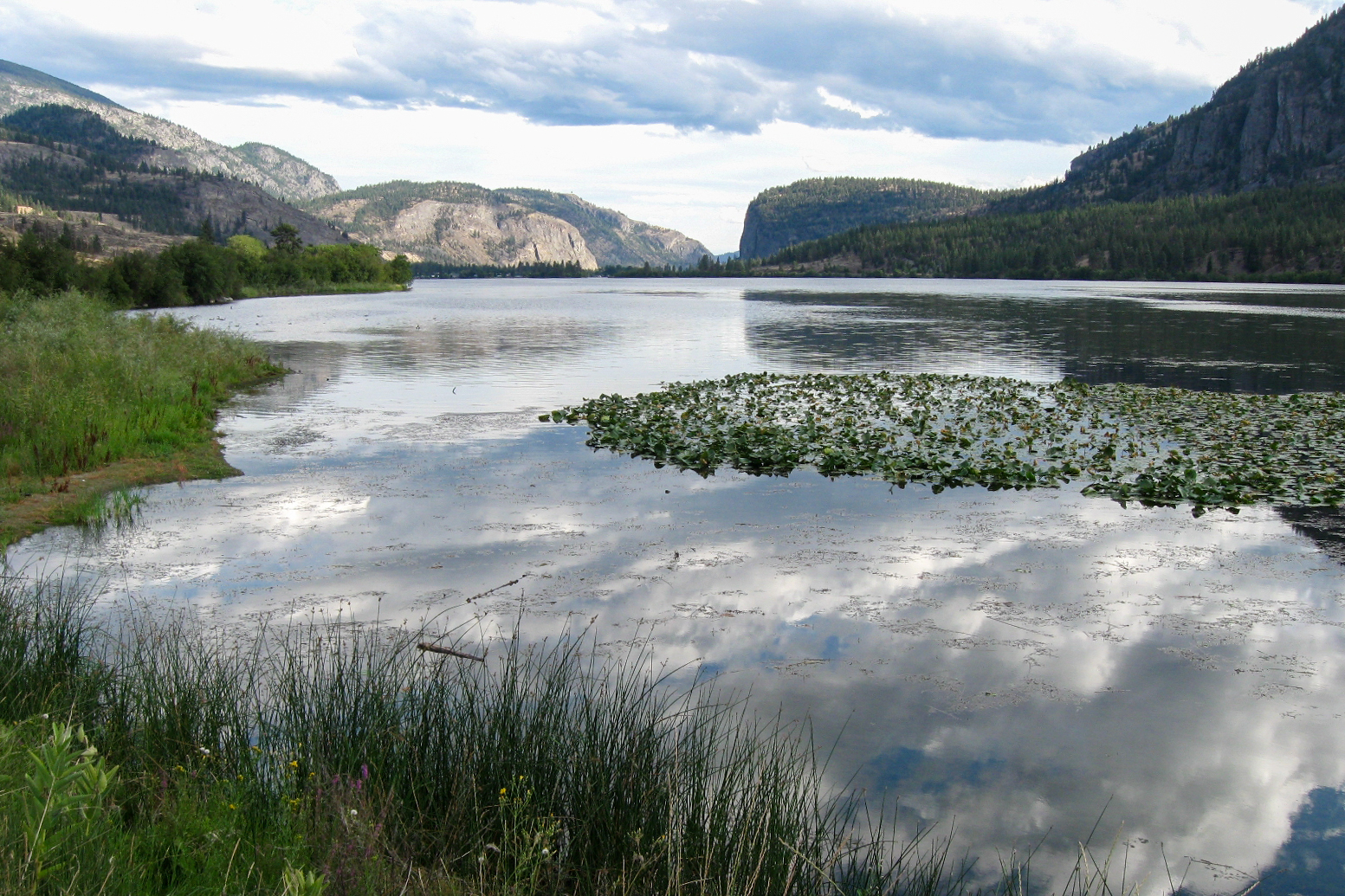
- Looking across Vaseux Lake towards McIntyre Bluff
- Interactive map of Vaseux Lake
- Location: Okanagan, British Columbia, Canada
- Coordinates: 49°17′30″N 119°32′00″W
- Length: 3.8 km (2.4 mi)
- Width: 0.8 km (0.50 mi)
- Elevation: 357 m (1,171 ft)
- Designation: Migratory Bird Sanctuary
- Established: 1923
- Governing body: Canadian Wildlife Service

Vaseux Lake is a shallow freshwater lake located along the course of the Okanagan River in the Okanagan Valley of British Columbia, Canada.

== Name origin ==
The name "vaseux" is French, meaning muddy or murky, which is descriptive of the lake's silty water. The lake was likely named by French Canadian fur traders.

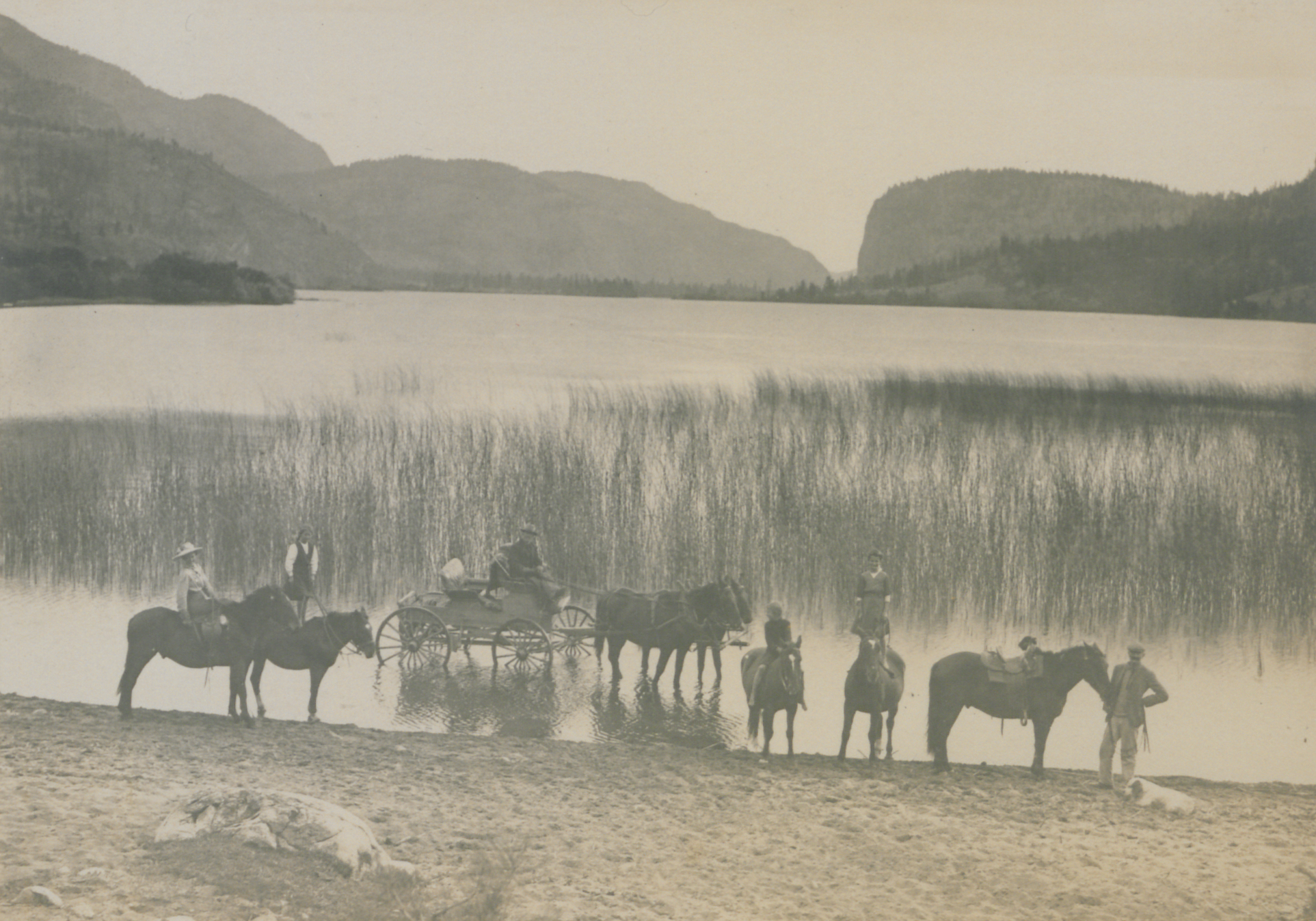
Vaseux Lake, 1909

The lake was misspelled as Vasuix Lake on Joseph Trutch's maps from 1866 and 1871. For many years the name was later spelled Vaseaux Lake; in 1945 the Geographic Board of BC corrected the official name to its present form.

== Geography ==
The town of Okanagan Falls is to the north, and the town of Oliver is to the south. The lake lies to the east of Mount Keogan, while British Columbia Highway 97 runs alongside the east shore of the lake, and has a sharp hairpin turn at the Vaseaux Lake Rock Cut which has been the scene of many accidents and deaths. McIntyre Bluff, Vaseux Creek and the associated alluvial fan are to the south; however, it does not flow into Vaseux Lake. Both the north and south ends of the lake are shallow; there is an oval-shaped depression in the center where the lake reaches its maximum depth. The largest island on the lake is Hatfield Island. The lake stage is controlled by McIntyre Dam.

== Conservation ==
Vaseaux Lake features a variety of wetland and foreshore habitats that support large populations of migratory bird species along the inland portion of the Pacific Flyway. Bird species of note include trumpeter swan, great blue heron, western screech-owl, yellow-breasted chat, and the red-listed Lewis's woodpecker. It is for these reasons that the Canadian Wildlife Service designated the lake and its foreshore a Migratory Bird Sanctuary in 1923.

The semi-arid grasslands and forests surrounding the lake are also of ecological importance, and are protected within several different national and provincial protected areas. In 1956, the provincial government established Vaseux Lake Provincial Park at the northeastern end of the lake to providing space for recreation while also ensuring the ecological integrity of the lake's foreshore in this area is preserved.

In 1979, the Canadian Wildlife Service established Vaseux-Bighorn National Wildlife Area to protect winter rangeland for California Bighorn Sheep. The provincial government added on to this nature preserve by establishing Vaseux Protected Area in 2001.

== Fishing ==
Motorized boats are not permitted on the lake, requiring anglers and aquatic enthusiasts to resort to paddle or pedal power.

It has an abundant fish population, made up of carp, smallmouth bass, largemouth bass, perch, and rainbow trout.

== See also ==
- List of lakes of British Columbia
- Skaha Lake
- Okanagan Basin Water Board
