= Lac du Bois Grasslands Protected Area =

Provincial park in Thompson-Nicola Regional District, British Columbia

- IUCN category II (national park)
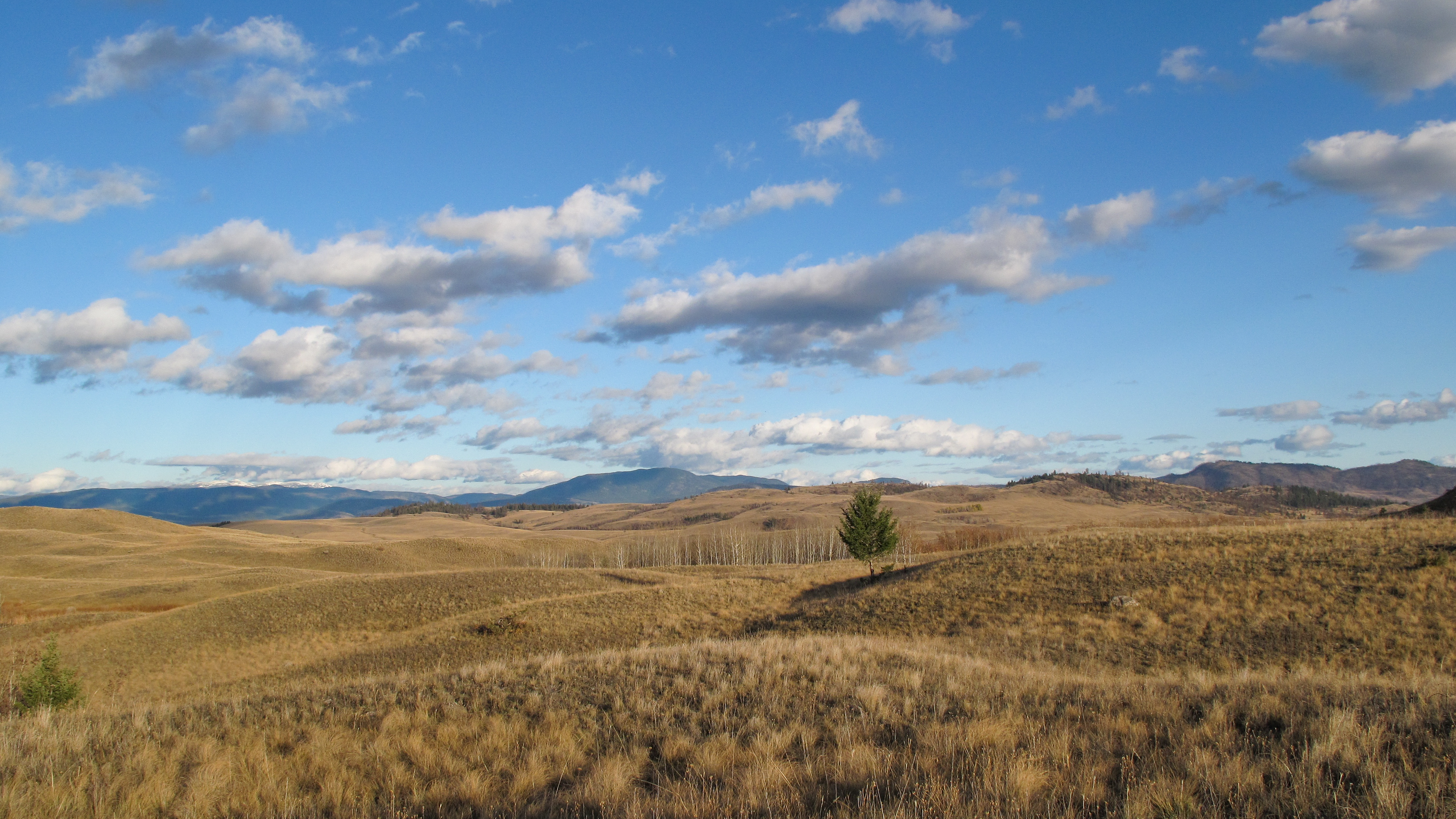
- Looking east across Lac du Bois Grasslands

- Location within British Columbia Location within Canada
- Location: Thompson-Nicola RD, British Columbia
- Nearest city: Kamloops
- Coordinates: 50°46′15″N 120°27′40″W
- Area: 15,712 ha (60.66 sq mi)
- Established: 30 April 1996
- Governing body: BC Parks
- Website: bcparks.ca/lac-du-bois-grasslands-protected-area/

Lac du Bois Grasslands Protected Area is a protected area located north of Kamloops in British Columbia, Canada. The protected area was established by BC Parks on 30 April 1996 to protect a unique mixed forest–grassland ecosystem overlooking the North and South forks of the Thompson River.

== Geography ==
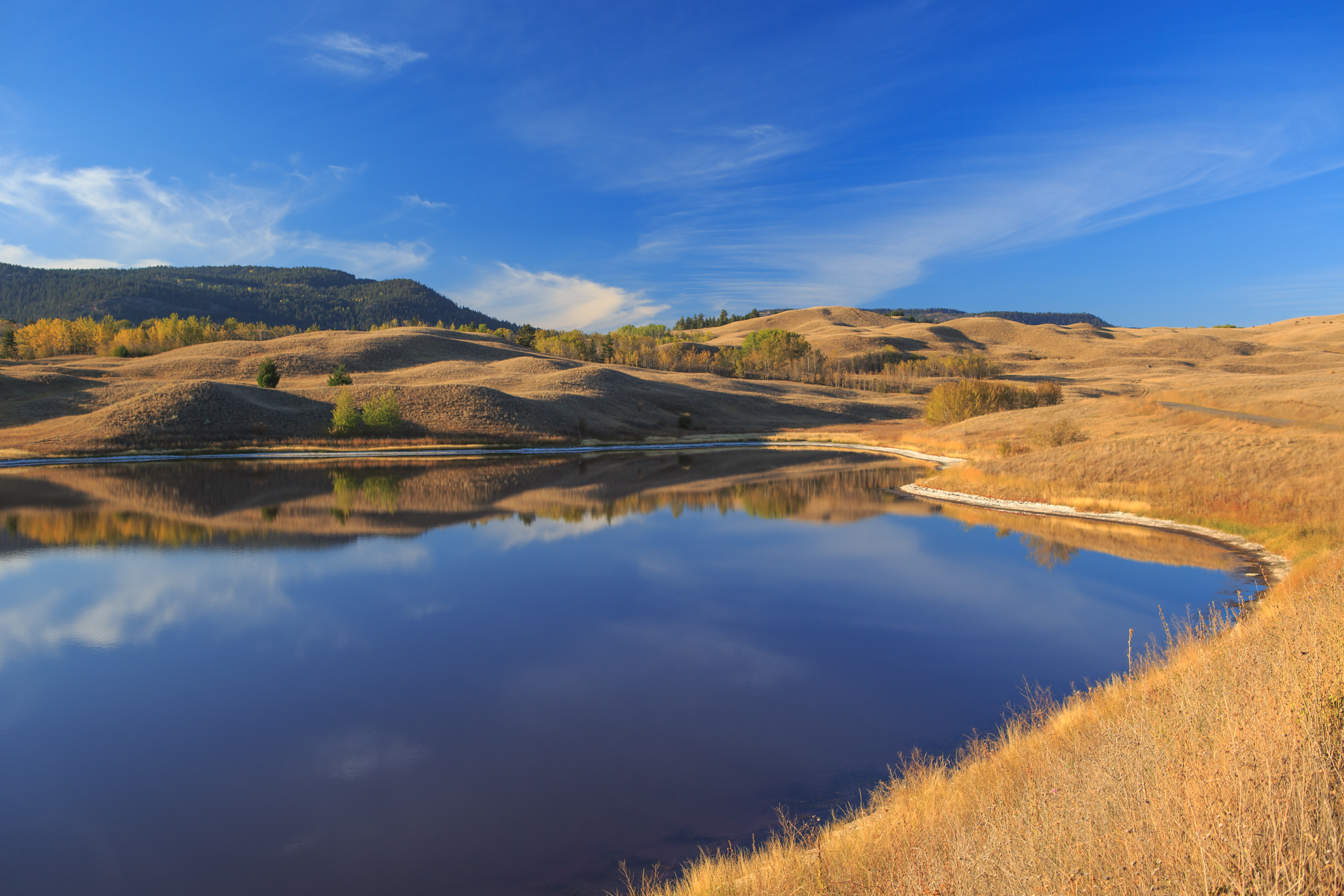
One of many small lakes found throughout Lac du Bois Grasslands

Lac du Bois Grasslands is set within the southern foothills of the Bonaparte Plateau, which itself is part of the much larger Interior Plateau that bisects the province. These foothills vary in topography from gently rolling hills interspersed with small lakes and ponds to the prominent rocky cliffs overlooking Kamloops Lake. The soils of this region are predominantly alkaline.

== Ecology ==
=== Flora ===
The protected area is dominated by fields of junegrass and bluebunch wheatgrass broken-up by small groves of Ponderosa pine and Douglas fir. These grasslands gradually transition into a forest-dominated ecosystem at higher elevations.

The southern benches, which are located in the southeastern corner of the protected area, are dominated by big sagebrush and bluebunch wheatgrass.

=== Fauna ===
Resident mammal species of note include black bear, bighorn sheep, moose, mule deer, and white-tailed deer. Resident bird species of note include flammulated owl, harrier, sharp-tailed grouse, long-billed curlew, and various waterfowl species. The grasslands also provide habitat for western rattlesnake near the northern extent of their range.

== Activities ==
Lac du Bois Grasslands is open year-round and can be accessed via Lac du Bois Road or Tranquille-Criss Creek Forest Service Road. Off-road vehicles are prohibited within the protected area. Popular activities include hiking, mountain biking, wildlife viewing, fishing, and hunting during open season.

== See also ==
- Bonaparte Provincial Park
