= Okanagan Mountain Provincial Park =

Provincial park in British Columbia, Canada

- IUCN category II (national park)
- Half Way Bay on Lake Okanagan during Golden Hour in Winter
- Location within British Columbia
- Interactive map of Okanagan Mountain Provincial Park
- Location: British Columbia, Canada
- Nearest city: Kelowna
- Coordinates: 49°43′42″N 119°38′21″W
- Area: 110.38 km^{2} (42.62 sq mi)
- Established: 1973
- Governing body: BC Parks

Okanagan Mountain Provincial Park is a provincial park within the Okanagan-Similkameen Regional District of British Columbia, Canada, focused on the mountain of the same name and located on the east side of Okanagan Lake, opposite Peachland and immediately south of the City of Kelowna. The park is one of the largest in the area, covering 110.38 square kilometres (42.62 sq mi). Most of the park is only accessible by foot, horseback, bicycle, or boat as motor vehicle access is restricted to BC Parks staff and technicians servicing the three telecommunications towers in the park.

The park comprises several trails, campsites (including six marine camp areas), lakes, and large areas of wilderness. Popular activities include hiking, camping, boating, mountain biking, and hunting (which is permitted).

Between 1975 and 1993, around 84.5 hectares (209 acres) of land now incorporated into Okanagan Mountain Provincial Park was donated by Dr. David Carruthers Murdoch through the Nature Trust of British Columbia.

== Wildlife ==
The rugged rocky terrain is habitat for mountain goats, white-tailed deer, moose, elk, lynx, and marten. Coyote are also found in the park. Small but very important species are the blue listed western harvest mouse, Nuttall's cottontail (the furthest northerly occurrence) and spotted bat.

The northern alligator lizard and western skink can be found under rocks or bark in open wooded areas while the yellow-bellied racer prefers grasslands and open fields. Other reptile species found in the park include western painted turtle, rubber boa, gopher snake, western blue racer and western rattlesnake.

The park protects habitat for bird species including the western grebe and white-headed woodpecker.

== Wildfire ==
In 2003, a wildfire started in the park near Rattlesnake Island and spread quickly, eventually burning most of the park. The burned trees and other fire-related hazards posed an extreme danger and the park was closed. In 2005, the park was reopened after much cleanup work, though many burned trees still are a significant danger.

== Gallery ==
Early Morning Runoff at Okanagan Mountain Provincial Park

Forests Recover from 2007 Fire on a Spring Morning on Okanagan Mountain

Spring Morning over a Frog Pond at the base of a face of Okanagan Mountain

Dying Light on Okanagan Mountain

Mule deer foraging on a late winter morning at Okanagan Mountain Provincial Park

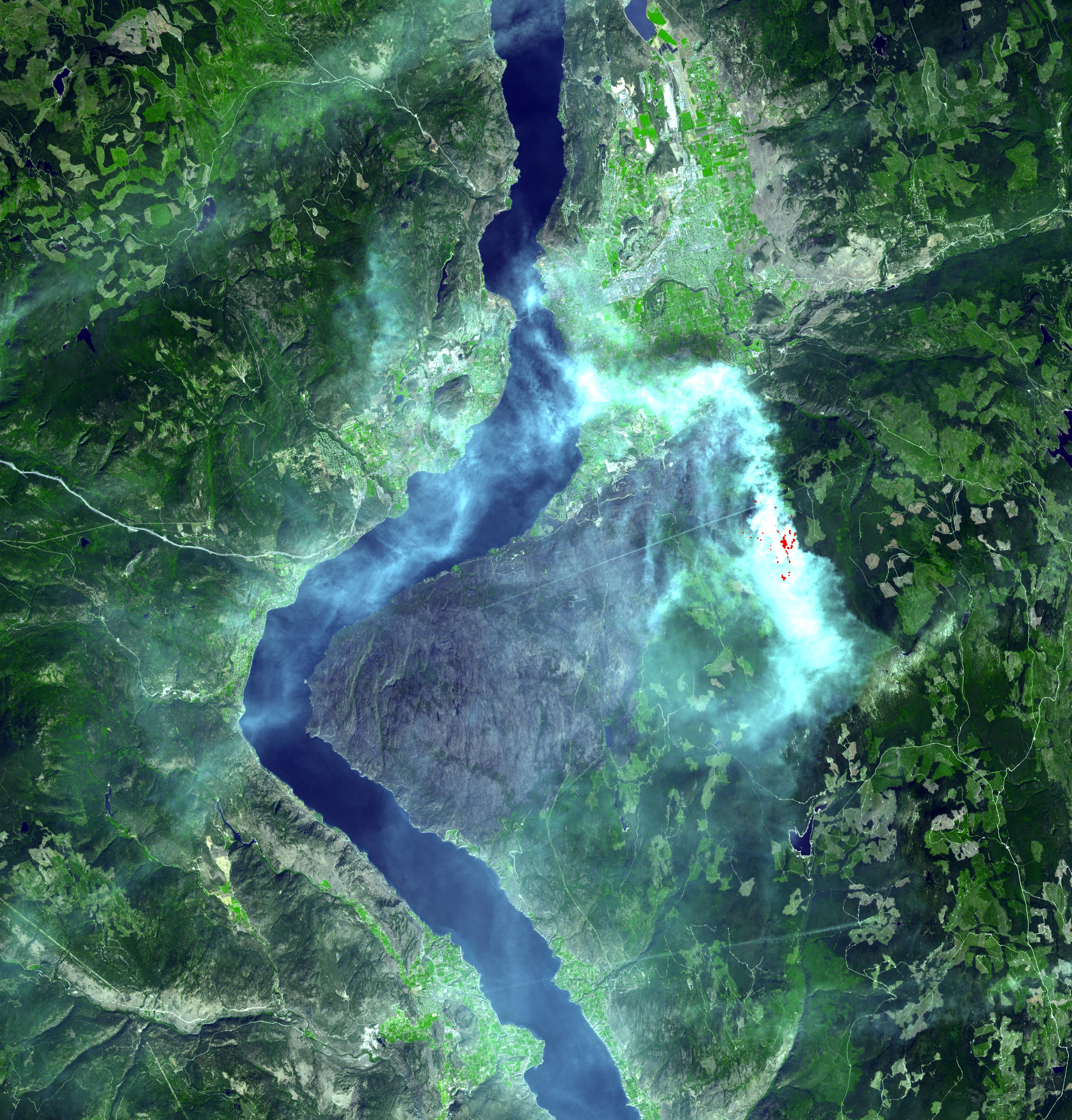
2003 Okanagan Mountain Park Fire
