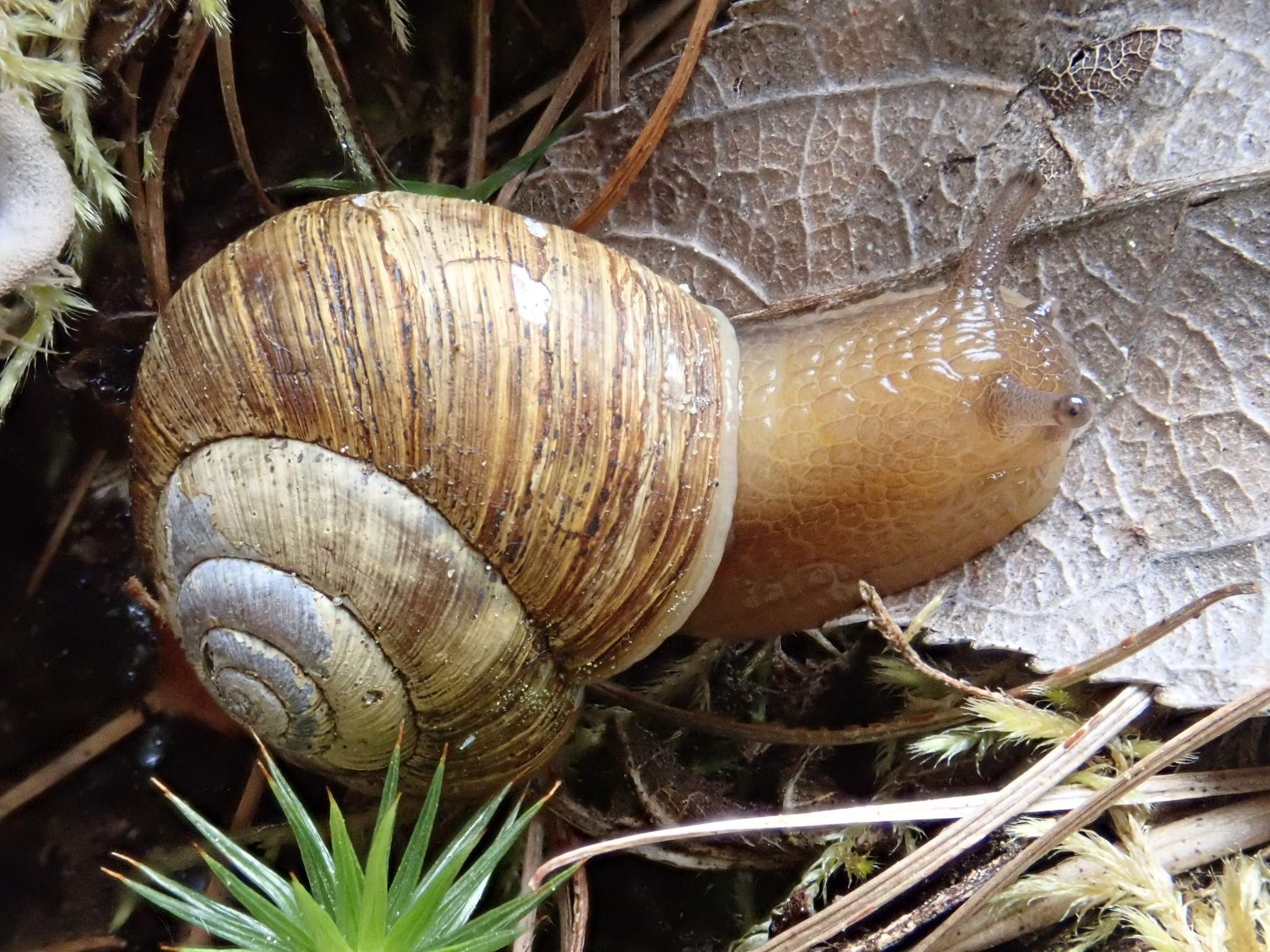

Conservation status
- Secure (NatureServe)

Scientific classification
- Kingdom: Animalia
- Phylum: Mollusca
- Class: Gastropoda
- Order: Stylommatophora
- Family: Discidae
- Genus: Anguispira
- Species: A. kochi

Binomial name
- Anguispira kochi (Pfeiffer, 1846)

= Anguispira kochi =

Species of gastropod

Anguispira kochi, the banded tigersnail, is a species of pulmonate terrestrial gastropod belonging to the family Discidae, the disk snails. There are two recognized subspecies: Anguispira kochi kochi or the eastern banded tigersnail, and Anguispira kochi occidentalis, the western banded tigersnail.

== Physical description ==
The banded tigersnail is a fairly large snail, with an adults typically ranging from 2-2.5 cm in size. They possesses a striated, heliciform shell, typically yellow, chestnut, or light brown in color. A defining feature is the light-colored band that runs along the shell's periphery, bordered by a darker band on each side. The head and tentacles are typically gray in color, with a brown or orange foot. However, snail morphology can vary widely between regions and populations, especially if the population is isolated.

== Range ==
The banded tigernsail is found across the United States and Canada. Its range is disjunct, with distinct western and eastern portions. The western banded tigersnail inhabits the western portion of their range, extending from British Columbia to Oregon. The eastern range, populated by the eastern banded tigersnail, extends from Ontario to as far south as Tennessee.

In 2017, the eastern banded tigersnail was declared critically endangered in Ontario, where it is only found on a few islands in Lake Erie. The most robust and well-studied populations exist on Pelee Island and Middle Island after the species' extirpation from Middle Sister Island, East Sister Island, and North Harbour Island. It is also listed as critically endangered, possibly extirpated, in West Virginia and Michigan. It is listed as vulnerable in Tennessee and Kentucky.

In contrast, the western banded tigersnail is listed as secure or not at risk across most of its range.

== Habitat ==
Banded tigersnails are found in mature mesic hardwood or mixed-wood forests, specifically old growth forest, usually along river bluffs or ravines. However, they can also be found in upland woods around limestone cliffs. Studies have shown that, while banded tigersnails will inhabit previously logged second growth forest, they do so at significantly lower rates compared to old growth. They prefer areas with substantial leaf litter that they can hide under when the weather is hot and dry.

== Threats ==
Like many snail species, the biggest threat to the survival of banded tigernsail populations is climate change. Land snails are particularly sensitive to changes in rainfall and temperature. Increased occurrences of spring frost and drought, combined with hotter temperatures, can put snails at higher risk of death. This is especially true of the eastern banded tigersnail, which has specific habitat requirements and low tolerance to temperature changes; western banded tigersnails have higher temperature and drought tolerance, and are less at risk.

Logging is likely to have a negative impact on banded tigersnail survival and propagation. Logging efforts disturb forest floor litter layers, reduce forest moisture levels, and cause habitat fragmentation; these disturbances can all act as barriers to dispersal and reproduction. The western banded tigersnail is more likely than the eastern banded tigersnail to be impacted by logging.
