= Pelee, Ontario =

Island in Canada

Pelee Island
- Township (single-tier)
- Township of Pelee
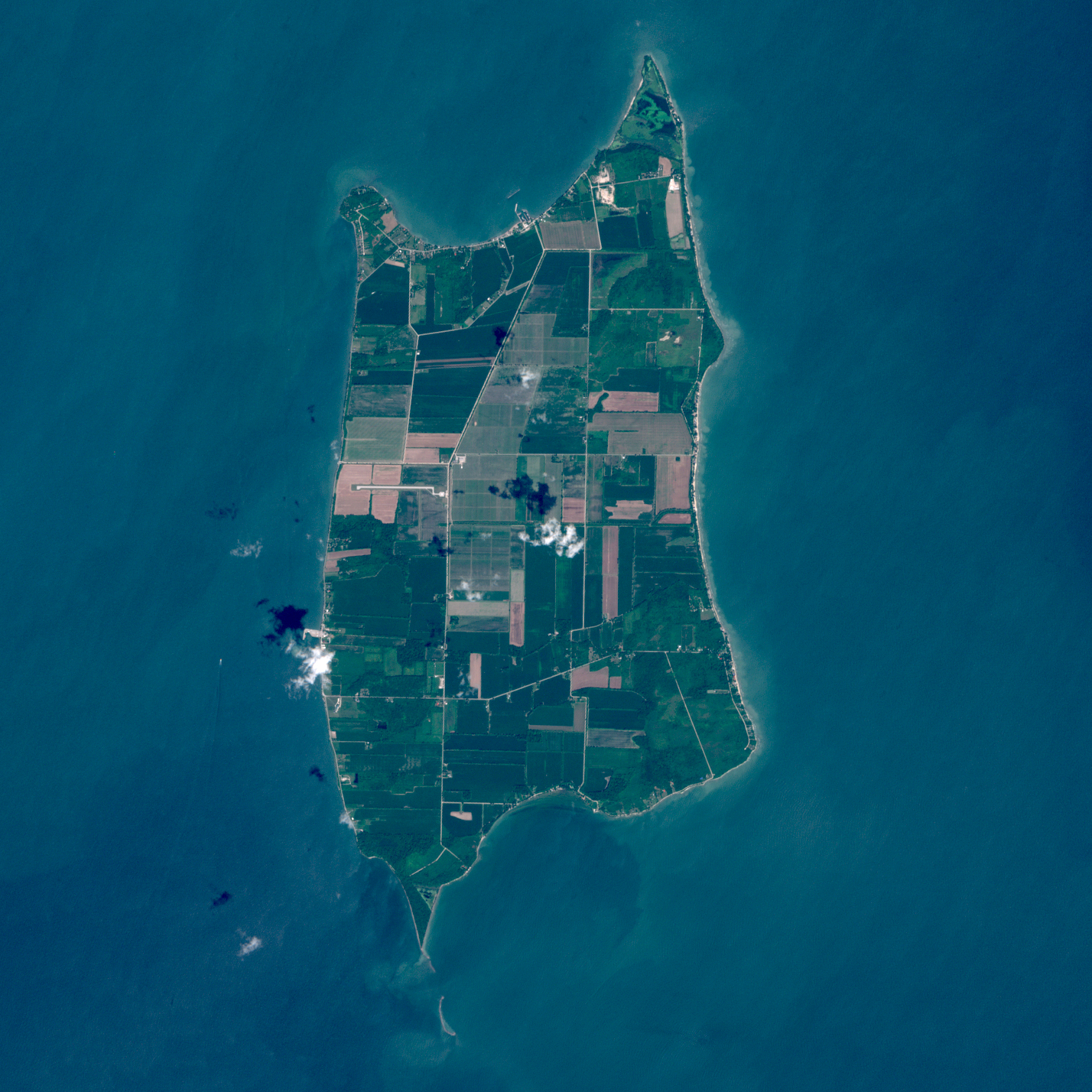
- Satellite photo of Pelee Island, 2022

- Seal

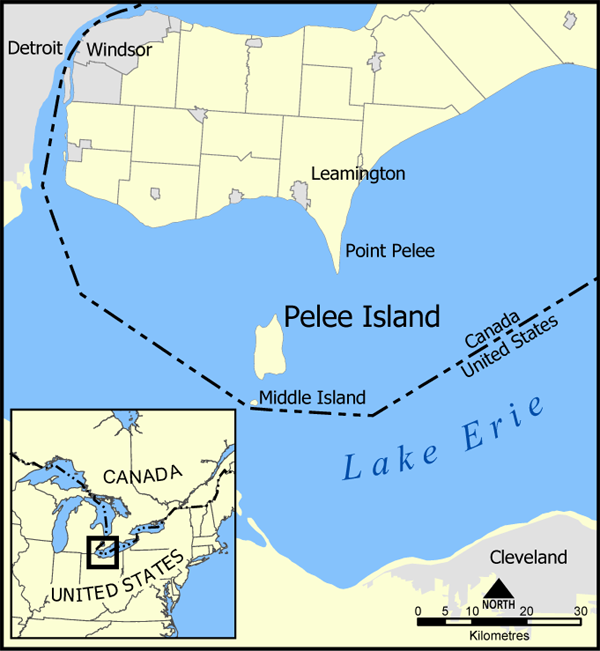

- Location within Ontario Location within Canada
- Coordinates: 41°46′30″N 82°39′35″W
- Country: Canada
- Province: Ontario
- Census division: Essex

Government
  - Mayor: Cathy Miller

Area
  - Total: 41.79 km^{2} (16.14 sq mi)

Population (2025)
  - Total: 300
  - Density: 7.2/km^{2} (19/sq mi)
- Area codes: 519, 226, 548

Pelee Island /ˈpiːli/ PEE-lee is an island in the Canadian province of Ontario. It is located in the western basin of Lake Erie. At 42 km^{2} (16 sq mi), Pelee Island is the largest island in Lake Erie and the southernmost populated point in Canada. An Ontario Historical Plaque was erected by the province to commemorate the development of Pelee Island's role in Ontario's heritage. Nearby Middle Island is the southernmost point of land in Canada.

Due to its southerly location and the moderating effect of Lake Erie, it has a slightly milder climate than inland areas. Its climate is one of the mildest in Canada, and the island has been used for vineyards and wine making since 1860, though local wine making died out in the early twentieth century and was restarted in the 1980s by the Pelee Island Winery. The island is an agricultural-based community, which grows about 2,000 hectares (5,000 acres) of soybeans, about 400 hectares (1,000 acres) of wheat, 200 hectares (500 acres) of grapes, and a few hectares of specialty corn.

The island is connected to the Canadian mainland and the United States by ferry service. It is a part of an important flyway for migrating birds between Ohio, the Lake Erie islands and Point Pelee. For many years, the island has hosted a fall pheasant hunt which attracts hunters from Canada, the United States and many other countries. The pheasant hunt brings tourist dollars to Pelee at a time of year when virtually no other activities are available, thus generating important revenue in the offseason.

== History ==
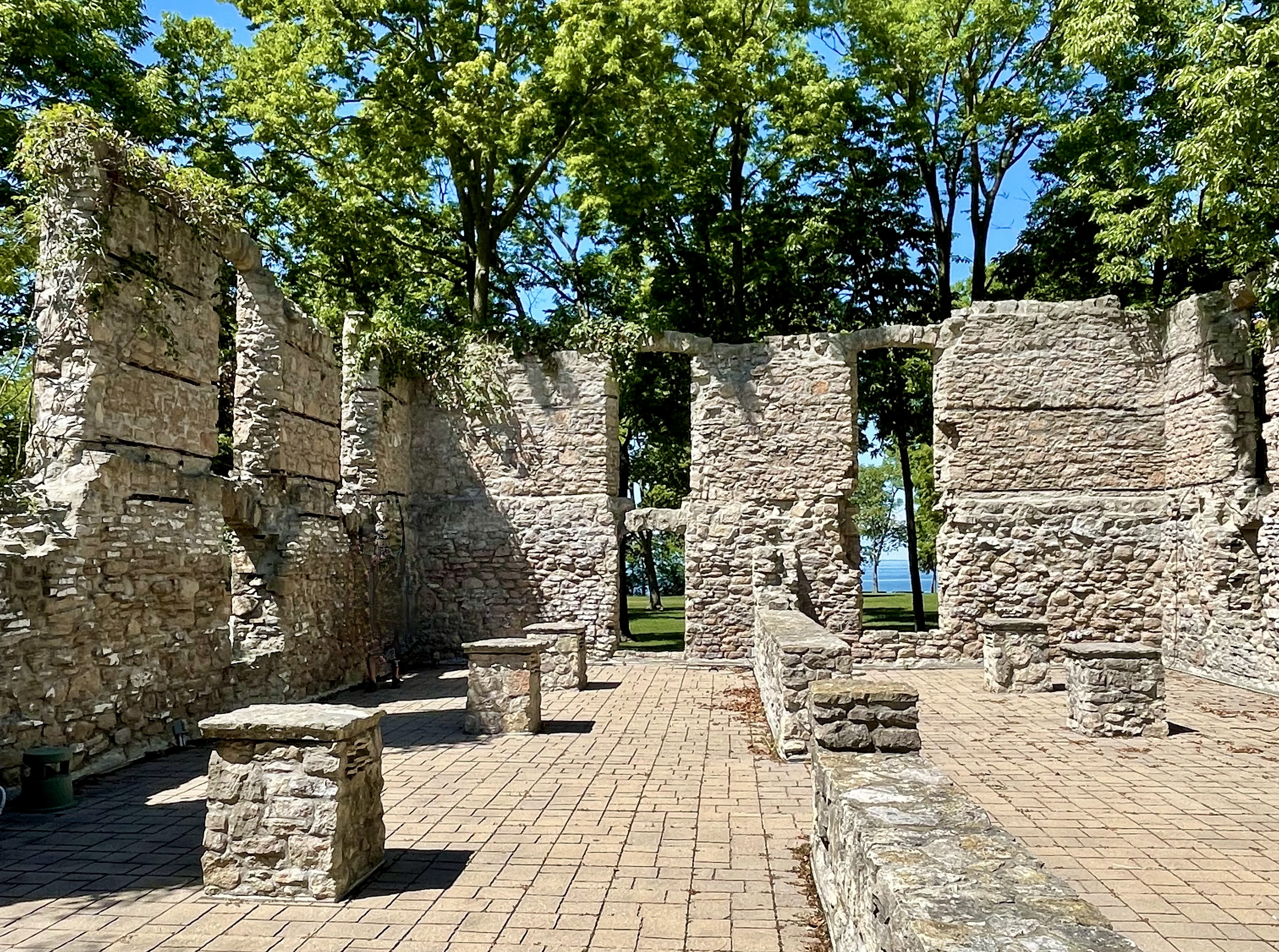
Remaining limestone walls of winery established in 1866

Evidence of occupation by indigenous peoples can be dated back 10,000 years through archaeological evidence of projectiles and ceremonial objects. European settlement of the island began in 1788 when the land was leased to Thomas McKee by the Ojibwa and Odawa tribes for 999 years, at a time when leases of 99 years were customary, raising doubt about the validity of the "999 year" lease. McKee's son sold it to William McCormick in 1823. McCormick and his family settled permanently on the island in 1834.

Questions of the legality of leasing or ownership of the island have persisted. After William McCormick's death in 1840, "speculation arose over the legality of McCormick's title to the island", with a court ruling in 1859 that his title was invalid, since the 999-year lease from the Caldwell First Nation, nor the length of possession constituted a sufficient legal title: "It was not shown that the possession held had been other than trespassers, nor that the Crown had ever taken charge of or received any rents from the island nor that it had been surveyed nor the title of the Indians extinguished". In 1865, McCormick's widow and children petitioned the government to issue a free grant of the island, noting that "they had been the first white owners of the island and had occupied it continuously since 1823". The legal proceedings raised questions about the validity and lawfulness of the 999 year McKee lease. The McCormick family petition was eventually granted, but this ruling failed to convince government authorities that the matter was resolved. An Order-in-Council passed on June 9, 1866, by both the Superintendent-General of Indian Affairs and the Solicitor General, included the condition that: "should any of the Indian tribes be in existence of those who originally owned the island, it would be necessary to obtain a surrender of their reversion". Even as late as 1923 Department of Indian Affairs official correspondence has noted that although the McCormicks continued to reside on Pelee Island, "no formal patent" had been issued because of a lack of compliance with certain conditions.

In addition to subsistence agriculture, the island's lumber, stone quarries, and fishing supported inhabitants. Wine-making on Pelee Island began in the 1860s.

Pelee Island features an original 1833 lighthouse that was once used to guide sailors through the rocky Pelee Passage. Pelee Passage contains the remains of at least 15 shipwrecks, with one wreck, JJ Carroll, 100 feet (30 m) off the eastern shore of Fish Point.

Pelee was the site of a battle during the Patriot War. The Battle of Pelee Island took place along what is now the Michigan-Ontario border in 1838 involving small groups of men on each side of the border seeking to "liberate" Upper Canada from the British. On February 26, 1838, 300 men captured the island, and on March 3 they were repulsed and either fled the island or were captured.

== Geography ==
=== Climate ===
Due to its southerly location and the moderating effect of Lake Erie, it has a slightly milder climate than inland areas. Its climate is one of the mildest in Canada outside of British Columbia, and the island has long been used for vineyards and wine making. It has the longest frost free season in Ontario. It lies within the Carolinian forest region. The island has a humid continental climate (Köppen climate classification Dfa) and falls into the USDA Plant Hardiness Zone 7a. Winters are cold with a January average of −5.0 °C (23.0 °F) and the average annual snowfall is 76 centimetres (29.9 in), which falls mainly from November to April. Summers are warm and humid with a July high of 27.5 °C (81.5 °F) and a low of 18.9 °C (66.0 °F). Temperatures rarely go over 32 °C (89.6 °F), averaging 4 days per year.

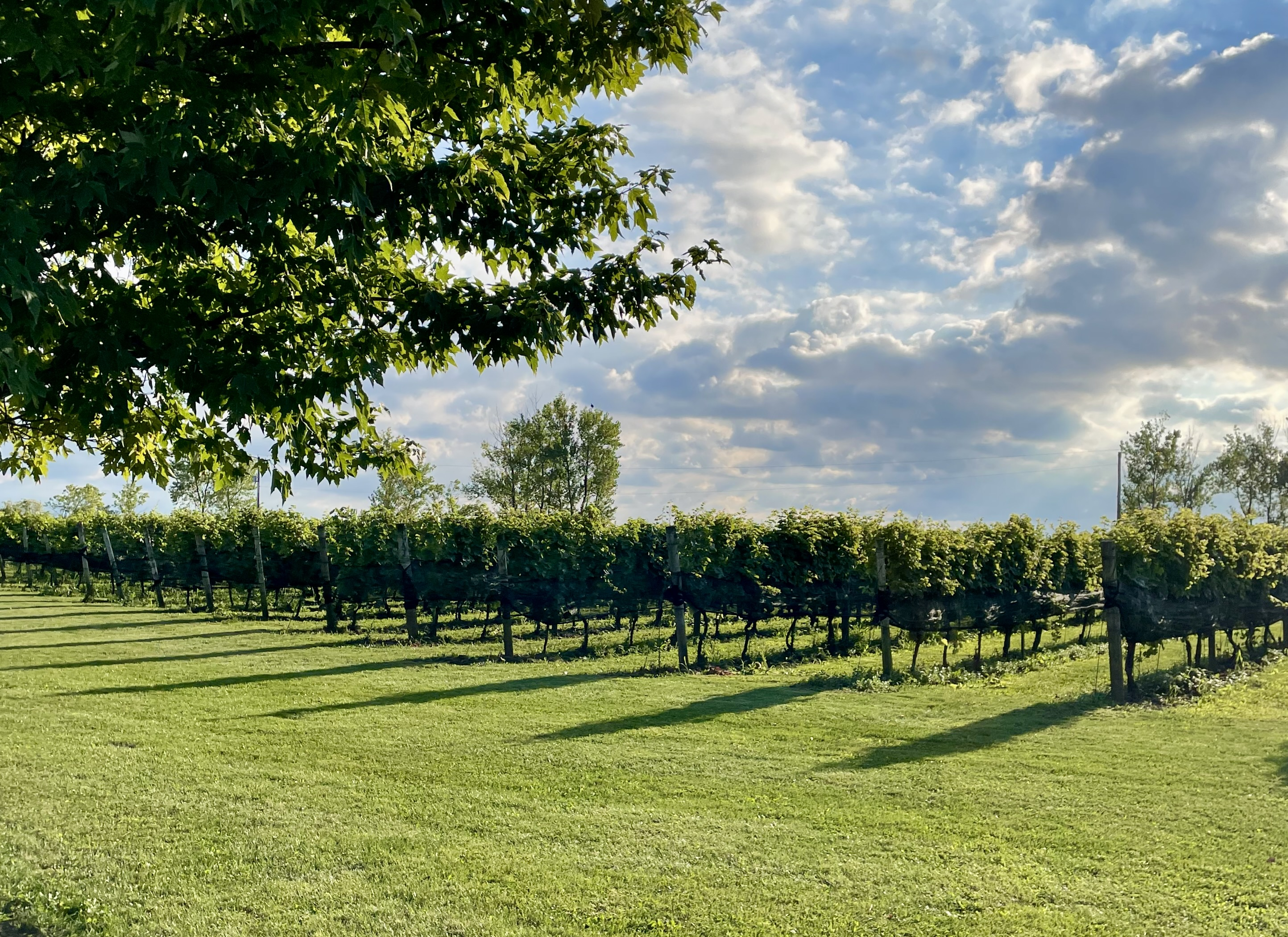
Vineyards on Pelee Island in summer

Pelee island and Point Pelee receive the fewest days with precipitation in Ontario, averaging 75 days with measurable precipitation, and drought-like conditions occur every 4–5 years. The average annual precipitation is 891 millimetres (35 in) which is evenly distributed throughout the year with January and February being the driest months. The record low was −31.5 °C (−24.7 °F) on January 20, 1985, and the record high was 41.1 °C (106.0 °F) on July 24, 1934.

Climate data for Pelee Island
| Month | Jan | Feb | Mar | Apr | May | Jun | Jul | Aug | Sep | Oct | Nov | Dec | Year |
|---|---|---|---|---|---|---|---|---|---|---|---|---|---|
| Record high °C (°F) | 17.2 (63.0) | 18.3 (64.9) | 23.9 (75.0) | 33.0 (91.4) | 37.2 (99.0) | 40.6 (105.1) | 41.1 (106.0) | 37.8 (100.0) | 36.7 (98.1) | 31.1 (88.0) | 24.4 (75.9) | 18.0 (64.4) | 41.1 (106.0) |
| Mean daily maximum °C (°F) | −2.0 (28.4) | −0.3 (31.5) | 5.1 (41.2) | 11.3 (52.3) | 18.0 (64.4) | 24.2 (75.6) | 27.5 (81.5) | 26.3 (79.3) | 22.7 (72.9) | 16.2 (61.2) | 8.1 (46.6) | 1.8 (35.2) | 13.2 (55.8) |
| Daily mean °C (°F) | −5 (23) | −3.6 (25.5) | 1.7 (35.1) | 7.4 (45.3) | 13.9 (57.0) | 19.9 (67.8) | 23.2 (73.8) | 22.2 (72.0) | 18.5 (65.3) | 12.4 (54.3) | 5.4 (41.7) | −0.9 (30.4) | 9.6 (49.3) |
| Mean daily minimum °C (°F) | −8.1 (17.4) | −7.0 (19.4) | −1.9 (28.6) | 3.4 (38.1) | 9.7 (49.5) | 15.5 (59.9) | 18.9 (66.0) | 18.1 (64.6) | 14.2 (57.6) | 8.6 (47.5) | 2.5 (36.5) | −3.7 (25.3) | 5.8 (42.4) |
| Record low °C (°F) | −31.5 (−24.7) | −27.2 (−17.0) | −21.1 (−6.0) | −15.0 (5.0) | −1.7 (28.9) | 1.1 (34.0) | 5.6 (42.1) | 5.0 (41.0) | 1.1 (34.0) | −5.6 (21.9) | −12.8 (9.0) | −24.5 (−12.1) | −31.5 (−24.7) |
| Average precipitation mm (inches) | 47.2 (1.86) | 39.5 (1.56) | 67.9 (2.67) | 82.0 (3.23) | 86.4 (3.40) | 92.2 (3.63) | 78.9 (3.11) | 87.4 (3.44) | 86.0 (3.39) | 55.5 (2.19) | 83.7 (3.30) | 84.1 (3.31) | 890.8 (35.07) |
| Average rainfall mm (inches) | 24.2 (0.95) | 23.0 (0.91) | 58.7 (2.31) | 79.9 (3.15) | 86.4 (3.40) | 92.2 (3.63) | 78.9 (3.11) | 87.4 (3.44) | 86.0 (3.39) | 55.5 (2.19) | 79.3 (3.12) | 64.5 (2.54) | 816.1 (32.13) |
| Average snowfall cm (inches) | 23.0 (9.1) | 18.3 (7.2) | 9.0 (3.5) | 2.1 (0.8) | 0 (0) | 0 (0) | 0 (0) | 0 (0) | 0 (0) | 0 (0) | 4.1 (1.6) | 19.6 (7.7) | 76.0 (29.9) |
| Average precipitation days (≥ 0.2 mm) | 6 | 6 | 7 | 8 | 7 | 8 | 7 | 7 | 7 | 6 | 8 | 8 | 84 |
| Average rainy days (≥ 0.2 mm) | 2 | 2 | 5 | 7 | 7 | 8 | 7 | 7 | 7 | 6 | 7 | 5 | 70 |
| Average snowy days (≥ 0.2 cm) | 5 | 4 | 2 | 1 | 0 | 0 | 0 | 0 | 0 | 0 | 1 | 4 | 15 |
Source: Environment Canada

== Demographics ==
In the 2021 Census of Population conducted by Statistics Canada, Pelee had a population of 230 living in 122 of its 374 total private dwellings, a change of −2.1% from its 2016 population of 235. With a land area of 41.03 km^{2} (15.84 sq mi), it had a population density of 5.6/km^{2} (14.5/sq mi) in 2021.

The island was "settled by a mixed group of Canadians and Americans" and many Americans still inhabit the island.

== Economy ==
=== Tourism ===
Pelee Island is a popular tourist destination, with thousands of visitors each year. There are several key events such as the Annual Springsong Weekend, a celebration of birds and books, traditionally held on Mother's day weekend, and hosted by famed Canadian author Margaret Atwood. Pelee Island Stone & Sky Music & Art Series feature spoken word, live performance and visual arts weekly for the duration of the summer. The Stone & Sky Farmer's Market is held every Saturday in the Quarry throughout the summer. The southernmost Chili Cook Off takes place at the Pelee Island Winery Pavilion. The season wraps with the Heritage Weekend, hosted by the Pelee Island Heritage Centre.

Canada Day is celebrated on the island with a fireworks display and a parade along the West Shore Road.

The Pelee Island Half Marathon attracts runners from both the United States and Canada to participate in what is billed as Canada's southernmost and most exclusive half-marathon. Only about 350 runners are allowed to register for the race which is held the first weekend in June.

The Pelee Island Heritage Centre offers information about Pelee Island's physical features, archaeology, non-Indigenous history and Island residents.

==== Ecotourism ====
Pelee Island has features that make it an ecotourist destination. Pelee is the southernmost inhabited part of Canada and is situated on two major migratory bird routes, the Atlantic Flyway and the Mississippi flyway. The island has been designated as a globally Important Bird Area (IBA) by the Canadian partners of BirdLife International: the Canadian Nature Federation (CNF) and Bird Studies Canada (BSC). IBAs are described as “truly outstanding sites of significance nationally or internationally and sites that are exceptionally important for birds”. Every year the return of the migratory birds is celebrated on Pelee with the Annual Springsong Weekend, usually taking place on Mother's Day weekend. Pelee Island Bird Observatory located on the island work to conserve and study birds on the island, and offers visitors the opportunity to take part in tracking, tagging and photographing the wide variety of species present.

Pelee Island is one of Ontario's most botanically significant sites, and features several Nature Conservancy of Canada areas, and two Provincial Nature Reserves, Lighthouse Point Nature Reserve and Fish Point Nature Reserve. Glaciation left a variety of habitats for wildlife, such as wetlands, sand dunes, alvars (areas of limestone with a shallow overburden), and deep soils suitable to the trees of the Eastern Deciduous Forest zone. Pelee Island is home to numerous species at risk including both flora and fauna as well as insects, snails, mammals, birds, reptiles, and amphibians.

== Government ==
Pelee Island constitutes most of the Township of Pelee which has its own mayor, deputy mayor, and three councillors. It is a separated township, not administratively part of any county (for census purposes, it is treated as part of Essex County). The township comprises nine islands, the largest and only inhabited one being Pelee Island. The other islands are Middle Island, Middle Sister Island, Hen Island, Big Chicken Island, Little Chicken Island, Chick Island, East Sister Island, and North Harbour Island. The total land area of all islands in the township is 41.84 km^{2} (16.15 sq mi).

== Infrastructure ==
=== Transportation ===
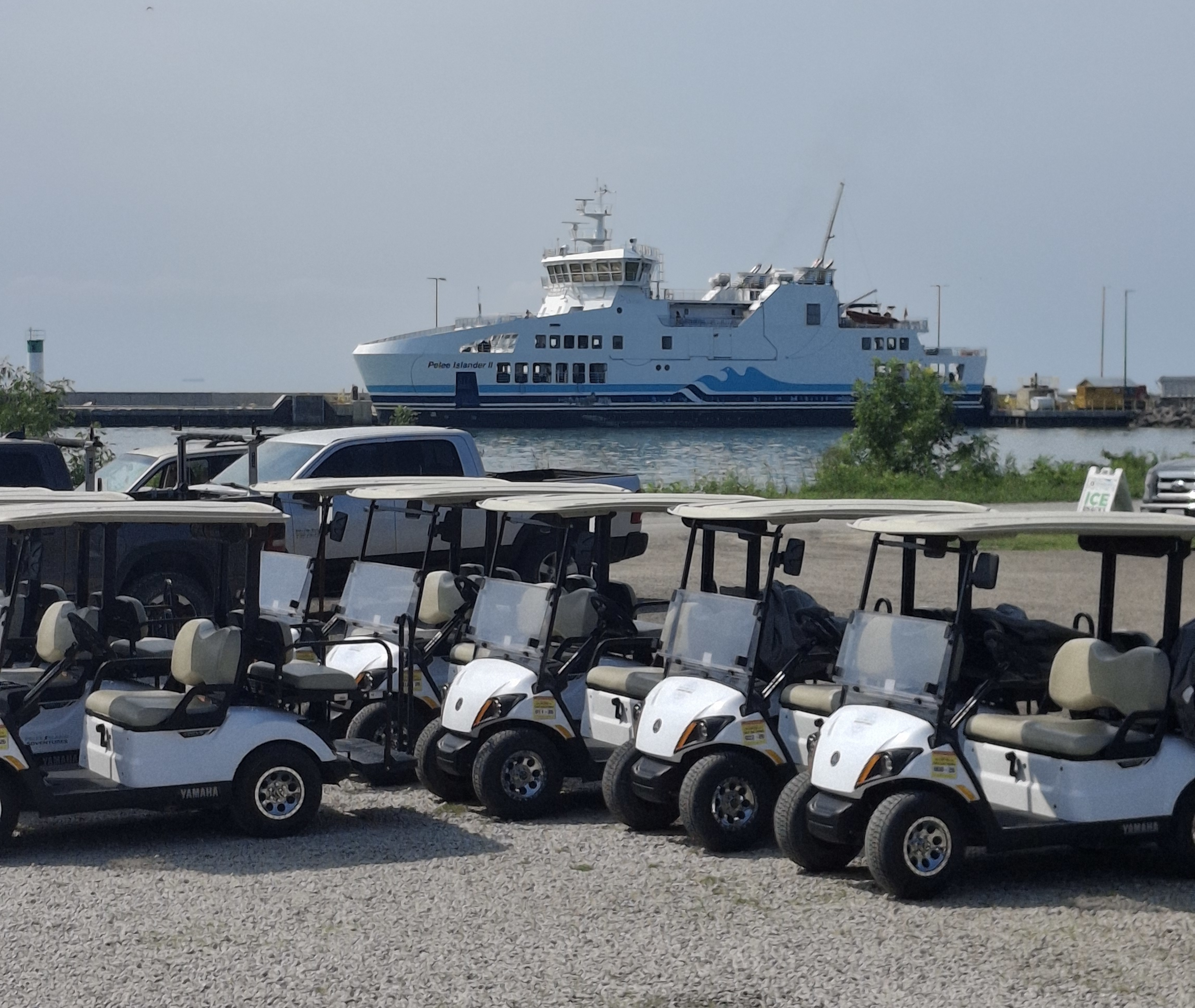
MV Pelee Islander II docked at the island ferry dock, with rentable golf carts in the foreground. A pilot program launched in 2021 allows residents and visitors to drive golf carts on public roads.

The island is serviced by two ferries, MV Pelee Islander and MV Pelee Islander II (owned by Pelee Island Transportation Company, a subsidiary of Owen Sound Transportation Company). MV Pelee Islander II is the largest passenger ferry along the Lake Erie route to Pelee Island. The leisurely cruise to Pelee Island can range from one-and-a-half to just over two hours depending on departure routes. The ferry service splits the season between Leamington and Kingsville on the Ontario mainland. Leaving from Leamington from early spring until August, the ferry then finishes the season (mid December) in nearby Kingsville. The ferry from Pelee Island to Sandusky, Ohio runs only from late spring until early fall, while MV Pelee Islander II runs from the Canadian ports of Leamington and/or Kingsville from early spring until early December. When the ferries are not operating, the only practical way to get to the mainland or to Pelee Island is via an airplane to the Pelee Island Airport. In January 2004, a Cessna 208 Caravan crashed on takeoff from Pelee, killing eight pheasant hunters, the pilot and his girlfriend. The plane crashed into the shallow waters of Lake Erie. It is believed the plane was overloaded and potentially ice-laden according to the Transportation Safety Board of Canada report.

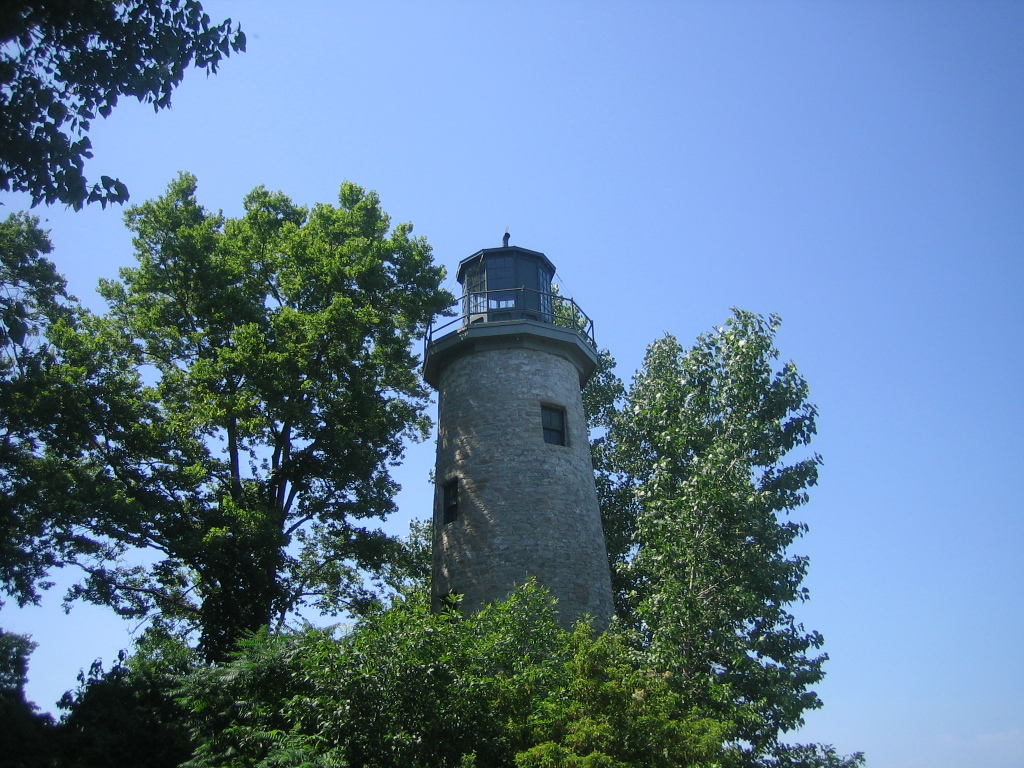
Lighthouse at Pelee Island

The MV Pelee Islander, which continues to operate, carries 196 passengers and 14 vehicles. MV Upper Canada, which serviced Pelee prior to MV Jiimaan, was sent to Lake Huron (the people of Christian Island received her for transport to and from the mainland) when MV Jiimaan began service to Pelee. MV Pelee Islander was built at Erieau, Ontario in 1960.

In June 2015, the Ontario Government announced that it would invest $40 million in a new ferry, to replace MV Pelee Islander. A tender was awarded to Asenav of Chile to build the replacement ferry, MV Pelee Islander II, which carries 399 passengers and 34 vehicles.

During the winter season (starting December 11 until the start of the ferry the next year) Pelee Island Transportation Company operates an air service to the Pelee Island Airport from Windsor.

In 2021, the Ontario government launched a 10-year pilot program allowing island residents and visitors to drive golf carts on public roads, with the goal of increasing tourism and transportation options.

=== Emergency services ===
There is a medical clinic on the island operated by the Victorian Order of Nurses. This Nursing Station has regular hours of operation during the summer but does not respond to emergencies. In the event of an emergency, visitors or residents of the island are instructed to call 911. Essex-Windsor EMS are on the Island 365 days a year to provide emergency paramedic services. Air Ambulance services are also available to airlift patients to the nearest hospital if necessary.

The Pelee Island Volunteer Fire Department is present on the Island 365 days a year and responds to 911 calls on the Island; the department is made up of a fire chief, a deputy fire chief, and volunteers.

Police services on the island are provided by the Ontario Provincial Police. Officers are present on the island four days a week during the summer, during the annual pheasant hunt in the fall, and on the long weekend in May. During the winter, police will fly to the island to respond to emergency calls only. There are typically two officers on the island at a time. The OPP detachment is located on the second floor of the municipal building.

== Education ==
Pelee Island has one school which is part of the Greater Essex County District School Board and serves students from Junior Kindergarten through grade 8. Children on the island can choose to attend high school on the mainland or they can complete high school courses online with the assistance of the teachers at Pelee Island Public School. The school has a student population of about 10 to 20 pupils at any given time and a staff of two to three teachers. Classes are held in a traditional three room school house that was built in 1927 and is located at the north west corner of the island. Every year the children of the school raise money for an annual field trip by holding a raffle during the island's fall pheasant hunt.

== See also ==
- List of townships in Ontario
