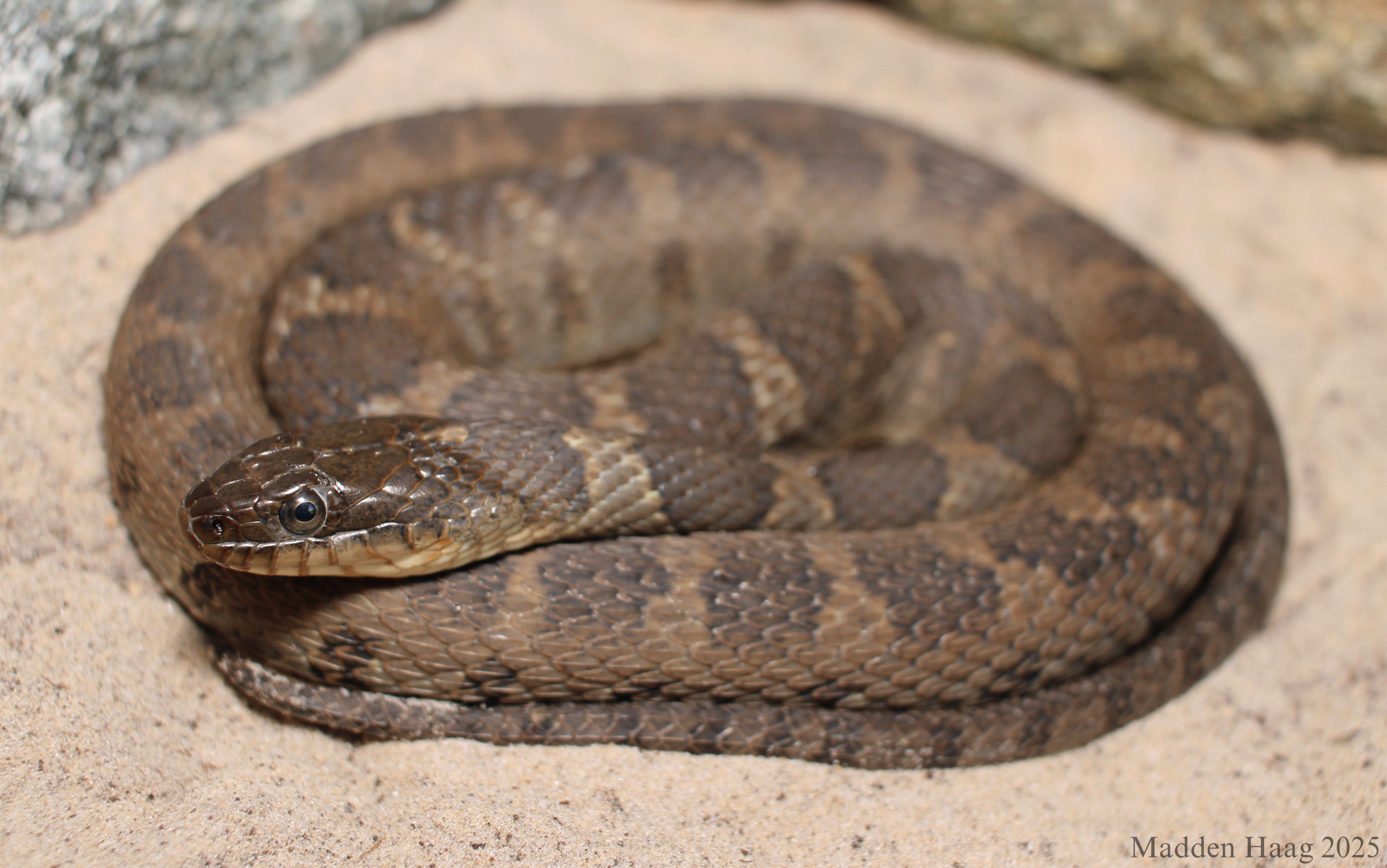
- Lake Erie watersnake (Nerodia sipedon insularum)

Conservation status
- Imperiled (NatureServe)

- Delisted (ESA)

Scientific classification
- Kingdom: Animalia
- Phylum: Chordata
- Class: Reptilia
- Order: Squamata
- Suborder: Serpentes
- Family: Colubridae
- Genus: Nerodia
- Species: N. sipedon
- Subspecies: N. s. insularum

Trinomial name
- Nerodia sipedon insularum (Conant and Clay, 1937)

Synonyms
- Natrix sipedon subsp. insularum Conant & Clay, 1937

= Lake Erie watersnake =

Subspecies of watersnake

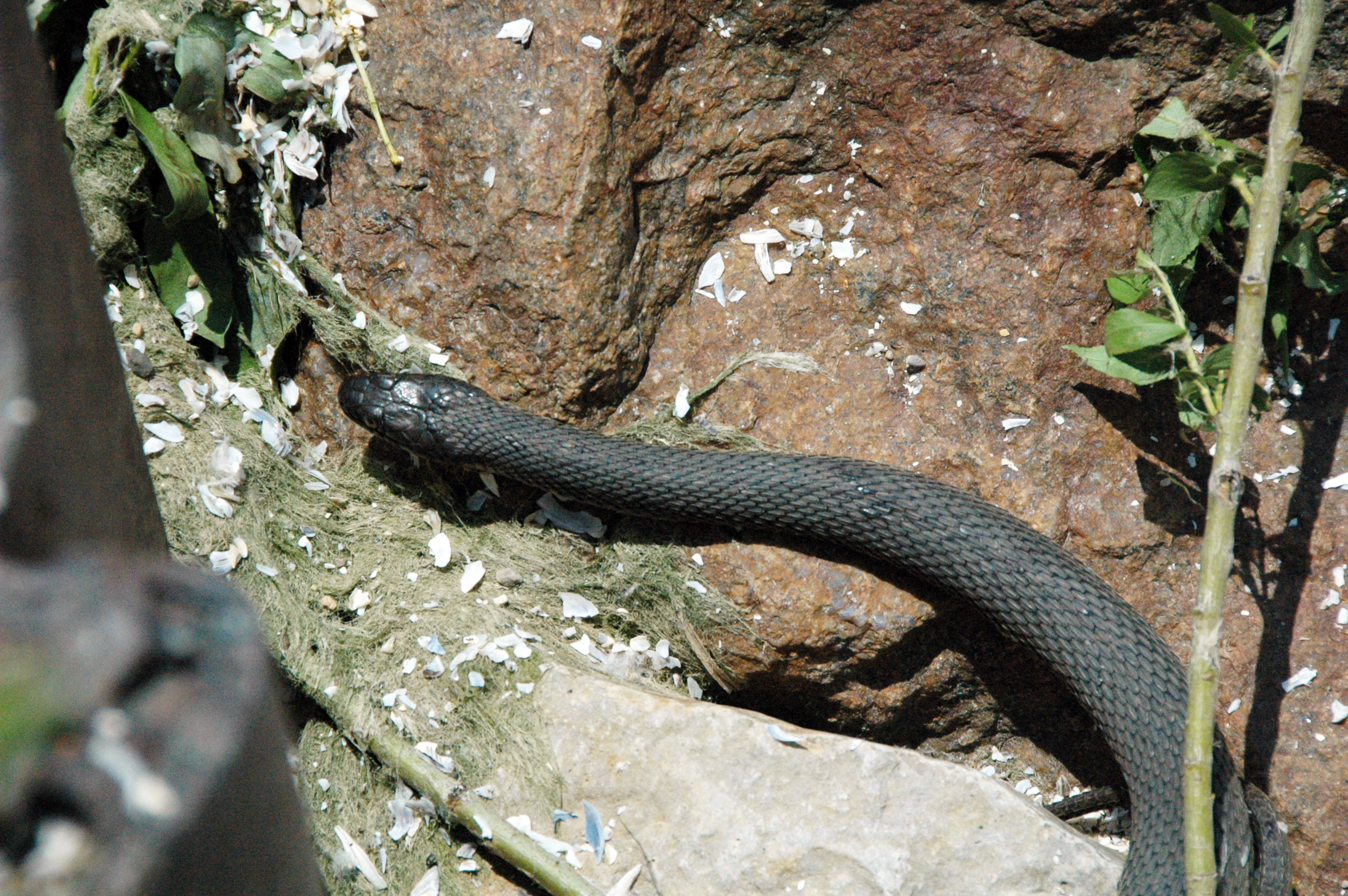
The Lake Erie watersnake is one of the rarest reptiles on Earth.

The Lake Erie watersnake (Nerodia sipedon insularum), a subspecies of the common watersnake, is a nonvenomous natricine snake. It is found on the offshore islands of Western Lake Erie, as well as the mainland of Ottawa County, Ohio. In 1999 the U.S. Fish and Wildlife Service listed the subspecies as a threatened subspecies after the population fell to 1,500 individuals. In 2011, the subspecies was removed from the list after the population increased to nearly 12,000 individuals by 2009.

== Description ==
The Lake Erie watersnake varies in its appearance. Males can reach 59–71 cm (23–28 in) in length, while females can reach 80–88 cm (31–35 in). The subspecies is closely related to the northern watersnake, but its dorsal brown bands are less prominent, giving it a more uniformly gray appearance. This allows the snake to use gray stones as camouflage. Some specimens lack brown bands and appear uniformly gray, while others are gray with faint brown bands and blotches on the dorsal side. The ventral side is generally white or yellowish-white.

Newborns are around 18 cm (7.1 in) long and weigh 4.8 g (0.17 oz). Litter sizes can range anywhere from fewer than 9 individuals to more than 50 individuals. Males become sexually mature at two years, while females become sexually mature at three years.

== Distribution ==
The Lake Erie watersnake is found only on 15 islands in the Western end of Lake Erie and the Marblehead Peninsula of Ottawa County, Ohio. In Canadian waters, the subspecies is found on East Sister Island, Pelee Island, Middle Island, and Hen Island. In Ohio waters, it is found on 11 islands, including Kelleys Island and South Bass Island. Its distribution range is less than 40 kilometers in diameter, making it one of the smallest distribution ranges of any snake in North America.

== Habitat ==
The Lake Erie watersnake spends time on both land and in water. On land, it is typically found near shorelines containing rocks, wood, and vegetation, usually staying within 200 meters of the shoreline during the summer. These areas allow the snake to bask, mate, shelter, and give birth. The subspecies can also be found in sandy areas or land without vegetation to a lesser extent. In water, it usually stays within 13 meters of the shoreline.

The Lake Erie watersnake hibernates during the winter, often traveling further inland than during the summer. Hibernacula include rock piles, building foundations, and drainage tiles. It hibernates both alone and with other species of snake.

== Diet ==
Before the 1990s, the Lake Erie watersnake fed mostly on amphibians and native fish. However, in the 1990s, the round goby was introduced to Lake Erie, decimating native fish and amphibian populations. Today, the round goby accounts for 90% of the Lake Erie watersnake's diet.

== Conservation ==
When European settlers first arrived at the Western Lake Erie islands, the Lake Erie watersnake was so ubiquitous they nicknamed them the "Serpent Islands". Tourists and islanders began intentionally killing them in the 1950s, incorrectly thinking they were venomous. Increased residential development also contributed to the subspecies' decline. By the 1990s, less than 2,000 individuals remained, causing the U.S. Fish and Wildlife Service to classify it as threatened in 1999. To recover the population, the United States protected 300 acres (120 ha) of inland habitat and 11 miles (18 km) of shoreline as breeding grounds. By 2009, the population had recovered to nearly 12,000 individuals. The introduction of the round goby also contributed to its recovery. In 2011, the Lake Erie watersnake became the 23rd animal to be removed from the federal Threatened and Endangered Species list.
