= North Harbour Island =

Island in Ontario, Canada

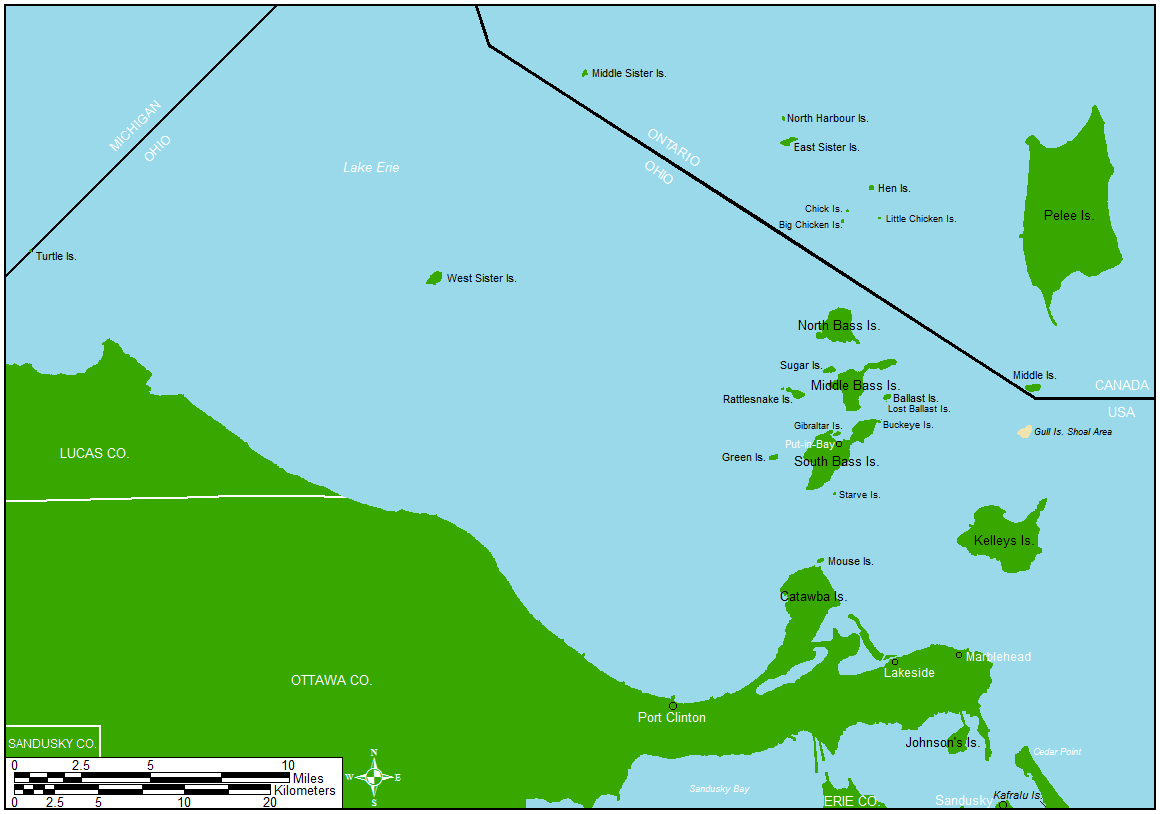
- North Harbour Island is just north of East Sister Island

Geography
- Location: Lake Erie
- Coordinates: 41°49′30″N 82°51′36″W
- Archipelago: Pelee Island Archipelago
- Major islands: Pelee Island, East Sister Island and West Sister Island
- Highest elevation: 571 ft (174 m)

Administration
- Canada
- Province: Ontario
- County: Essex
- Township: Pelee

North Harbour Island is an island in Ontario, Canada, located in Lake Erie, approximately 14.5 km west of the nearest point on Pelee Island. The tiny, privately owned island has one home and a storage shed.
