= Ottawa National Wildlife Refuge =

Protected area in Ohio, United States

- IUCN category IV (habitat/species management area)
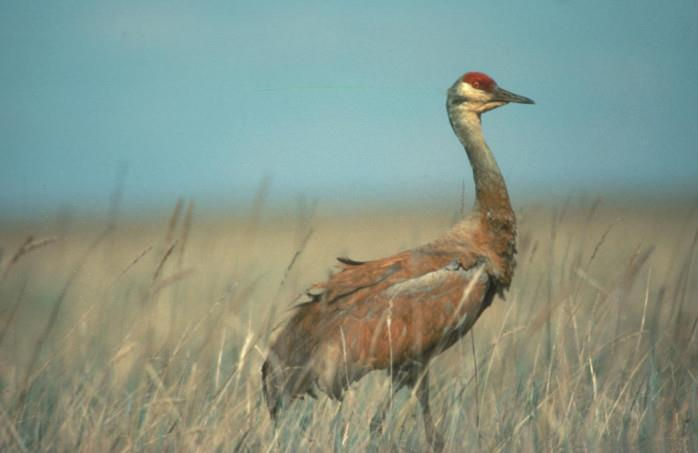
- A sandhill crane at the refuge

- Location within the United States Location within Ohio
- Location: Lucas, Ottawa counties, Ohio, United States
- Nearest city: Port Clinton, Ohio
- Coordinates: 41°36′56″N 83°12′58″W
- Area: 6,857.91 acres (27.7530 km^{2})
- Established: 1961
- Governing body: U.S. Fish and Wildlife Service
- Website: Ottawa National Wildlife Refuge

Ottawa National Wildlife Refuge is a National Wildlife Refuge of the United States, which is located in the state of Ohio. This refuge was established in 1961, under the Migratory Bird Conservation Act, the purpose of the refuge being created was “… for use as an inviolate sanctuary, or for any other management purpose, for migratory birds”. 16 U.S.C. 715d. This refuge provides ideal habitat for a wide range for migratory birds and waterfowl, along with the native wildlife, and any endangered and threatened species. The property of the refuge was purchased from hunt clubs and farmlands with the Federal Duck Stamps.

The refuge, itself is about 7,000 acres (28 km^{2}). This region has historically been important to fish, migratory waterfowl, songbirds, and shorebirds. Large numbers of migrating songbirds stop in the area to rest during their spring migration. The refuge is an attraction for birdwatching enthusiasts. Ottawa has the ideal habitat for birds that are coming through the area during migration season. Which makes it a great place for those who enjoy birdwatching it is also a great place for birdwatching even when not during migration season. It is also home to several bald eagles. This wildlife refuge has been designated as a site of regional significance in the Western Hemisphere Shorebird Reserve Network. In 2002, Birder's World readers voted the refuge as one of their Top 15 favorite spots to see birds, and the American Bird Conservancy has identified the refuge as an Important Bird Area.

== Background ==
When the refuge was first established it only started with 4,682 acres (18.95 km^{2}) and the main idea for it was created to preserve a remnant of the formerly vast Lake Erie coastal wetlands. The refuge has now expanded to approximately 7,000 acres (28 km^{2}). The purchasing of the land was authorized through the Migratory Bird Conservation and the Hunting Stamp Act (also known as the Duck Stamp Act). Along with managing Ottawa, the USFWS also manages two other sites, the Cedar Point and West Sister Island refuges. The three refuges together bring to a total over 10,000 acres (40 km^{2}) that the staff manages. The three refuges help protect some of what is left of the Great Black Swamp which is in the heart of Lake Erie marshes.

== Exploring Ottawa ==
There are many ways to exploring Ottawa National Wildlife Refuge, whether it be hiking on the dikes, which help maintain the water levels in the pools, going on the Wildlife Drive, or going on a Tram Tour that is provided by the Ottawa visitor center.
