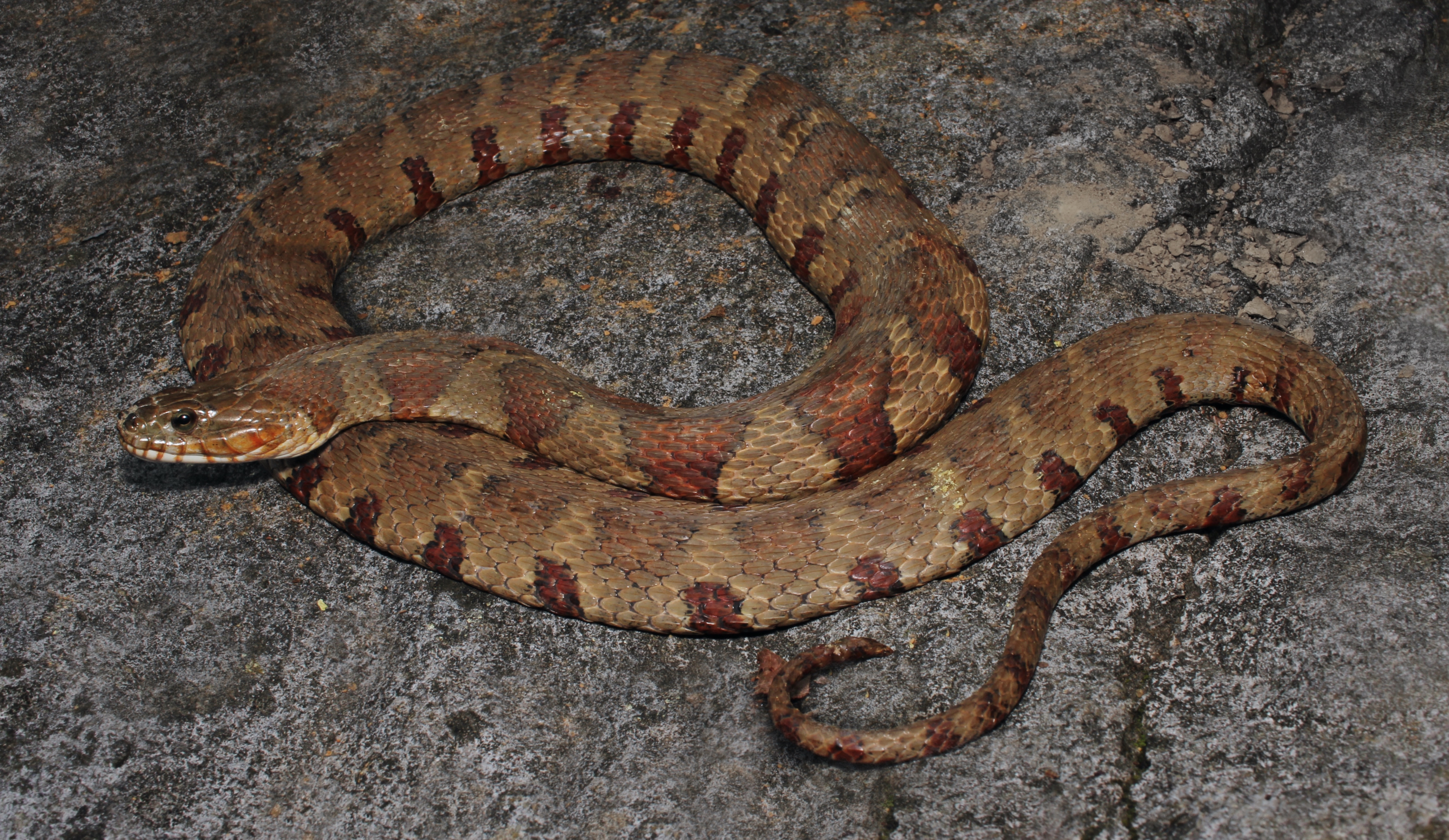

Conservation status
- Secure (NatureServe)

Scientific classification
- Kingdom: Animalia
- Phylum: Chordata
- Class: Reptilia
- Order: Squamata
- Suborder: Serpentes
- Family: Colubridae
- Genus: Nerodia
- Species: N. sipedon
- Subspecies: N. s. pleuralis

Trinomial name
- Nerodia sipedon pleuralis (Cope, 1892)

Synonyms
- Natrix fasciata pleuralis Cope, 1892; Natrix sipedon pleuralis Cope, 1892; Nerodia sipedon pleuralis (Cope, 1892)

= Nerodia sipedon pleuralis =

Subspecies of snake

Nerodia sipedon pleuralis, the midland water snake, a subspecies of the common watersnake (Nerodia sipedon), is a nonvenomous natricine snake, which is endemic to North America.

== Geographic range ==
It is found in the central and southern United States, more specifically, in Alabama, northern Arkansas, northwestern Georgia, southern Illinois, southern Indiana, western Kentucky, southeastern Louisiana, Mississippi, southern Missouri, southeastern Oklahoma, northwestern South Carolina, and western and southeastern Tennessee.

== Description ==
Anteriorly, it has a pattern of dark crossbands on a light ground color. Posteriorly, the crossbands are replaced by three rows of alternating squarish blotches. The light spaces between the crossbands or blotches are wider than the dark markings. On the belly, the crescent-shaped markings on the ventrals tend to form two stripe-like series.

The maximum recorded total length for this subspecies is 131 cm (51.5 inches). However, most adults are 56–102 cm (22-40 inches) in total length.

== Habitat ==
This snake lives in wet habitats such as marshes, ponds, streams, and swales. In the Southern United States, it follows river valleys to the Gulf Coast.

== Diet ==
Nerodia sipedon pleuralis has a diet that is similar to other species of water snakes. Juvenile and small adults consume a variety of prey such as fishes, frogs, and salamanders. Adults consume primarily fishes.
