= Big Chicken Island =

Island in Ontario, Canada

Coordinates: 41.7704°N 82.8177°W

Big Chicken Island is a small, flat, treeless island in Ontario located within Lake Erie. Although it is called an island, it is actually a reef. It is one of the three "chickens" that surround Hen Island, the other two being Chick Island and Little Chicken Island.

The island is located near the water boundary between Canada and the United States in Lake Erie.
