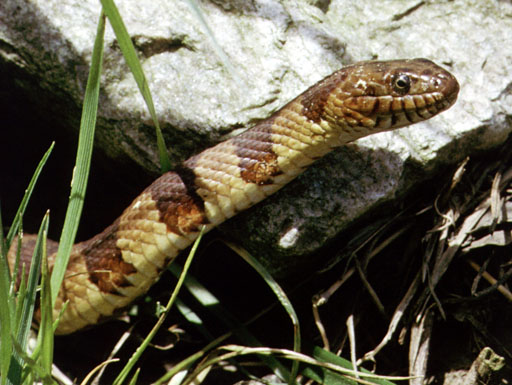

Conservation status
- Least Concern (IUCN 3.1)

Scientific classification
- Kingdom: Animalia
- Phylum: Chordata
- Class: Reptilia
- Order: Squamata
- Suborder: Serpentes
- Family: Colubridae
- Genus: Nerodia
- Species: N. sipedon

Binomial name
- Nerodia sipedon (Linnaeus, 1758)

Subspecies
- Four, see text

Synonyms
- List: Coluber sipedon Linnaeus, 1758; Tropidonotus sipedon — Holbrook, 1842; Nerodia sipedon — Baird & Girard, 1853; Natrix sipedon — Stejneger & Barbour, 1917; Nerodia sipedon — Stebbins, 1985\

= Common watersnake =

Species of snake

The common watersnake (Nerodia sipedon) is a species of large, nonvenomous, common snake in the family Colubridae. The species is native to North America. It is frequently mistaken for the venomous cottonmouth (Agkistrodon piscivorus).

== Common names ==
Common names for N. sipedon include banded water snake, black water adder, black water snake, brown water snake, common water snake, common northern water snake, eastern water snake, North American water snake, northern banded water snake, northern water snake, spotted water snake, streaked snake, water pilot, and water snake.

== Description ==
The common watersnake can grow up to 135 cm (4 ft 5 in) in total length (including tail). Per one study, the average total length of females was 81.4 cm (2 ft 8 in), while that of males was 69.6 cm (2 ft 3 1/2 in). From known studies of this species in the wild, adult females can weigh between 159 and 408 g (5 1/2 and 14 1/2 oz) typically, while the smaller male can range from 80.8 to 151 g (2 7/8 to 5 3/8 oz). The largest females can weigh up to 560 g (20 oz) while the largest males can scale 370 g (13 oz).

N. sipedon can be brown, gray, reddish, or brownish-black. It has dark crossbands on the neck and dark blotches on the rest of the body, often leading to misidentification as a cottonmouth or copperhead by novices. As N. sipedon ages, the color darkens, and the pattern becomes obscure. Some individuals become almost completely black. The belly also varies in color. It can be white, yellow, or gray; usually, it also has reddish or black crescents.

The common watersnake is nonvenomous and harmless to humans, but superficially resembles the venomous cottonmouth. It is often killed by humans out of fear; attempting to kill snakes greatly increases the chance of being bitten. The two can be easily distinguished: the watersnake has a longer, more slender body and a flattened head the same width as the neck, round pupils, and no heat-sensing pits. The cottonmouth has a fatter body, a wedge-shaped head with prominent venom glands that are wider than the neck, cat-like pupils, and heat-sensing pits between the eyes and the nostrils.

== Subspecies ==
These four subspecies are recognized as being valid:

Image	Subspecies	Common name
	N. s. sipedon (Linnaeus, 1758)	northern watersnake
	N. s. insularum (Conant & Clay, 1937)	Lake Erie watersnake
	N. s. pleuralis (Cope, 1892)	midland watersnake
	N. s. williamengelsi (Conant & Lazell, 1973)	Carolina watersnake

Nota bene: A trinomial authority in parentheses indicates that the subspecies was originally described in a genus other than Nerodia.

== Geographic range ==
The common watersnake is found throughout eastern and central North America, from southern Ontario and southern Quebec in the north, to Texas and Florida in the south. The northern watersnake (Nerodia s. sipedon) naturally occurs as far west as Colorado, east of the Rocky Mountains, and is commonly found in riparian ecosystems along river systems, such as the South Platte River and Arkansas River. In 2007 an introduced population was discovered in California, where the related species N. fasciata has been introduced since at least 1992.

=== Introduction ===
While native to the eastern US, water snakes in California are considered invasive species likely to compete with native giant garter snake Thamnophis gigas, a threatened species. Garter snakes in the western U.S. have filled the aquatic snake niche in the absence of true water snakes. The common watersnake may threaten vulnerable fish and amphibian species via excess predation. Common watersnakes are thought to have been introduced to western states as pets that were released. In 2008 it was made illegal in California to own or import common watersnakes without a permit.

== Behavior ==
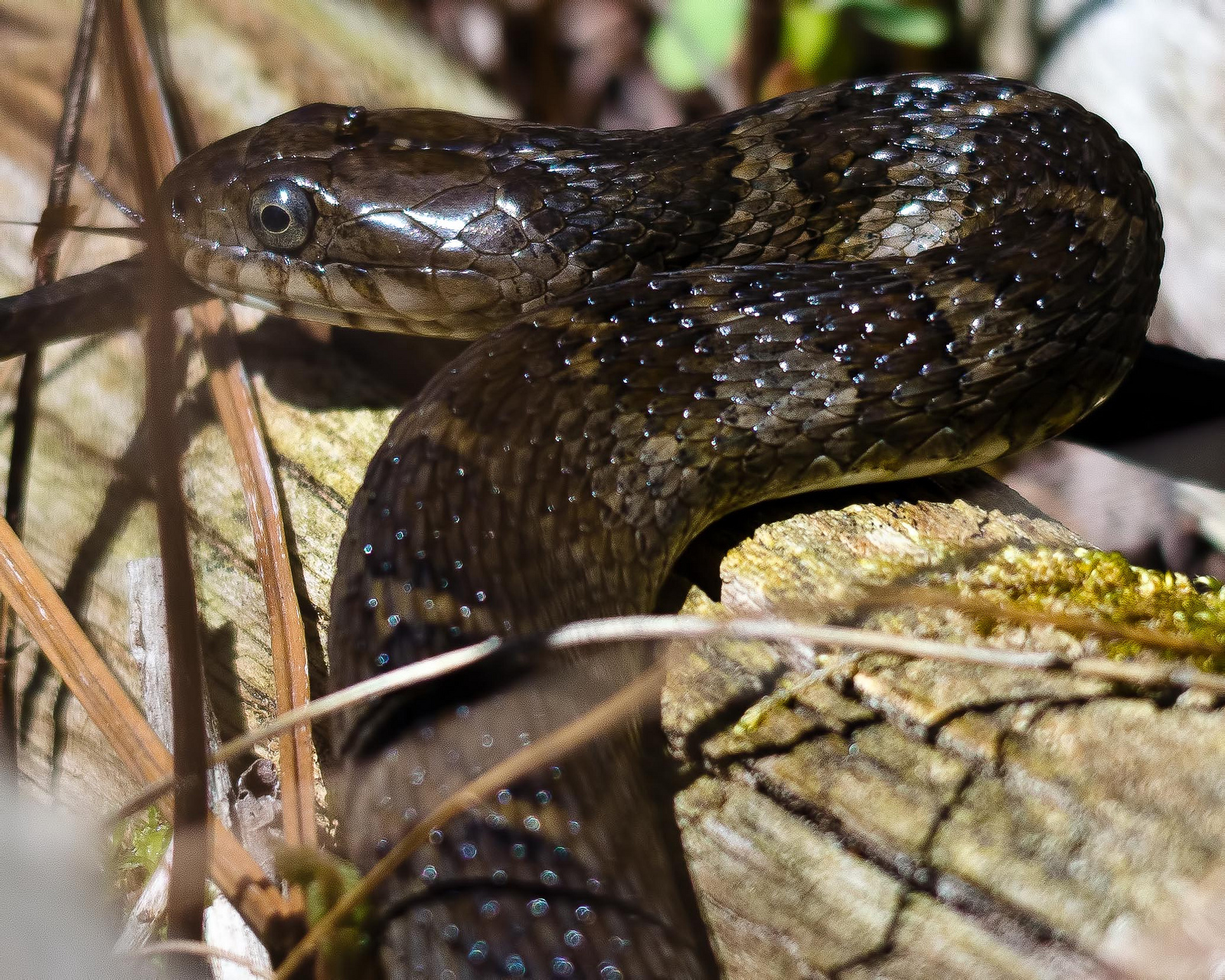
Northern watersnake basking west of Ottawa, Ontario

N. sipedon is active during the day and at night. It is most often seen basking on rocks, stumps, or brush. During the day, it hunts among plants at the water's edge, looking for small fish, tadpoles, frogs, worms, leeches, crayfish, large insects, mollusks, annelids, salamanders, other snakes, turtles, small birds, and mammals. At night, it concentrates on minnows and other small fish resting in shallow water. It hunts using smell and sight. The Lake Erie watersnake subspecies, N. s. insularum, was once endangered, but now benefits from the introduction of the round goby, an invasive species, which constitutes up to 90% of its diet.

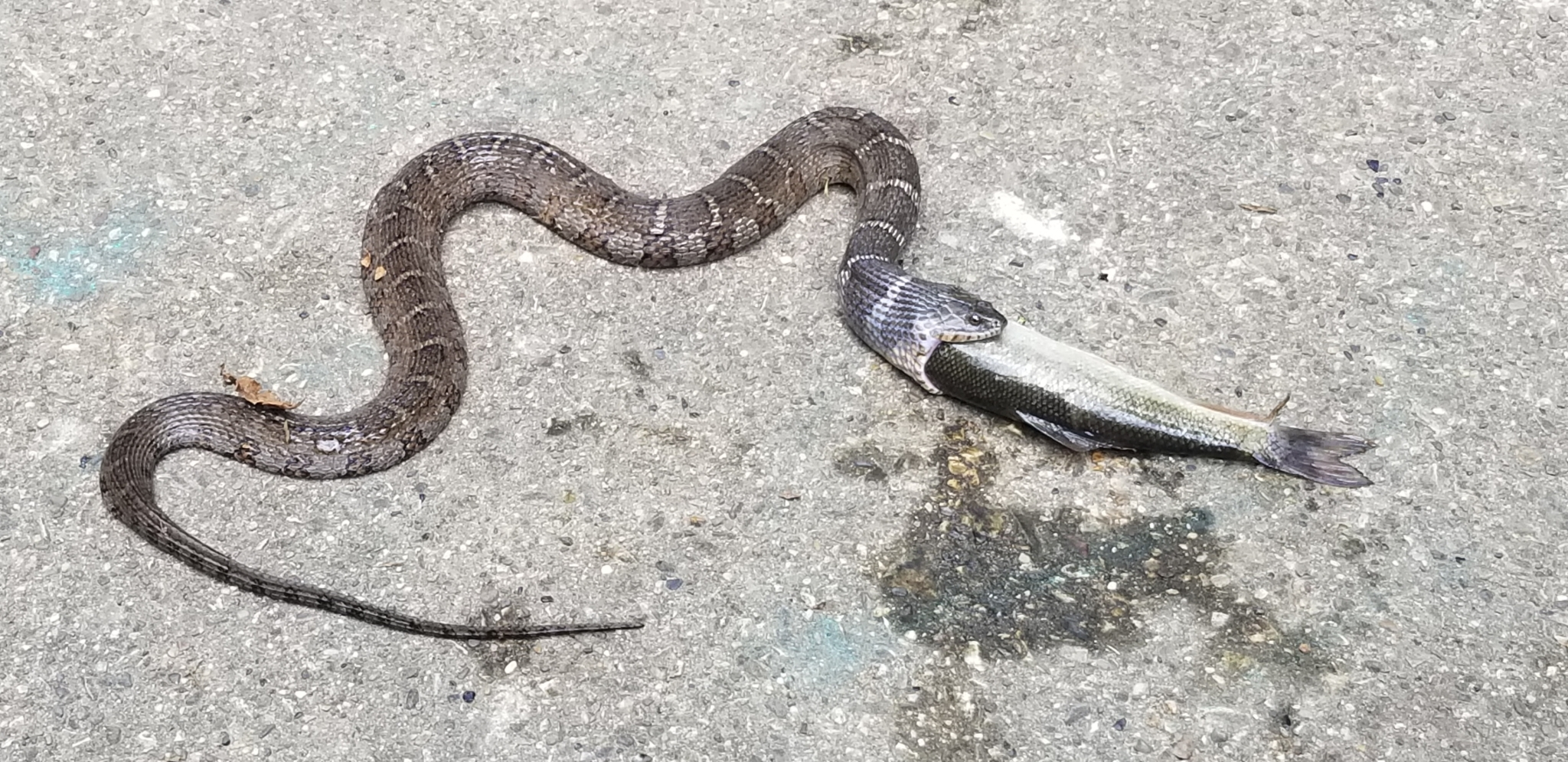
N. s. sipedon eating fish

The common watersnake is common over most of its range and is frequently seen basking on stream banks, from which it dives into the water at the slightest disturbance. "Water snakes are highly aquatic, spending nearly all their time either on the surface of the water or on substrate just above or beside the water". It is quick to flee from danger, but if cornered or captured, it usually does not hesitate to defend itself. Larger specimens can inflict a painful bite.

Female movement during the mating period was directly and positively related to male mate location success and this effect was intensified when females were freshly-shed.

== Reproduction ==
The common watersnake mates from April through June. It is ovoviviparous (live-bearing), which means it does not lay eggs like many other snakes. Instead, the mother carries the eggs inside her body and gives birth to free-living young, each one 19–23 cm (7 1/2–9 in) long. A female may have as many as 30 young at a time, but the average is eight. They are born between August and October. Mothers do not care for their young. Females are known to be larger in both length and mass when compared to males. Multiple mating by females is common, leading to a focus in sperm competition. Research suggests successful males are not the ones who dedicate more energy to size, but to sperm. Males typically reach sexual maturity during their second year, generally around 21 months. Northern water snakes can perform vitellogenesis, which is when they create extra yolk protein for the young, and since this costs a lot of energy they have to store up a lot of fat.

Rarely, and observed only in captivity, the northern watersnake can reproduce by facultative parthenogenesis.

== Homeostasis ==
"Nerodia sipedon are effective thermoregulators".

== Defense against predators ==
N. sipedon has many predators, including birds, raccoons, opossums, foxes, snapping turtles, other snakes, and humans. The common watersnake defends itself vigorously when threatened. If picked up by an animal or person, it will bite repeatedly, and release excrement and musk. Its saliva contains a mild hemotoxic anticoagulant, which can cause the bite to bleed more, but poses little risk to humans.

When its tail is grabbed, it has been recorded twisting it off. The detached tail then continues to move for up to 30 minutes. Unlike many lizard species that can autotomize their tails, the tail does not regrow.

== Habitats ==
N. sipedon inhabits streams, lakes, and ponds, as well as wetlands. Juveniles typically inhabit lower-order streams adjacent to the larger-order waterways where adults are found. This helps juveniles to avoid predators such as fish, birds, and turtles present in large water bodies. They tend to select areas further away from the bank out in the open in dead cattail clumps or low hanging branches.

== Conservation status ==
The Lake Erie watersnake, which occurs mainly on the lake's western islands offshore from Ohio and Ontario, recovered to the point where on August 16, 2011, the U.S. Fish and Wildlife Service removed it from the Federal List of Endangered and Threatened Wildlife. The subspecies was first listed as threatened in 1999 after a decline due to eradication by humans, as well as habitat loss and degradation. When initially listed, the subspecies' population had dropped to only 1,500 adults. Endangered Species Act protections for the snake included designation of 120 ha (300 acres) of inland habitat and 18 km (11 mi) of shoreline for breeding grounds. Wetlands have been lost at an astounding rate over the years, and the reptiles within those wetlands have shown a decline as well. The introduction of an invasive species, the Eurasian round goby (Neogobius melanostomus) into Lake Erie in the mid-1990s became a new food source for the Lake Erie watersnake. By 2009, the population recovered to 11,980 snakes, safely exceeding the population minimum goal of 5,555 adult snakes required by the 2003 recovery plan. Monitoring was to occur for 5 years following this delisting. The Lake Erie watersnake is just the 23rd species or subspecies to be removed from the list due to recovery.

== Gallery ==
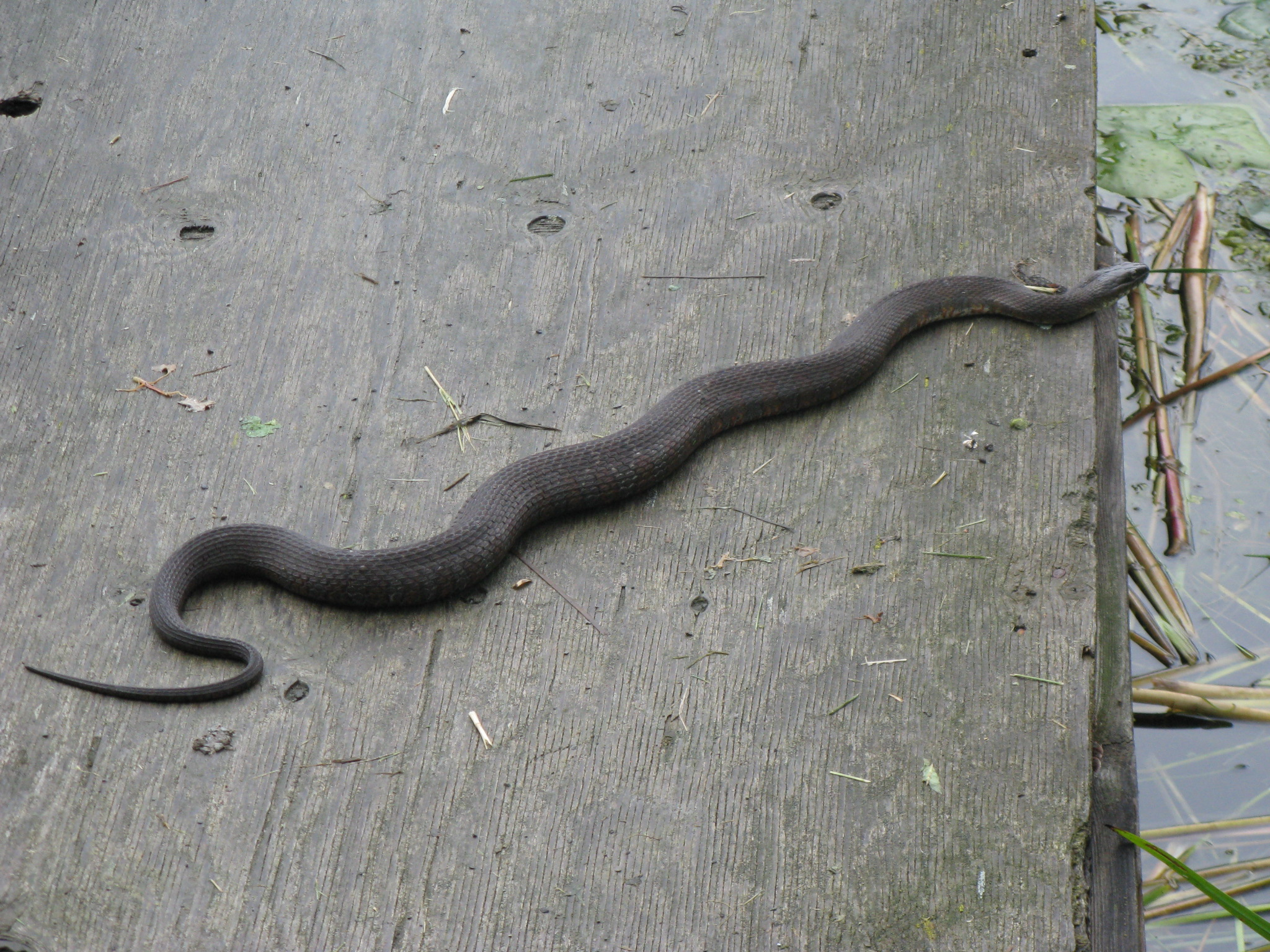
Mature northern watersnake sunning itself near Battersea, Ontario

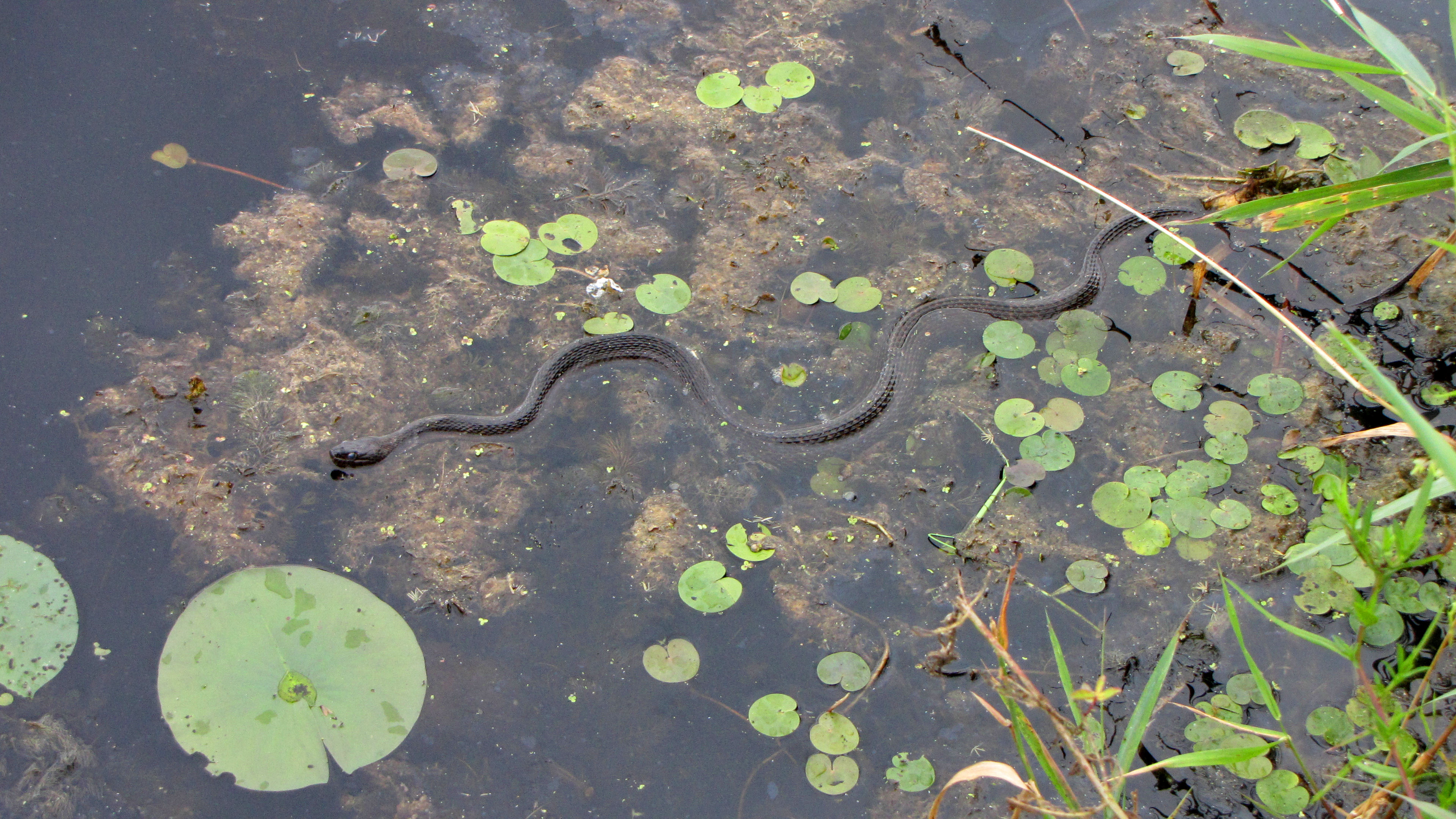
Preparing to moult, Prince Edward County, Ontario

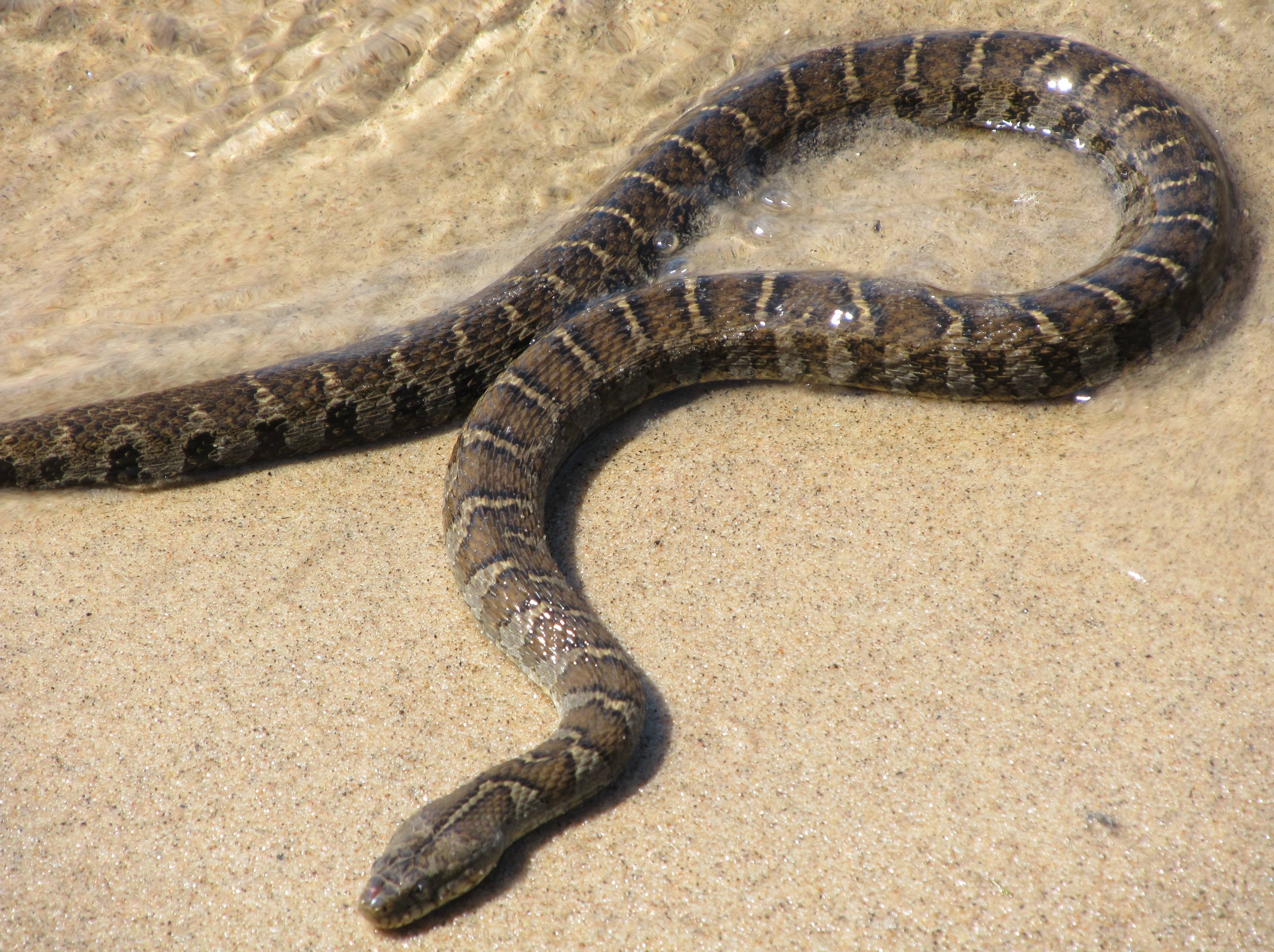
Hunting on a beach near Georgian Bay, Ontario

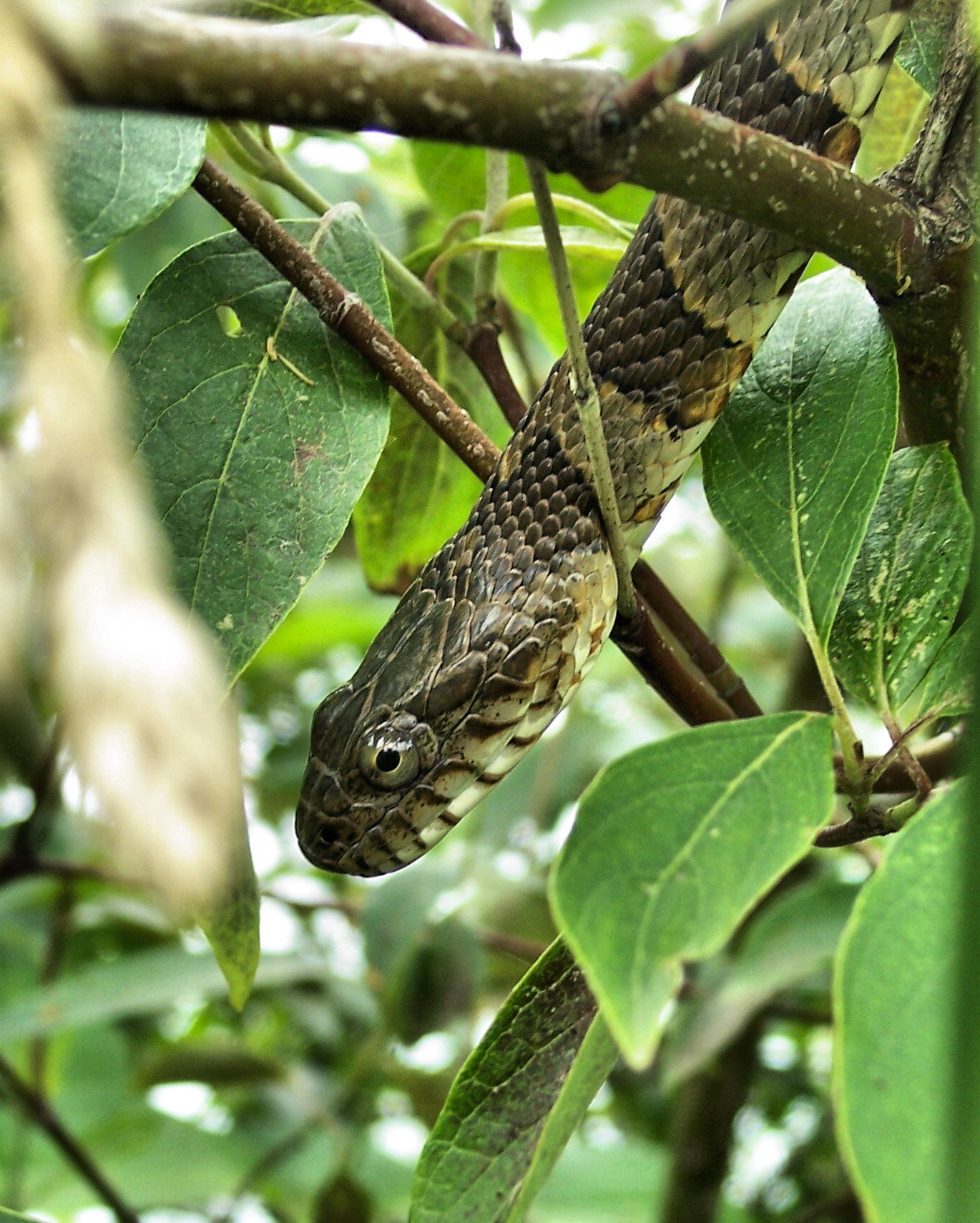
Close-up of the head

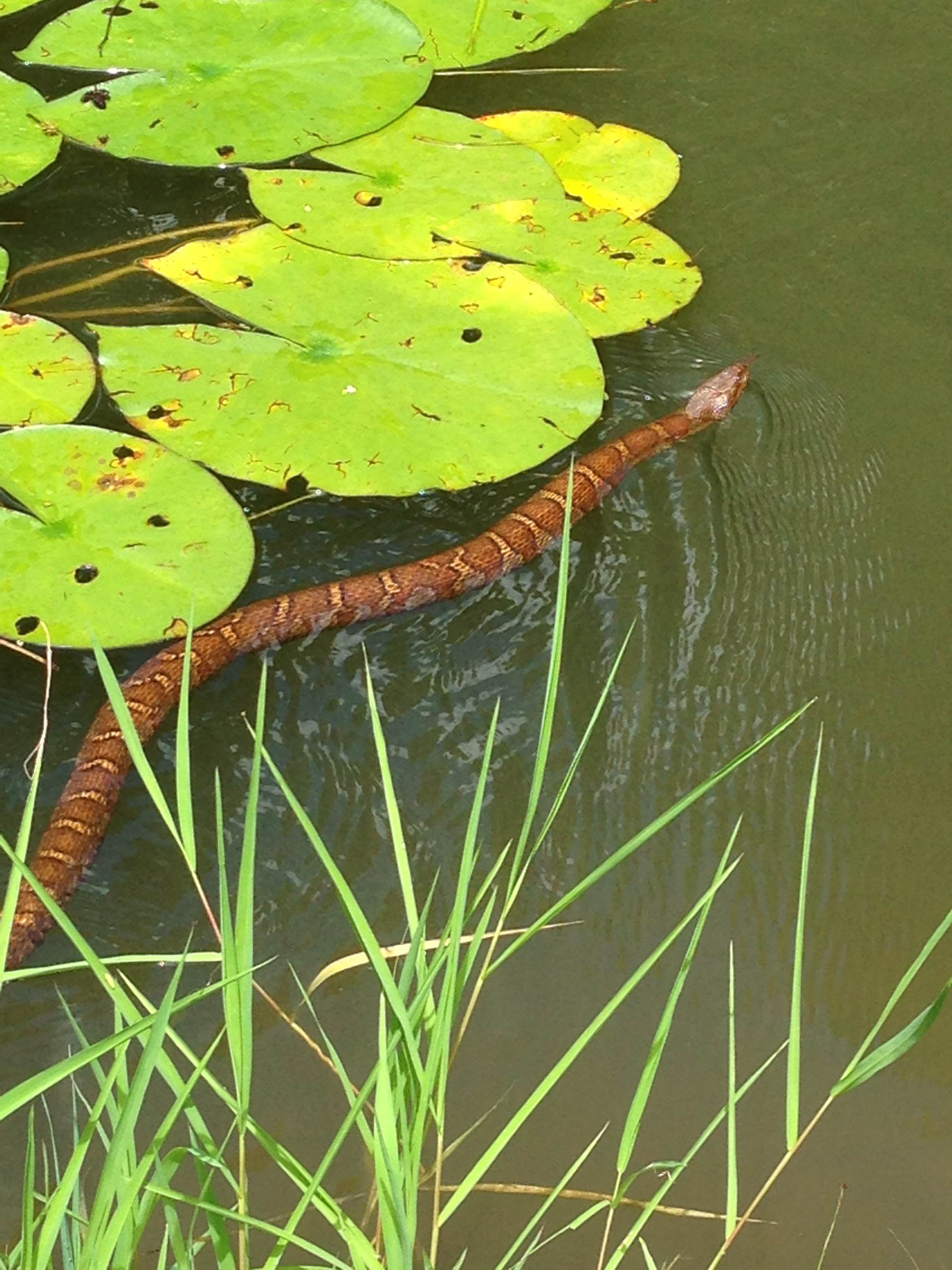
Northern watersnake swimming in pond Hayesville, North Carolina

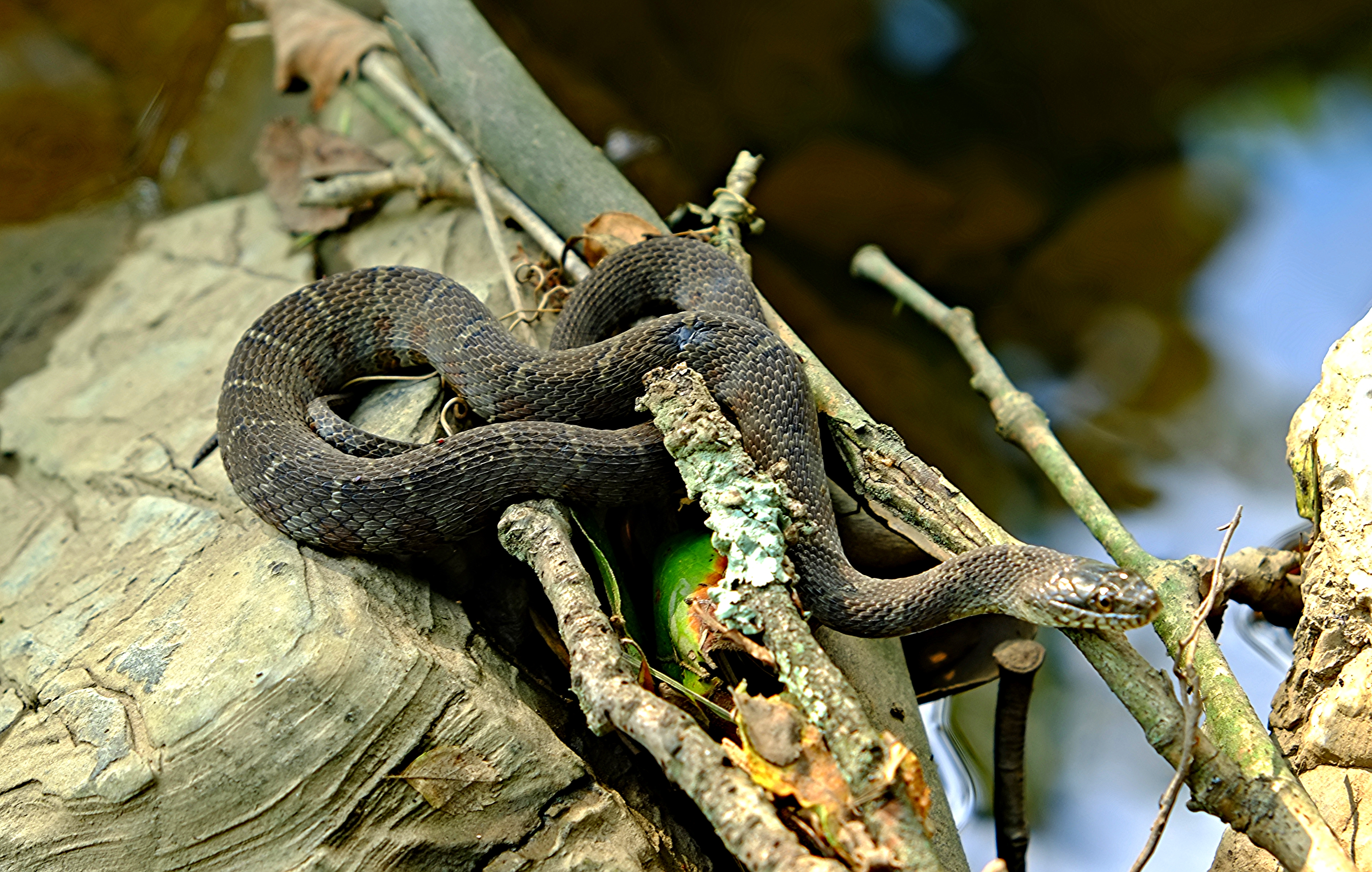
Basking in the sun along French Creek, Pennsylvania

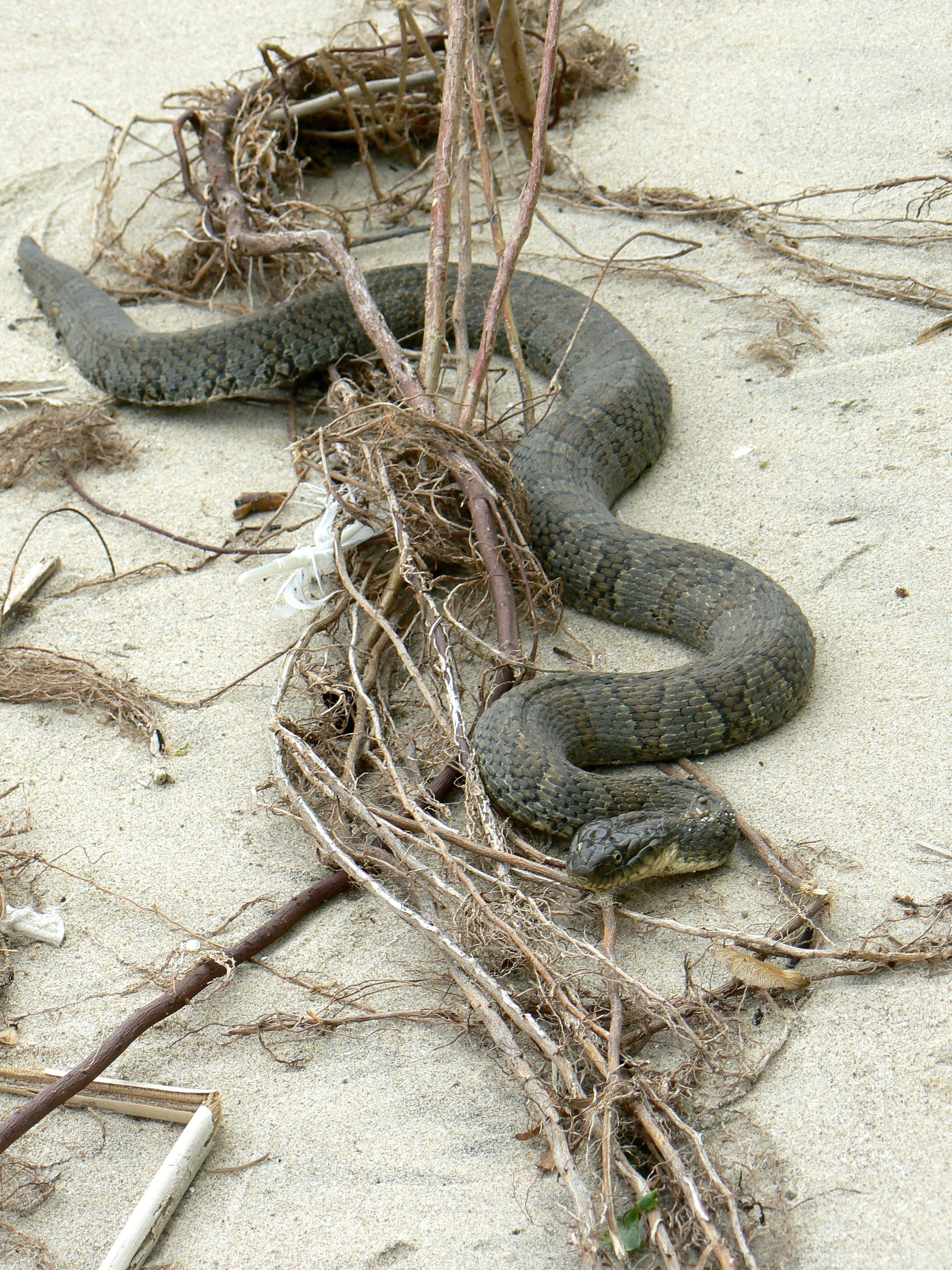
N. s. insularum on Kelleys Island
