= Chick Island =

Island within Lake Erie, Ontario, Canada

Coordinates: 41.7763°N 82.8142°W

Chick Island is a small, flat, treeless island in Ontario located within Lake Erie. Although it is called an island, it is actually a reef. It is one of the three "chickens" that surround Hen Island, the other two being Big Chicken Island and Little Chicken Island.
