= West Sister Island =

Island in Ohio, United States

West Sister Island National Wildlife Refuge
- IUCN category IV (habitat/species management area)
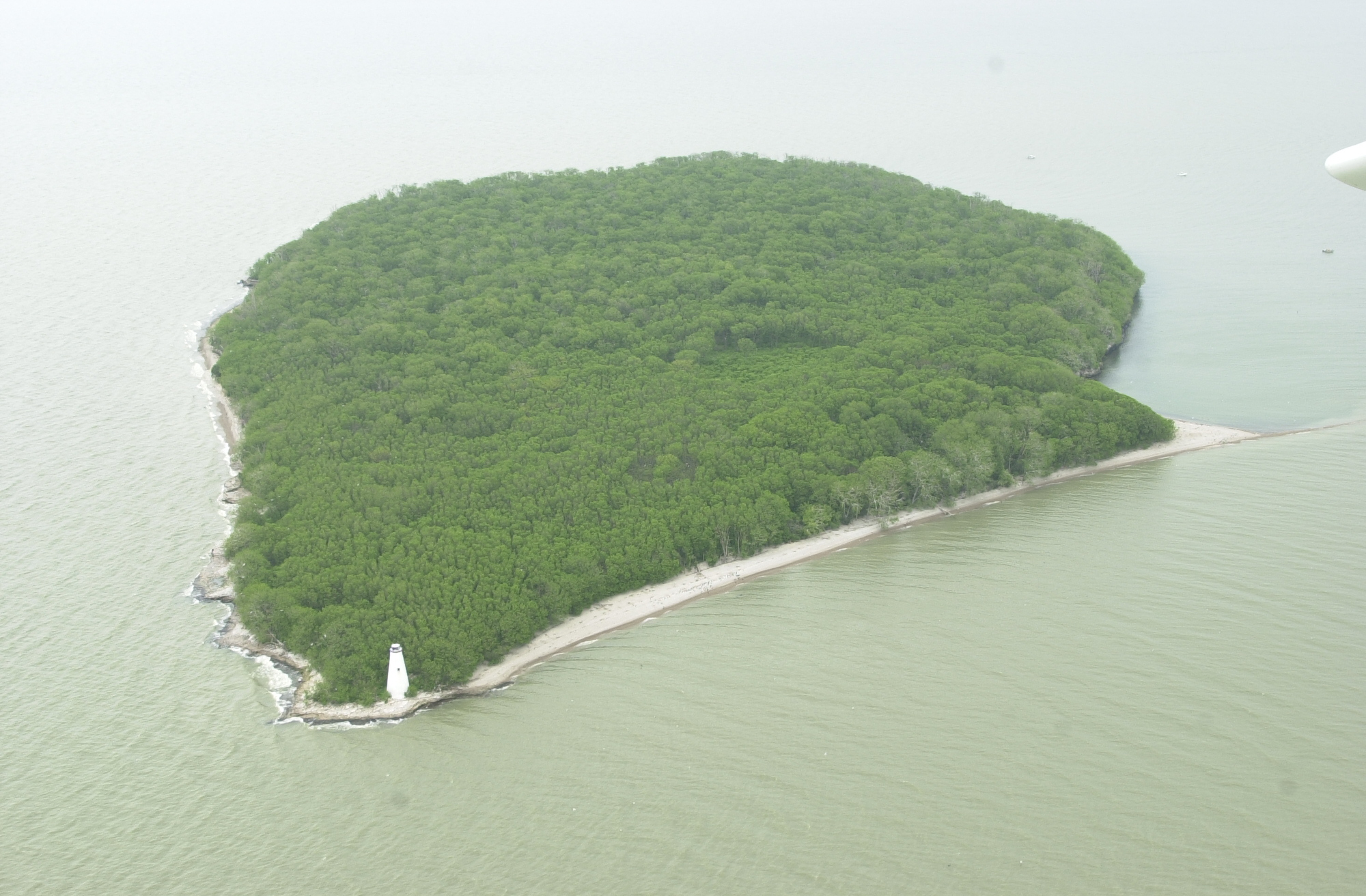
- West Sister Island in 2003

- Location within Ohio Location within the United States
- Location: Jerusalem Township, Lucas County, Ohio, United States
- Nearest city: Toledo, Ohio
- Coordinates: 41°44′23″N 83°6′19″W
- Area: 77 acres (31 ha)
- Established: 1937
- Governing body: U.S. Fish & Wildlife Service
- Website: West Sister Island National Wildlife Refuge

West Sister Island is an island of the U.S. state of Ohio located in the Western Basin of Lake Erie. The 82 acres (33 ha) island, jointly managed by the United States Coast Guard and the U.S. Fish and Wildlife Service, is Ohio's only designated Wilderness Area, the West Sister Island National Wildlife Refuge.

Most of the island is covered with trees. Tall hackberry trees make up most of the canopy, with poison ivy on the ground. Polygonatum and a great variety of ferns, wildflowers, mushrooms, and other plant life can also be found.

The island is part of the Pelee Archipelago which also includes East Sister Island and Middle Sister Island (both in Ontario, Canada). West Sister Island is roughly 13 miles west of Rattlesnake Island, 14.5 miles east of Turtle Island, and 8.75 miles due north of the Ohio mainland.

== Lighthouse ==
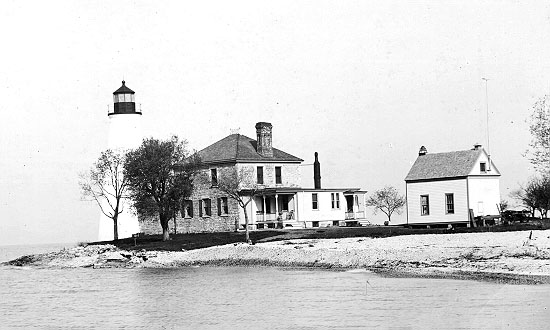
West Sister Light with Keeper's Dwelling

A lighthouse was established on the westernmost point of West Sister Island in 1848 to mark the west end of the South Passage through Lake Erie's Bass Islands. In the same year, a twenty-foot by thirty-foot brick keeper's dwelling was built near the base of the lighthouse tower. Standing on a stone foundation, the limestone and brick tower rises to a height of 55 feet (17 m). During the lighthouse's decades of operation, a number of structures were added to the island. These included a boathouse, a barn, chicken house, and a carpenter shop. In 1937, the lighthouse was automated and the keeper's dwelling was abandoned. The West Sister Island Lighthouse is still an active aid to navigation and is one of the oldest lighthouses to survive on the Great Lakes.

== History ==
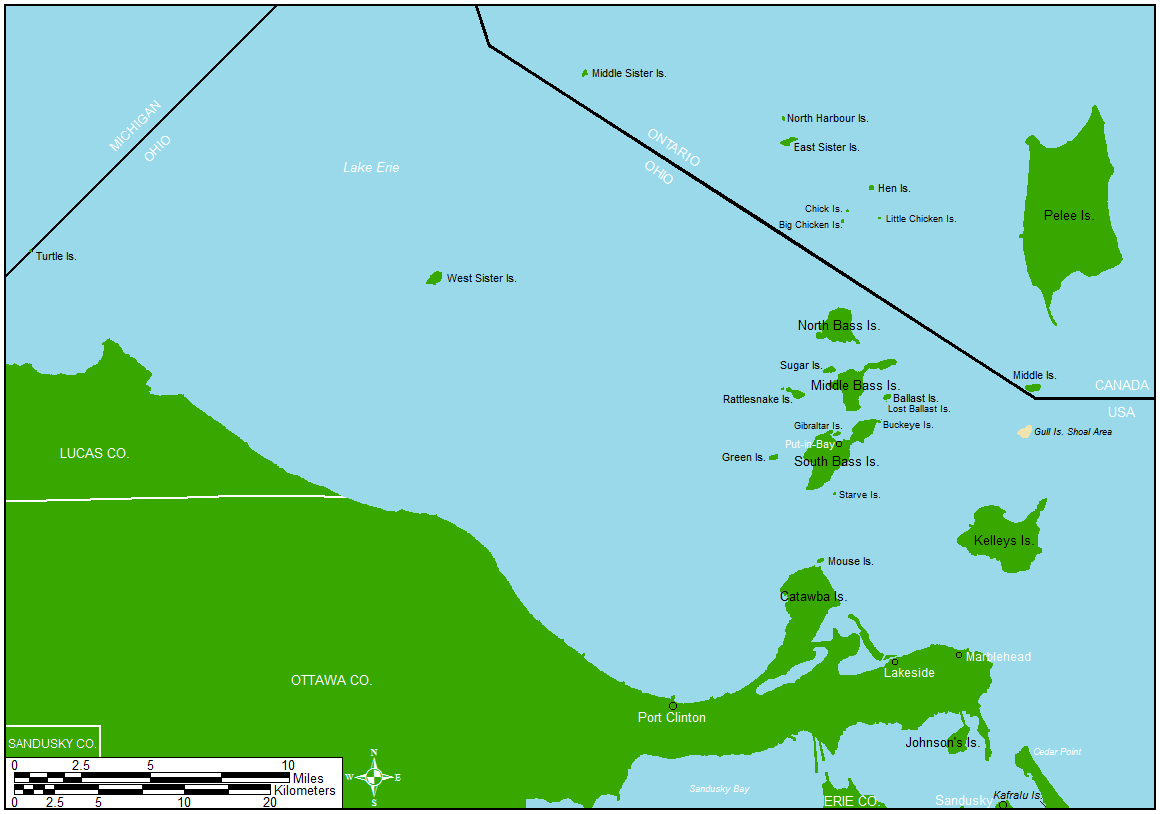
Map of the Lake Erie Islands.

Ironically, after being established as a wildlife refuge in 1937, the island was used by the United States Army for artillery practice during World War II. Although the wildlife population and the lighthouse were not significantly damaged, the keeper's house was destroyed. It is also reported that fuel tanks jettisoned by dive bombers can still be found on the island.

West Sister Island was a popular stop for bootleggers during Prohibition. The island provided a certain level of visual cover from the authorities for rum runners crossing the lake. When approached by these authorities, bootleggers would often dump their illegal stash overboard. Legend has it that bottles of prohibition-era alcohol can still be found on the bottom of the lake around the island.

West Sister Island was once rumored to be the final resting place of missing Teamsters boss Jimmy Hoffa. It was speculated that after his abduction in Detroit, he was brought by boat to the island and buried. The island's jungle-like environment would have made discovery of his remains difficult; however these conditions would also have made the deposit of his remains difficult, therefore the island is not one of the more widely considered possibilities in the case.

== Wildlife Refuge ==
The West Sister Island National Wildlife Refuge was established in 1937 by President Franklin D. Roosevelt "as a refuge and breeding ground for migratory birds and other wildlife...", specifically designated to protect the largest wading bird nesting colony on the U.S. Great Lakes. The refuge is managed by the staff of the Ottawa National Wildlife Refuge as a wilderness area, as provided under the Federal Wilderness Act. To protect it, public access is permitted for research only.

The refuge, which has a surface area of 80.13 acres (0.3243 km^{2}; 32.43 ha), was recognized in 2000 as part of a globally Important Bird Area.

West Sister Island provides nesting habitat for 40% of all the nesting herons and egrets in the U.S. Great Lakes.

== In popular culture ==
The wildlife refuge was featured in a 2007 episode of the Discovery Channel TV series Dirty Jobs with Mike Rowe. Due to the large number of birds vomiting and defecating from high in the trees the island is referred to as "Vomit Island" in the program.

In the animated television series Transformers Animated, the Dinobots reside in refuge on an island called "North Sister Island", located in Lake Erie, a fictional reference to West Sister Island.
