= Middle Sister Island =

- Interactive map of Middle Sister Island

Geography
- Location: Lake Erie
- Coordinates: 41.8487°N 83.0007°W
- Archipelago: Sister Islands
- Major islands: East Sister Island and West Sister Island
- Area: 9.5 acres (3.8 ha)
- Highest elevation: 571 ft (174 m)

Administration
- Canada
- Province: Ontario
- County: Essex
- Township: Pelee

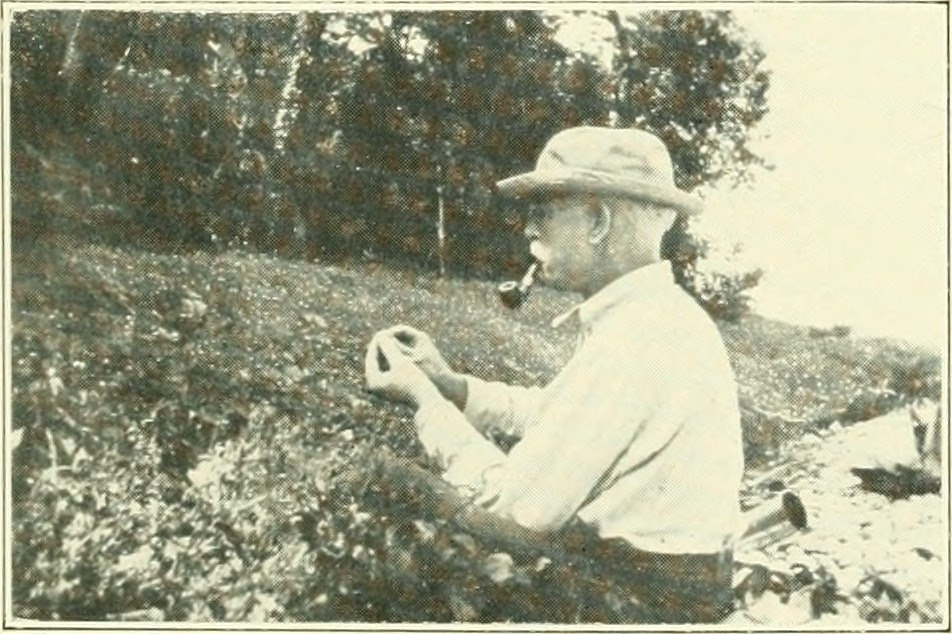
A man collecting shells on Middle Sister Island in 1915

Middle Sister Island is a 9.5-acre (3.8 ha) island in Lake Erie. Along with West Sister Island (in Ohio, USA) and East Sister Island, it is part of the Pelee Archipelago in the western basin of Lake Erie, and is considered to be the "most natural and undisturbed" of these islands.

== War of 1812 ==
The island was a staging area for William Henry Harrison's U.S. troops, just prior to the invasion of Canada and the Battle of the Thames.

== Flora and fauna ==
Guano from the Lake Erie population of double-crested cormorants is interfering with tree growth in the Carolinian forest on this island and the nearby East Sister Island and Middle Island.
