= Little Chicken Island =

Island in Ontario, Canada

Coordinates: 41.7723°N 82.7918°W

Little Chicken Island is a small, flat, treeless island in Ontario located within Lake Erie. Although it is called an island, it is actually a reef. It is one of the three "chickens" that surround Hen Island, the other two being Big Chicken Island and Chick Island.
