= Hen Island (Ontario) =

Island in Essex County, Ontario, Canada

- Interactive map of Hen Island

Geography
- Location: Lake Erie
- Coordinates: 41°47′18″N 82°47′51″W
- Archipelago: Pelee Island Archipelago
- Major islands: Pelee Island, East Sister Island and West Sister Island
- Highest elevation: 571 ft (174 m)

Administration
- Canada
- Province: Ontario
- County: Essex
- Township: Pelee

Hen Island is an island on Lake Erie in Ontario. There are three smaller islands, called "chickens," surrounding the island; their names are Big Chicken Island, Chick Island, and Little Chicken Island.

== Quinnebog Fishing Club ==
This small wooded Island is home to the Quinnebog Club, which owns the island. The club was founded in 1897, still exists and is active. The main clubhouse holds the dining hall and kitchen facilities as well as staff bedrooms on the second floor. According to the club's website the U.S. Presidents Grover Cleveland and William McKinley have visited the club to do some fishing.

The Club may have bought the island from either a certain "Colonel Blanchard", the first resident of the island, or Rudolph Siefield, an Ohio businessman.

Hen Island	Hen and Chicken Islands
