= East Sister Island (Ontario) =

Island in Ontario, Canada

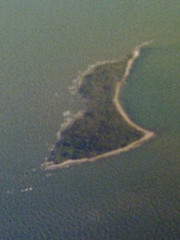
- East Sister Island
- Interactive map of East Sister Island

Geography
- Location: Lake Erie
- Coordinates: 41°48′47″N 82°51′23″W
- Archipelago: Sister Islands
- Major islands: East Sister Island and West Sister Island
- Area: 0.15 km^{2} (0.058 sq mi)
- Highest elevation: 571 ft (174 m)

Administration
- Canada
- Province: Ontario
- County: Essex
- Township: Pelee

Demographics
- Population: uninhabited nature reserve

East Sister Island is a 15 hectare island in Ontario, Canada, located within Lake Erie. It has no long-term human population and is maintained as a Provincial Nature Reserve.

The island is part of the Pelee Archipelago which also includes West Sister Island (in Ohio, USA) and Middle Sister Island.

== Flora and fauna ==
The island has become the home of a breeding colony of double-crested cormorants. Their droppings have threatened the forest, a relict of Carolinian forest in southern Ontario. The forests of the island are dominated by the common hackberry and Kentucky coffeetree. Unusual species on the island include the wild hyacinth and the Lake Erie water snake, Nerodia sipedon insularum.

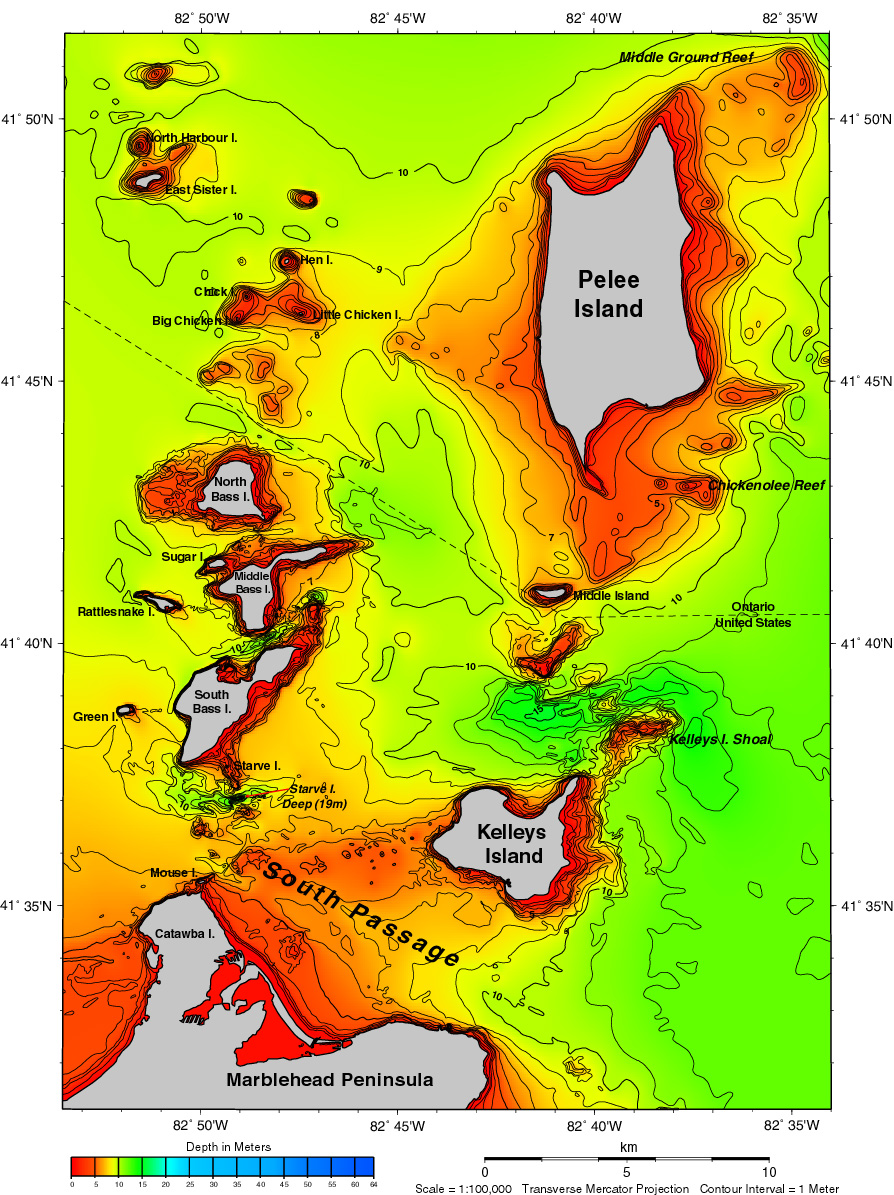
East Sister Island is in the northwest quadrant of this map.
