= Middle Island (Lake Erie) =

Island in Essex County, Ontario, Canada

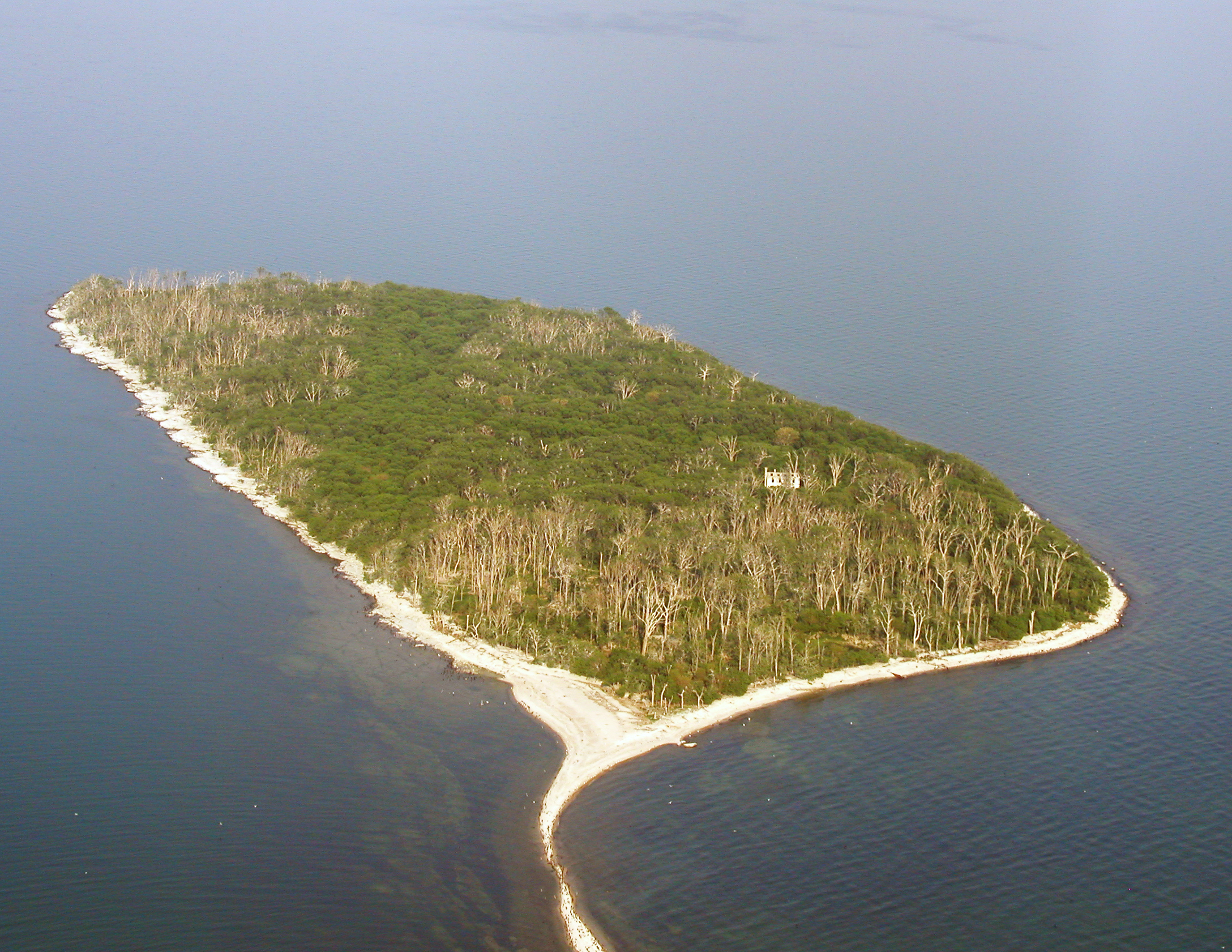
- oblique view of Middle Island looking approximately east-southeast

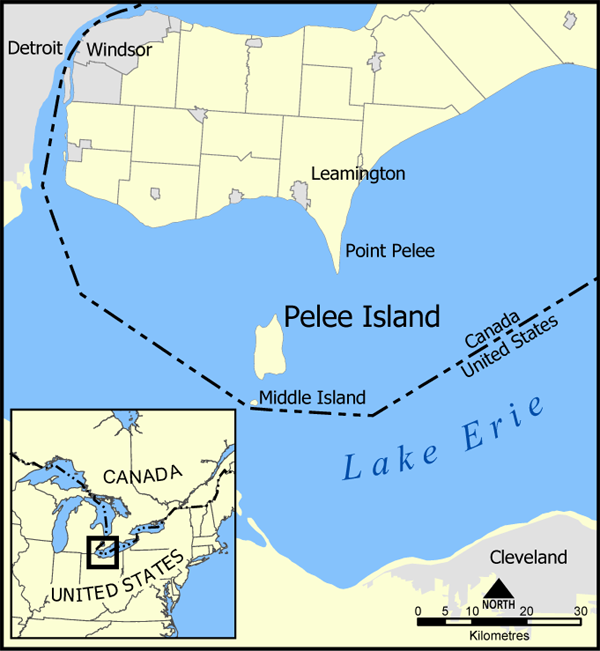
- Map of Pelee Island and Middle Island

- Location within Ontario Location within Canada

Geography
- Location: Lake Erie
- Coordinates: 41°40′58″N 82°40′58″W
- Archipelago: Pelee Island Archipelago
- Major islands: Pelee Island, East Sister Island and West Sister Island
- Area: 18.5 ha (46 acres)
- Highest elevation: 186 m (610 ft)

Administration
- Canada
- Province: Ontario
- County: Essex
- Township: Pelee

Demographics
- Population: 0

Middle Island is a small island, just 18.5 hectares (46 acres) in area. It is the southernmost point of land in Canada, at 41°41′N, 82°41′W (41.685, −82.684), or about 41.7 degrees north latitude. It lies in Lake Erie, just south of Pelee Island, and is part of Point Pelee National Park. It forms part of the province of Ontario. The southernmost part of the island lies some 150 metres (164 yards) from the U.S. maritime boundary. The distance to the northernmost point of land in Canada—Cape Columbia, Ellesmere Island—is 4,640 kilometres (2,883 miles).

There are no permanent settlements on Middle Island, as the entire island is a conservation area. The most common species are double-crested cormorants, though several others also nest there. The birds are so plentiful that in May 2008, Parks Canada began to cull the number of cormorants from more than 4,000 nests to between 400 and 800.

== Background ==
It once was the site of a lighthouse, built in 1872 but which fell into disuse by 1918. The 15-metre (49 ft) pyramidal square tower burned sometime afterward, but its stone foundation is visible. Located in Canadian waters, and hence indisputably under Canadian sovereignty, the island was privately owned for years by various U.S. owners. Subsequently, Middle Island was purchased in 1999 by the Nature Conservancy of Canada, and then donated to the Canadian national park system on September 6, 2000.

Archaeological evidence from a study done in 1982 suggests human occupation dating from 1000 to 1500 AD, with one site containing remains that may date to 500 BC. Others claim that the island has seen inhabitation for more than 10,000 years. Despite early rumours of burial mounds, none were found.

The island is part of an archipelago across western Lake Erie, providing a natural migratory corridor for birds and other animals. It has also seen human migrations, mainly from the U.S. northward in the 19th century, including escaped slaves, prisoners of war and army deserters from the U.S. Civil War seeking asylum in mainland Ontario.

Throughout the later decades of the 19th century, parts of Middle Island were used for growing grapes to be used in the production of wine, as was being done on Pelee Island.

During Prohibition, the island was a way station for alcohol en route to the United States on the south shore of Lake Erie. Gangster Joe Roscoe acquired part of the island and built a seven-bedroom "clubhouse" that became the centre of rum-running activity. The hotel offered electricity, fireplaces, and a large screened-in porch with views of the lake. The basement held a casino, carved out of solid bedrock.

In the years after 1933, after the ratification of the Twenty-first Amendment to the United States Constitution resulted in the repeal of the Volstead Act, the hotel drew as many as 200 visitors a day in peak season. Its kitchen became known for pheasant dinners.

Likely prior to the 1950s, there was an airstrip of about 275 metres (900 feet) in length. The runway began and ended in water, and is now choked with vegetation.

There was at one time a stately mansion on the island, rumoured to be a brothel some time after Prohibition. Only a remnant of the foundation remains.

When purchased in 1999 by the Nature Conservancy of Canada, the island had no physical improvements and had essentially become a nature preserve over the previous ten years, hosting the occasional scientific visit, and curious boaters. Although part of Point Pelee National Park, Middle Island is not officially open to visitors.

Interest in preserving the island prompted a 1982 study by Parks Canada, which recommended naming it a national natural landmark. Its ecological, historical, and aesthetic value led Essex County to include it on its list of Environmentally Sensitive Areas and an Area of Natural and Scientific Interest. A conservation group, Carolinian Canada Coalition, named Middle Island one of 38 critical unprotected sites in its effort to preserve remnants of Ontario's southern forests.
