= Karl Josef Kaiser =

Canadian winemaker (1941–2017)

Karl Josef Kaiser (1941 – November 22, 2017) was an Austrian-born Canadian winemaker, educator, and co-founder of Inniskillin Wines. In partnership with Donald Ziraldo, Kaiser played a central role in the development of the modern Canadian wine industry, particularly through the introduction of Vitis vinifera grape varieties in Ontario and the international recognition of Canadian Icewine. He was a graduate of Brock University and stayed closely associated by supporting wine education and research initiatives.

== Early life and education ==
Karl J. Kaiser was born in Austria in 1941 and immigrated to Canada in 1969 after meeting his wife Silvia in Vienna. He later settled in Ontario and studied chemistry at Brock University before becoming involved in the wine industry.

== Career ==
=== Inniskillin Wines and partnership with Donald Ziraldo ===
In the early 1970s, Karl J. Kaiser formed a professional partnership with Canadian wine entrepreneur Donald Ziraldo. Together they co-founded Inniskillin Wines in Niagara-on-the-Lake, Ontario. In 1975, Inniskillin became the first winery in Ontario to receive a post-Prohibition winery licence, a milestone widely regarded as a turning point for the development of modern winemaking in Canada.

Kaiser and Ziraldo were early proponents of cultivating Vitis vinifera grape varieties in Ontario, despite widespread skepticism about whether premium wine grapes could succeed in the region’s cool climate. Their work helped demonstrate the potential of the Niagara Peninsula for quality wine production and contributed to the growth of the region as a major centre of Canadian winemaking.

=== Icewine and international recognition ===
Under Kaiser’s technical leadership, Inniskillin gained international recognition for its Icewine production. Kaiser produced his first Icewine in 1984 using Vidal grapes frozen naturally on the vine, introducing the German Eiswein method to Canadian winemaking.

Inniskillin achieved global attention in 1991 when its 1989 Vidal Icewine won the Grand Prix d’Honneur at Vinexpo in Bordeaux, France. Kaiser receiving this award was regarded as a defining moment for not only his career but for Canada's emerging wine industry, bringing international recognition to both Inniskillin and Canadian Icewine production.

=== Riedel Icewine glass ===
Kaiser was involved in the development of a glass designed specifically for Icewine. In 1999, he participated alongside Donald Ziraldo and Austrian glassmaker Georg Riedel in a tasting workshop in Toronto to determine the optimal shape for an Icewine glass. The project resulted in the Riedel Vinum Extreme Icewine glass, which was introduced in 2000.

=== Brock University and wine education ===
After graduating from Brock University in 1974, Kaiser remained closely connected to the institution throughout his career. He supported the development of wine education and research initiatives in the Niagara region and remained involved with the university’s wine-related programs. His work emphasized mentorship and the integration of academic research into the Canadian wine industry.

Kaiser also participated in industry initiatives that contributed to the development of the Cool Climate Oenology and Viticulture Institute (CCOVI), established in 1996, and the Oenology and Viticulture (OEVI) undergraduate program introduced the following year. He later developed the OEVI wine chemistry course and served as its first instructor in 1998. Kaiser also became a CCOVI Professional Affiliate and returned regularly to Brock to deliver lectures and seminars.

== Awards and honours ==
Kaiser received several honours recognizing his contributions to the Canadian wine industry and wine education. He was appointed to the Order of Ontario in 1993 and received an honorary doctorate from Brock University in 1994.

He later received Brock University's Distinguished Alumni Award and the Ontario Wine Society Lifetime Achievement Award in 2005. Kaiser was also awarded the Queen Elizabeth II Golden Jubilee Medal in recognition of his contributions to Canadian viticulture and oenology.

== Personal life ==
Kaiser was married to Silvia Kaiser, whom he met before immigrating to Canada. The couple had three children: Magdalena, Andrea, and Maximilian.

Karl J. Kaiser died on November 22, 2017, at the age of 76, following complications from a stroke. His death was widely noted within the Canadian wine community, where he was remembered for his contributions to the development of the modern Canadian wine industry.
