= Alaska wine =

Wine made in the state of Alaska

Alaska
- Wine region
- Official name: State of Alaska
- Type: U.S. state
- Year established: 1959
- Country: United States
- Total area: 663,267 square miles (1,717,854 km^{2})
- No. of wineries: 4
- Wine produced: Merlot, Chardonnay, Cabernet Sauvignon, Pinot Noir and Riesling

Alaska wine refers to wine made in the state of Alaska. Alaskan wineries import juice from out of state to make Merlot, Chardonnay, Cabernet Sauvignon, Pinot Noir and Riesling. Some wineries produce wine made with fruits other than grapes. Alaska's signature wines are made from honey and native Alaskan fruit such as raspberry, blueberry, strawberry, salmonberry, gooseberry and rhubarb. Some wineries also produce ice wine. There are no designated American Viticultural Areas in the state.
