= Inniskillin =

Canadian winery

Coordinates: 43.2105°N 79.0641°W

Inniskillin Niagara
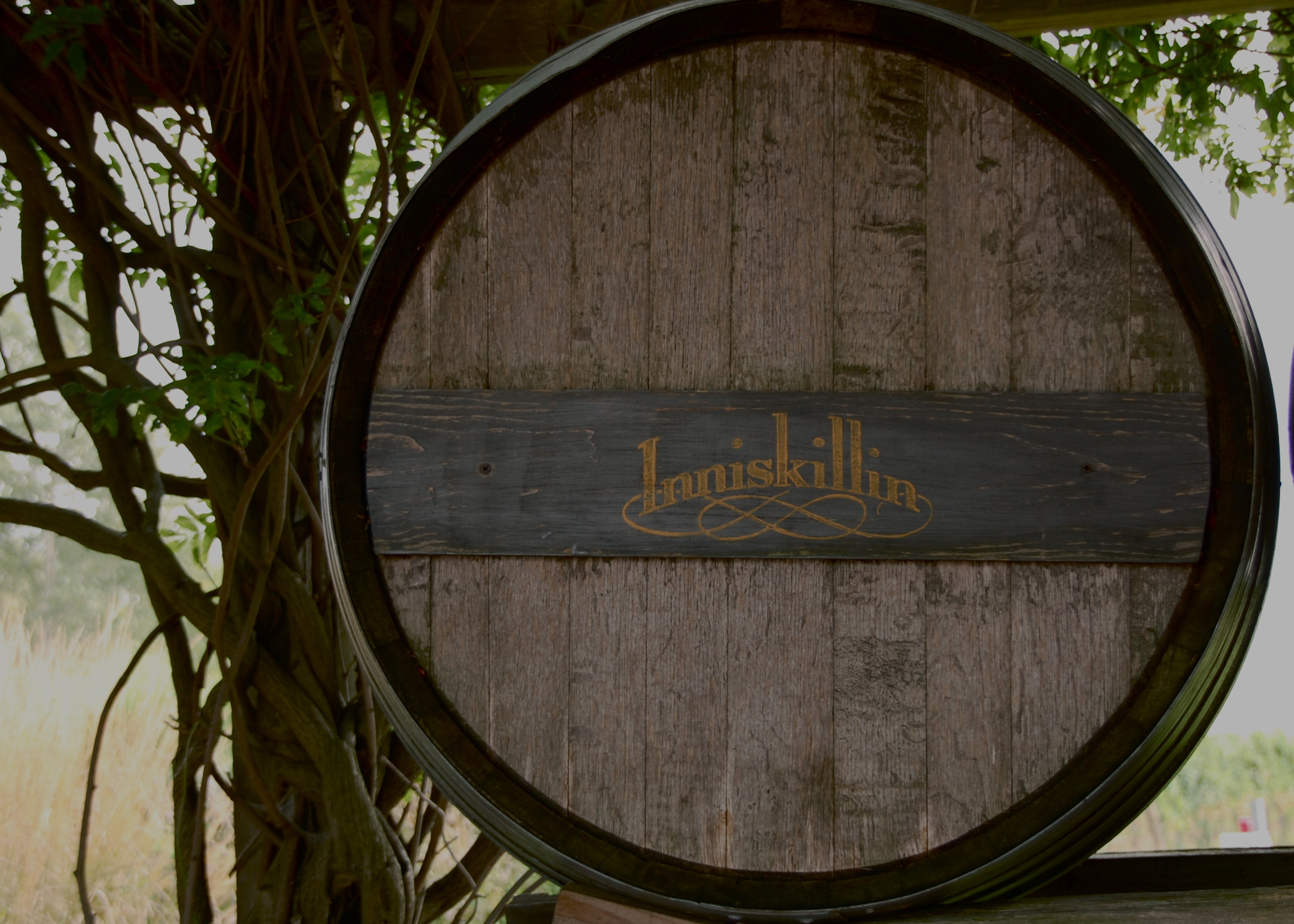
- Location: Niagara-on-the-Lake, Ontario, Canada
- Appellation: Niagara Peninsula
- Founded: 1974 (1975)
- First vintage: 1977
- Key people: Donald Ziraldo, Karl Kaiser
- Parent company: Arterra Wines Canada
- Known for: Icewine
- Varietals: Vidal (grape), Riesling, Cabernet Franc
- Website: http://www.inniskillin.com/

Inniskillin Okanagan
- Location: Okanagan, Canada
- Appellation: Okanagan Valley
- Founded: 1994

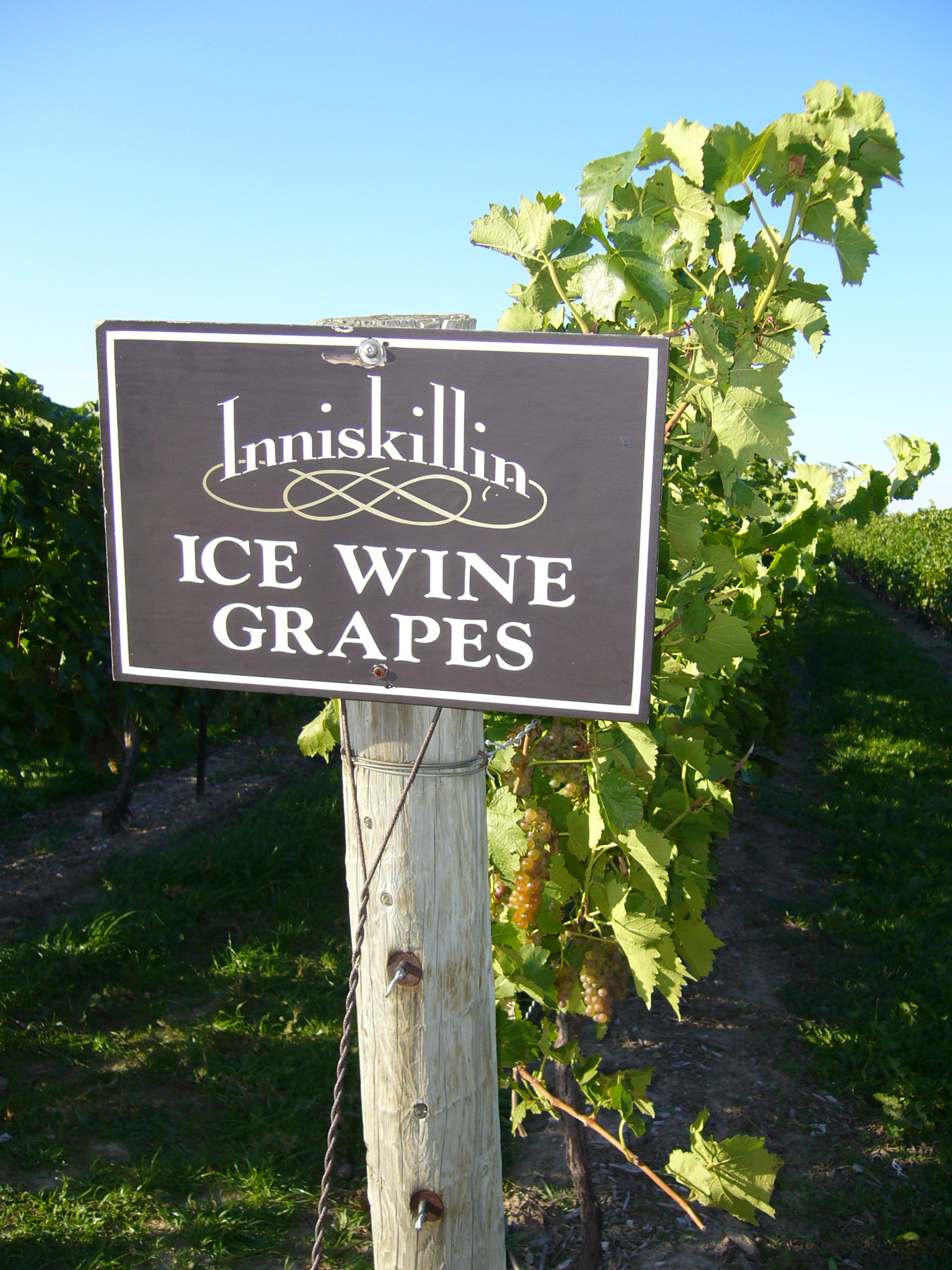

Inniskillin is a Canadian winery located in Niagara-on-the-Lake, Ontario. Inniskillin, which is mainly noted for its icewine production, has played an important pioneering role in the modern Canadian wine industry. Since 1994, Inniskillin also operates a winery in Okanagan, British Columbia (Inniskillin Okanagan) in addition to its original location (Inniskillin Niagara).

== History ==
Inniskillin was founded by Donald Ziraldo and Karl Kaiser and saw its beginnings in 1974. Before embarking on the Inniskillin project, Ziraldo was running a grapevine nursery and Karl Kaiser, a trained chemist, was a home winemaker. The first vines were planted in 1974, and since the duo had the ambition to make better-quality wines, their vineyard was planted with traditional European grape varieties, of the Vitis vinifera species, chosen from those cultivated in colder European regions. Their first vineyard, of 32 acres (13 ha) was planted with Riesling, Chardonnay and Gamay.

At that time the wine industry in the Niagara consisted of five bulk wineries growing American ("non-vinifera") vines, and no winery licenses had been issued since 1929. Inniskillin's license in 1975, which Ziraldo successfully lobbied for, was therefore the first post-prohibition license issued in the region. The company Inniskillin Wines was formally incorporated on July 31, 1975, and the first harvest occurred three years after their first vineyard was planted, in 1977. While waiting for their V. vinifera vines to yield grapes, they produced some wine from hybrid grapes. In 1978, Inniskillin moved to its present location on the Brae Burn Estate. An existing 1920s barn, thought to have been inspired by architect Frank Lloyd Wright, was restored for the winery's use, and has become something of a landmark.

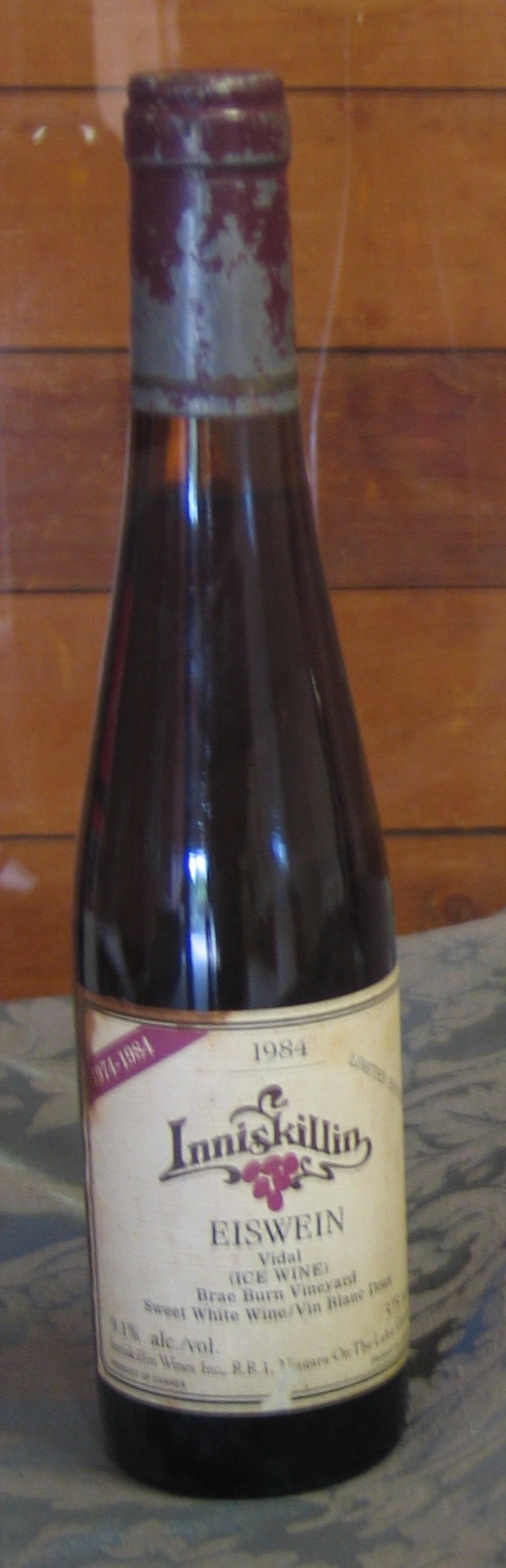
The first ice wine produced by Inniskillin, a 1984 Vidal, was in fact labelled "Eiswein".

The initial production consisted of white and red table wines, but another significant development started a few years later. In 1983, Karl Kaiser and three other Ontario wineries all left grapes on their vines in an attempt to produce ice wine, in order to put the harsh Canadian winter to good use. Inniskillin and their Niagara neighbour Ewald Reif lost their entire crop to hungry birds, while the two wineries Hillebrand and Pelee Island, situated in another part of Ontario, were able to harvest a minuscule amount of frozen grapes. In 1984, Kaiser used nets to protect Inniskillin's grapes and were able to produce the winery's first ice wine. This wine was made from Vidal grapes harvested at the Brae Burn Estate and was in fact labelled "Eiswein", the German and Austrian wine term. Thus, Inniskillin was one of the first Canadian wineries to produce ice wine, and the first to do so in commercially significant quantities. The international breakthrough of Canadian ice wine came in 1991, when Inniskillin's 1989 Vidal ice wine won the Grand Prix d’Honneur at Vinexpo.

The two founders of Inniskillin practised a division of labour. Kaiser handled the winemaking, and Ziraldo handled the marketing and was president of the company. Ziraldo was also instrumental in creating the Vintners Quality Alliance (VQA) and was the organisation's first chairman.

In 1992, Inniskillin Wines merged with Cartier wines (one of the old wineries of the region, founded in 1889) to form Cartier Inniskillin Vintners Inc. In 1993, Cartier Inniskillin Vintners Inc. merged with T.G. Bright & Co. Limited (founded in 1874 as the Niagara Falls Wine Company) under the name Vincor International Inc. Inniskillin wines continued as a subsidiary of Vincor, with the wines labelled as before and Ziraldo and Kaiser in their old roles.

In 1994, Inniskillin started activities at a subsidiary winery in Okanagan, British Columbia, under the name Inniskillin Okanagan. After that, the original winery was referred to as Inniskillin Niagara. This winery was started in collaboration with First Nation locals, the Okanaqueen Tribe of the Inkameep people, which kept vineyards on their land and supplied grapes to Inniskillin Okanagan. In 1996, Inniskillin expanded their Okanagan activities by buying an existing winery in Okanagan, Okanagan Vineyards, as well as the Dark Horse Vineyard.

In April 2006, Constellation Brands bought Inniskillin's parent company Vincor International Inc., which became Vincor Canada. Later that year Karl Kaiser went into retirement, but stayed on as a consultant for Inniskillin's ice wine activities, and Ziraldo left the winery and his position as president.

== Wines ==
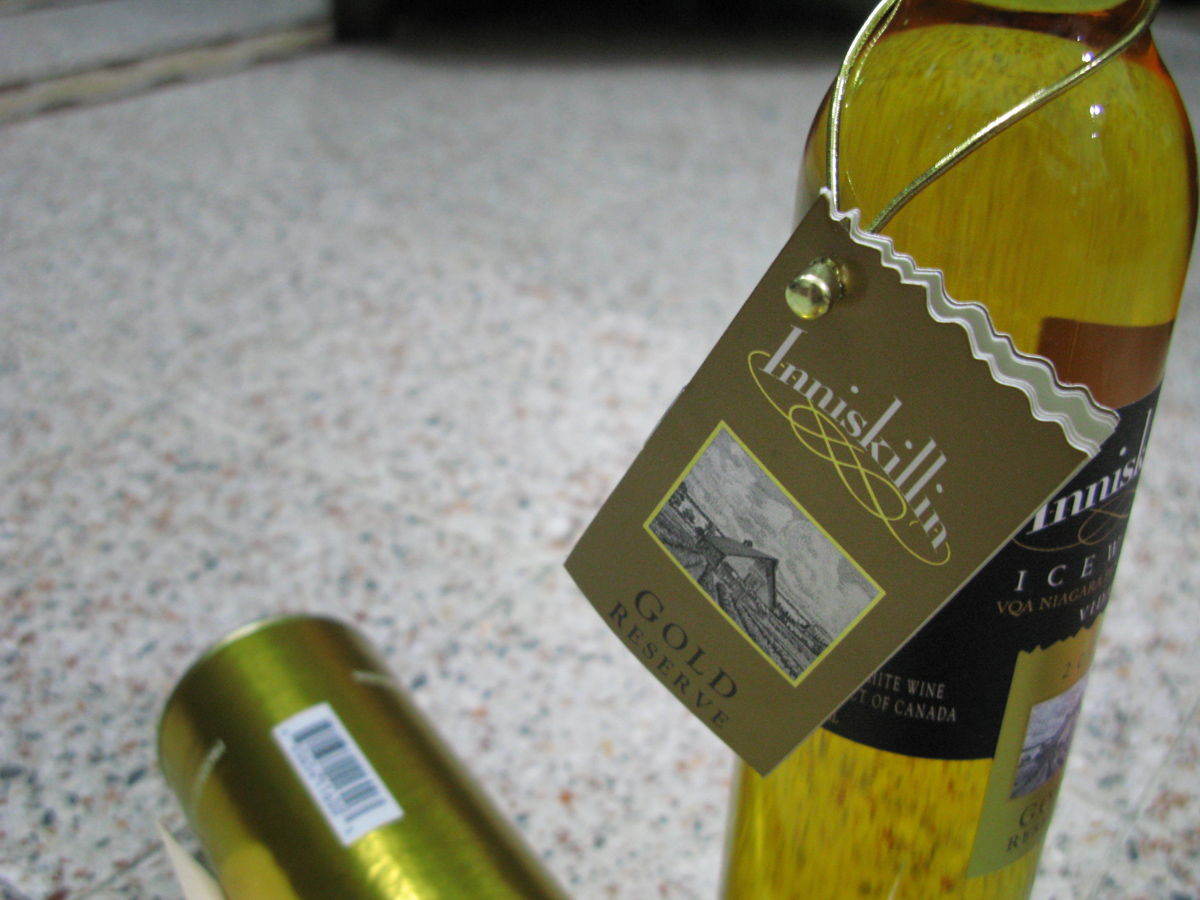
An oak-aged Vidal ice wine from Inniskillin.

The icewine production, accounting for approximately 10% of the winery's output, is commercially significant to Inniskillin. The parent company Vincor has singled out Inniskillin to be the group's primary icewine exporter, and Inniskillin icewines are therefore among the most distributed Canadian icewines in export markets such as United States, Japan and Europe.

All of Inniskillin's wines are VQA wines and most are varietal, and their range of table wines is marketed in five levels.

- Varietal Series (Niagara and Okanagan), several different varietal wines marked only with their region origin. Unoaked white wines and unoaked or lightly oaked red wines.
- Reserve Series (Niagara and Okanagan), varietal wines of more concentrated flavours from a narrower range of varieties. The Reserve Riesling is unoaked, while other white and all red wines see more oak than the wines in the Varietal Series.
- Discovery Series (Okanagan), varietal wines made from "odd" varieties not commonly cultivated in Okanagan Valley.
- Single Vineyard Series (Niagara and Okanagan), mostly varietal wines sourced from a single vineyard where the combination of vineyard and variety is considered favourable. As for the Reserve Series, Riesling wines are unoaked while other whites and all reds are oaked. Blended Meritage wines are produced in Okanagan.
- Founders' Series (Niagara), limited amounts of oaked Chardonnay and Pinot Noir wines.

== Vineyards ==
Inniskillin sources its grapes both from their own vineyards, and from some contracted neighbouring vineyards in the Niagara Peninsula. In Okanagan, grapes are also sourced from the vineyards kept by the Okanaqueen Tribe. The only non-vinifera grape grown is Vidal, used for icewine. The following vineyards are used:

Vineyard	VQA Appellation	VQA Sub-appellation	Size	Predominant grape varieties	Additional information
Brae Burn Estate	Niagara Peninsula	Niagara River		Pinot Noir, Riesling, Vidal	Owned. The site of the Inniskillin Niagara winery since 1978, includes vineyards dedicated to icewine production
Montague Estate	Niagara Peninsula	Four Mile Creek	100 acres (40 ha)	Chardonnay, Pinot Noir, Merlot, Pinot Gris, Riesling	Owned
Seeger Vineyard	Niagara Peninsula	Niagara River	120 acres (49 ha)	Chardonnay, Riesling, Pinot Noir, Cabernet Franc, Gamay, Vidal	Includes Inniskillin's original 1974 vineyard, which was sold to the Seeger family in 1977
Klose Vineyard	Niagara Peninsula	Niagara River	15 acres (6.1 ha)	Chardonnay, Cabernet Sauvignon	
Schuele Vineyard	Niagara Peninsula	Lincoln Lakeshore	170 acres (69 ha)	Chardonnay, Merlot, Pinot Noir, Riesling, Vidal	
Dark Horse Estate	Okanagan Valley		23 acres (9.3 ha)		Owned
Bull Pine Vineyard	Okanagan Valley				Owned
Discovery Vineyard	Okanagan Valley		3 hectares (7.4 acres)	Marsanne, Roussanne, Pinot Gris, Malbec, Zinfandel	Owned. Dedicated to varieties not common in Okanagan
(First nations land)	Okanagan Valley		265 hectares (650 acres)		
