= Donald Ziraldo =

Canadian winemaker and businessman

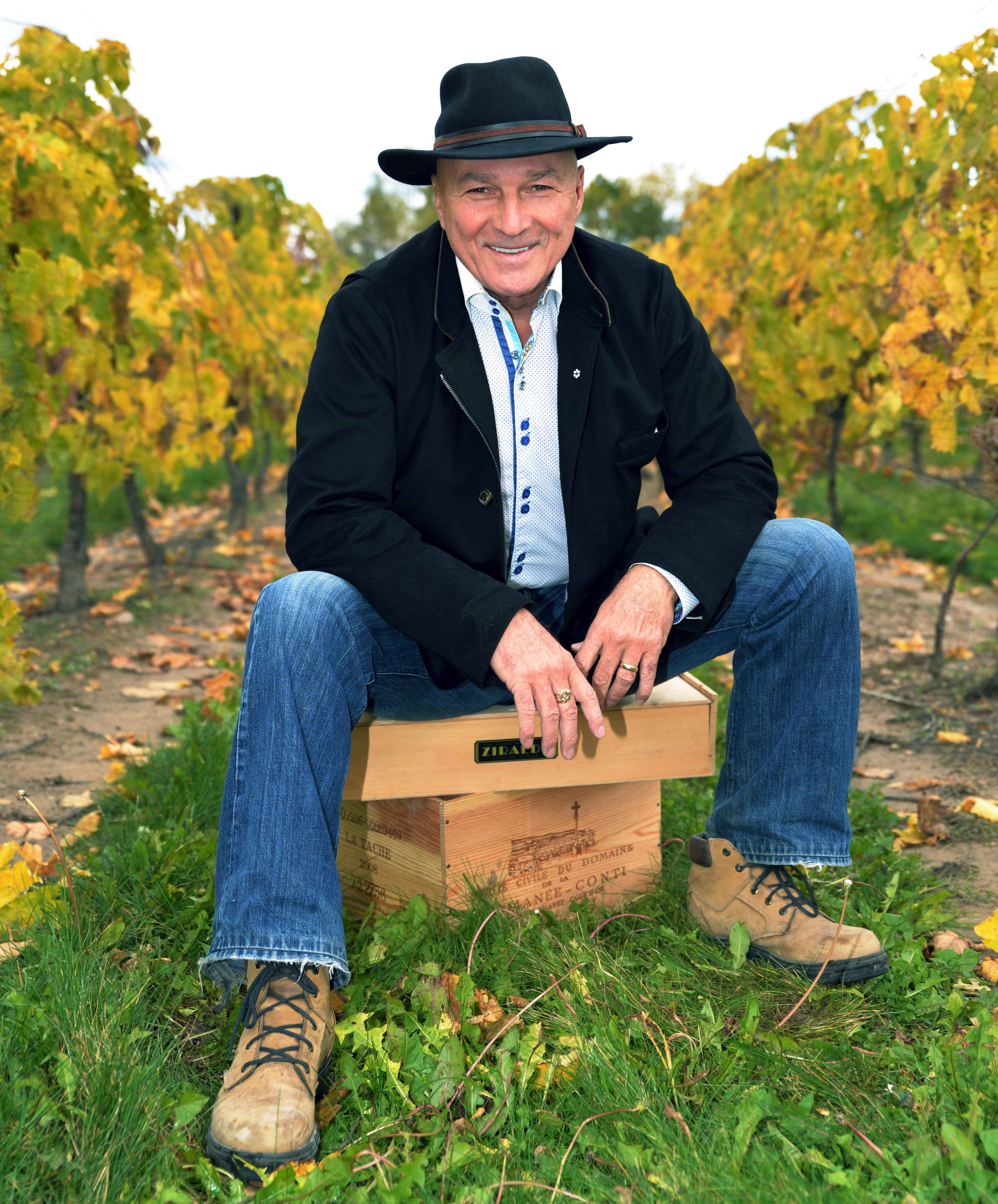
- Donald Ziraldo in Riesling Vineyard, Niagara-On-The-Lake
- Occupation: Vintner
- Known for: Inniskillin wines

Donald J.P. Ziraldo is a Canadian winemaker and businessman, and a Member of the Order of Canada. He and his partner Karl J. Kaiser have often been cited as two of the most important figures in Canadian wine history. He and Kaiser have been credited with starting the first winery in Canada since Prohibition as founders of Inniskillin Winery in Niagara, Canada.

== Inniskillin winery ==
In the spring of 1974, Ziraldo was determined to start a winery after he and Karl J. Kaiser, an Austrian-born wine-maker who had immigrated to Canada a few years earlier, found the wines in Ontario to be "undrinkable". Ziraldo got permission to obtain a winery license from Major-General George Kitching, who was the chairman of the Liquor Licensing Board of Ontario. Along with Kaiser, they worked together for 30 years to establish Inniskillin and put Canadian wines, which were virtually unknown at the time, on the world wine map.

Their most well-known accomplishment was winning the coveted Grand prix d'honneur at Vinexpo, France in 1989 for the Inniskillin Vidal icewine. Today, Canada is one of the world's largest producers of Icewine and sells a significant quantity to the Asian markets, largely due to the efforts of Ziraldo's marketing over the past 30 years.

== Varietal wines ==
While tasting Ontario wines in the early 1970s, Ziraldo and Kaiser discovered very little wine existed in the premium market segment in Canada. Seeing the opportunity, they set out to produce premium varietal wines from premium grapes grown in the Niagara Peninsula. In order to succeed, they used Vitis vinifera grapes, the family of grapes used to produce the fine wines in the established wine regions of the world.

When sourcing these limited grapes became a challenge in the early 1970s, Ziraldo and Kaiser planted vinifera grapes which included Riesling, Chardonnay and Gamay and formed the quality base for Kaiser to work with. Kaiser and Ziraldo's first attempts to make Icewine failed miserably due to a flock of hungry starlings devouring the grapes. Afterwards, they would cover the grapes with netting and use bird bangers to keep the starlings away from the tempting frozen grapes on the vines.

== Later years ==
In 2006, after Inniskillin was sold to Constellation Brands, Ziraldo left Inniskillin and in the years to follow started his own brand of Icewine and Riesling table wines under his name, "Ziraldo". In 2011, Ziraldo was asked to manage a Port winery in the Douro Valley, Portugal, under the brand Senhora Do Convento.

Ziraldo is the author of several books, including Icewine: Extreme Winemaking and Anatomy of a Winery.

== The Prosecco Project ==
In December 2023, Ziraldo launched his Prosecco wine made from single-vineyard in the ‘Al Canevon’ Estate in Conegliano Valdobbiadene which lies in hilly countryside situated 50 km from Venice and around 100 km from the Dolomites.

The vinification method is softly pressed and without skin contact. The Primary fermentation is from a static decantation followed by temperature-controlled fermentation. The Secondary fermentation last 30 days and the wine goes to refermentation in 25 or 50-hl pressure tanks charmat method.

== Honours and awards ==
In 1998, Ziraldo was invested as a Member of the Order of Canada, the highest tribute paid to its citizens, and he also received an honorary Doctorate of Laws (LL.D.) from Brock University. In 1999, the National Post Magazine chose Ziraldo as one of the top twenty-five Canadian CEOs of the century.

In 2008, Ziraldo was awarded the Premio Masi by his peers in Verona, Italy, and the Folio D’oro in Friuli, Italy in 2010. Ziraldo also received Canada's highest agricultural honour in 2013 when he was inducted into the Agriculture Hall of Fame.
