= Ice wine =

Dessert wine produced from frozen grapes

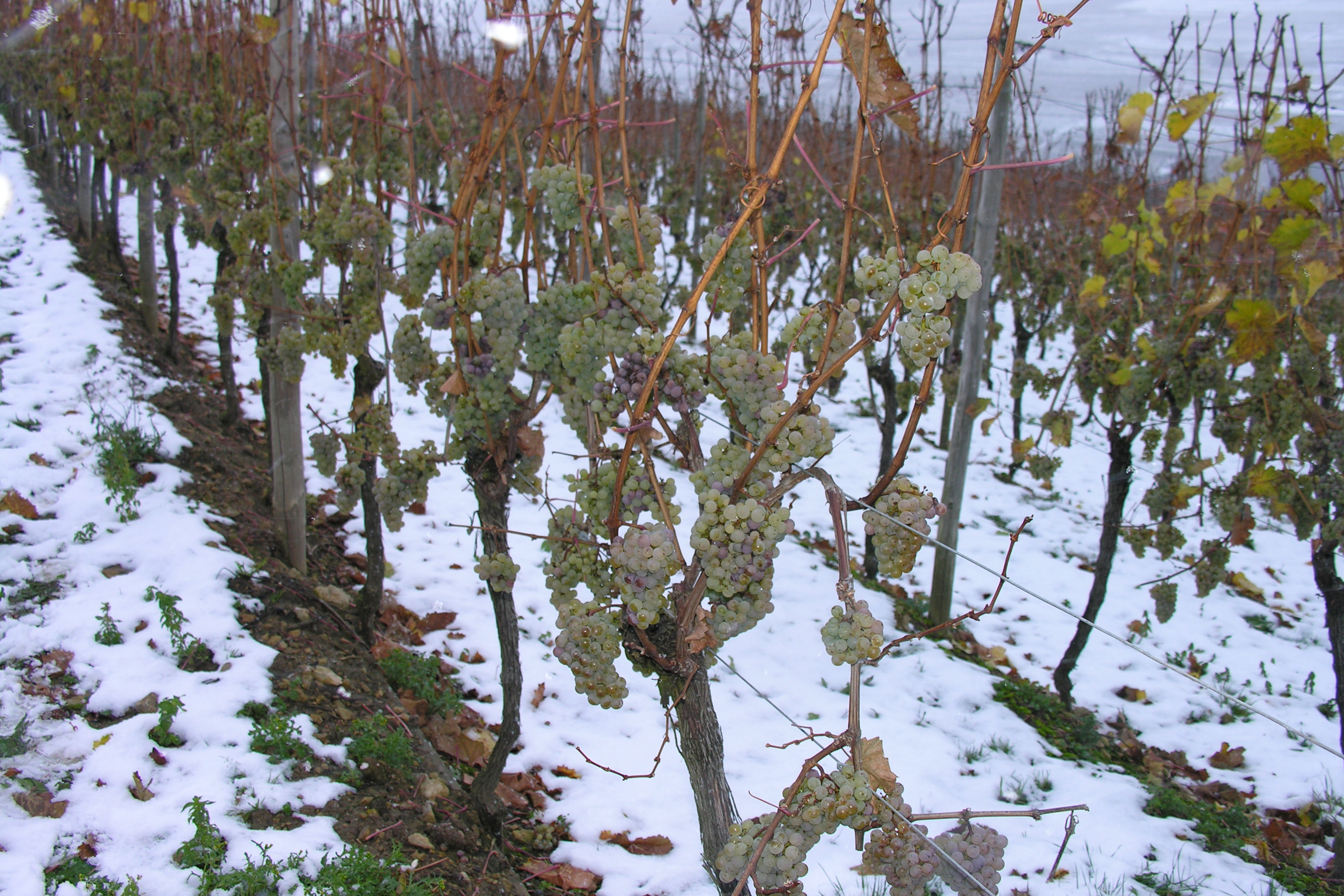
Grapevines in Luxembourg being grown for ice wine

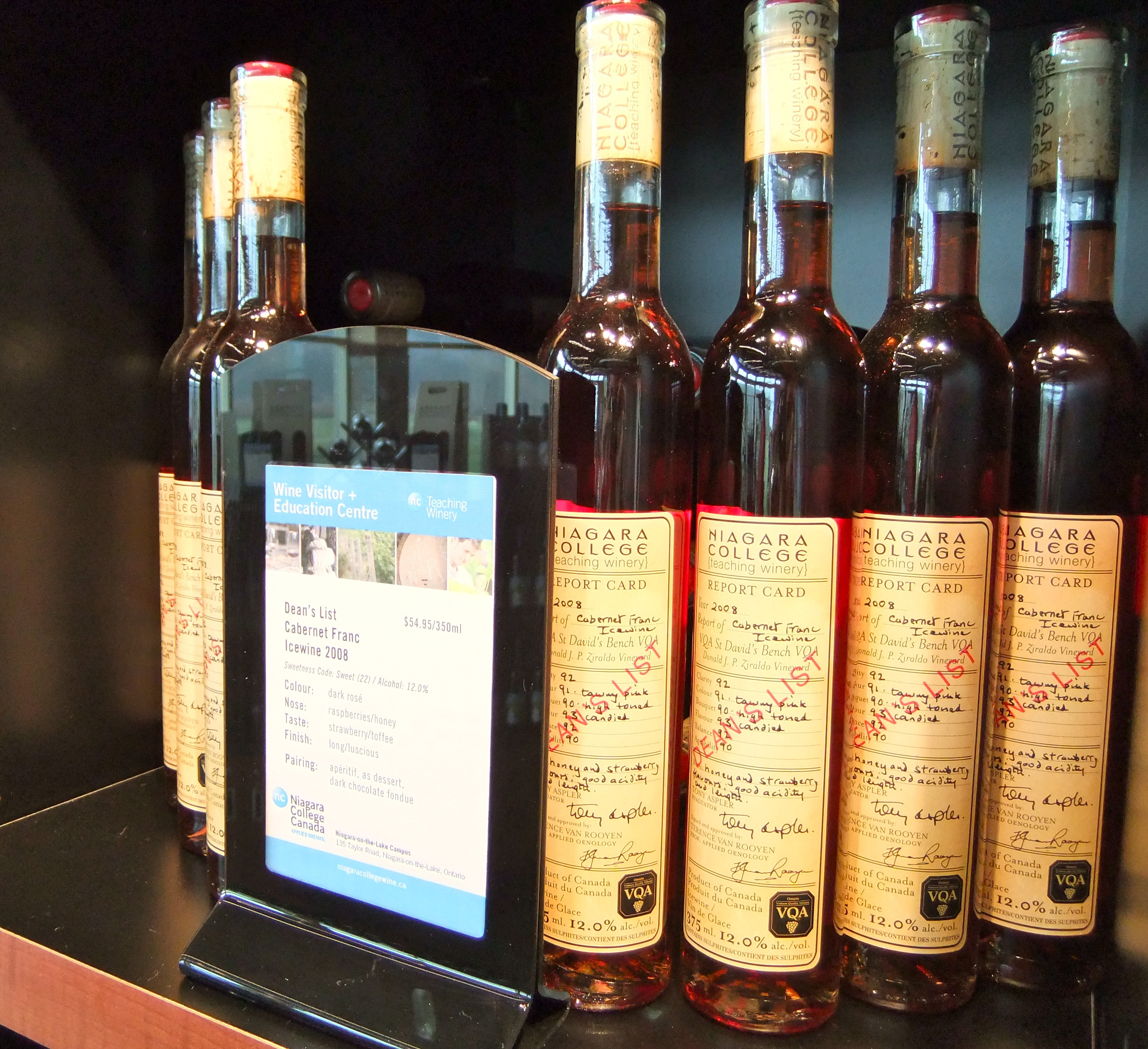
Ice wines produced from the Niagara College Teaching Winery

Ice wine (or icewine; German: Eiswein) is a type of dessert wine produced from grapes that have been frozen while still on the vine. The sugars and other dissolved solids do not freeze, but the water does, allowing for a more concentrated grape juice to develop. The grapes' must is then pressed from the frozen grapes, resulting in a smaller amount of more concentrated, very sweet juice. With ice wines, the freezing happens before the fermentation, not afterwards.

Unlike other dessert wines such as Sauternes, Tokaji, or Trockenbeerenauslese, which are made from grapes affected by Botrytis cinerea or noble rot, it is undesirable for grapes harvested for ice wine to be affected by noble rot. Only healthy grapes keep in good shape until the opportunity arises for an ice wine harvest, which in extreme cases can occur after the New Year, on a northern hemisphere calendar. This gives ice wine its characteristic refreshing sweetness balanced by high acidity. When the grapes are free of Botrytis, they are said to come in "clean". This results in a very complex and sweet wine. Much ice wine is made from the grapes Riesling, Vidal, Cabernet Franc and Cabernet Sauvignon, but there is also ice wine made from Shiraz, Merlot, Sangiovese and others.

Ice wine production is risky (the frost may not come at all before the grapes rot or are otherwise lost) and requires the availability of a large enough labour force to pick the whole crop within a few hours, at a moment's notice, on the first morning that is cold enough. The grapes for ice wine must only be harvested when they are frozen naturally and the temperature must be −8 °C (18 °F) or below when they are picked. This results in relatively small amounts of ice wine being made worldwide, making ice wines generally expensive.

Ice wine production is limited to that minority of the world's wine-growing regions where the necessary cold temperatures can be expected to be reached with some regularity. Canada is the world's largest producer of ice wine, producing a greater volume of ice wine than all other countries combined with Ontario producing over 90% of Canada's ice wine, followed by Germany.

== History ==
There are indications that frozen grapes were used to make wine in Roman times. Pliny the Elder (AD 23–79) wrote that certain grape varieties were not harvested before the first frost had occurred. The poet Martial recommended that grapes should be left on the vine until November or until they were stiff with frost. Details as to the winemaking and description of these wines are unknown. It cannot be completely ruled out that the descriptions refer to dried grape wines, a common style of wine in Roman times, where the raisin-like grapes were harvested late enough for the first frost to have fallen. In either case, the method seems later to have been forgotten. Wine from Chiomonte in the Val di Susa was popular in Roman times and this town still today produces one of Italy's few ice wines.

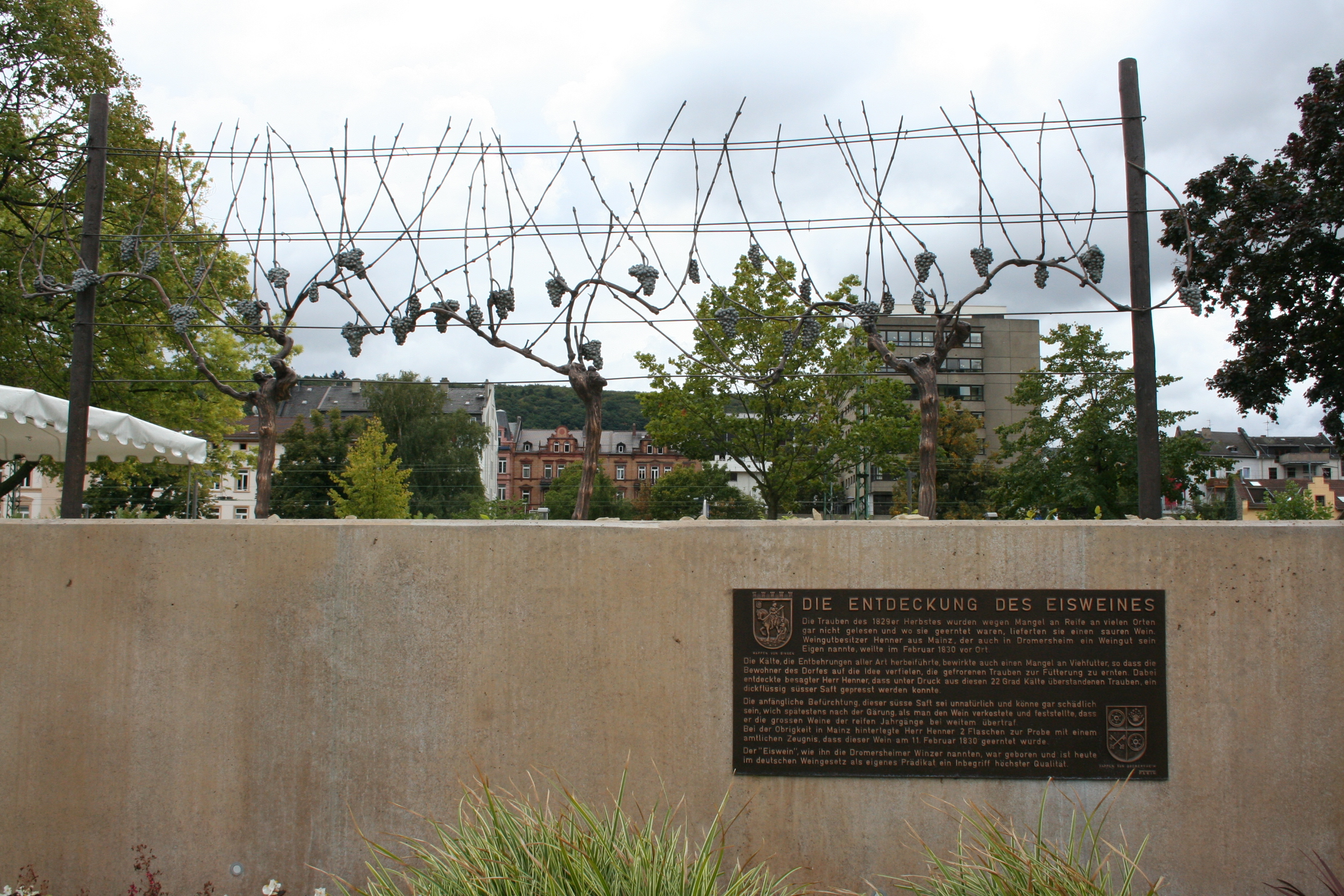
Monument commemorating the first harvest of ice wine in Bingen in 1830

It is believed that the first post-Roman ice wine was made in Franconia in 1794. Better documentation exists for an ice wine harvest in Dromersheim close to Bingen in Rheinhessen on February 11, 1830. The grapes were of the 1829 vintage. That winter was harsh and some wine growers had the idea to leave grapes hanging on the vine for use as animal fodder. When it was noticed that these grapes yielded very sweet must, they were pressed and an ice wine was produced. Sweet wines produced from late harvested grapes were well-established as the most valued German wine style by the early 19th century, following the discovery of Spätlese at Schloss Johannisberg in Rheingau in 1775, and the subsequent introduction of the Auslese designation. These wines would usually be produced from grapes affected by noble rot. Thus, Eiswein is a more recent German wine style than the botrytised wines.

=== Germany ===
Throughout the 19th century and until 1960, Eiswein harvests were a rare occurrence in Germany. Only six 19th-century vintages with Eiswein harvests have been documented, including 1858, the first Eiswein at Schloss Johannisberg. There was little effort to systematically produce these wines during this period, and their production was probably the rare result of freak weather conditions. It was the invention of the pneumatic bladder press which made the production of ice wine practical and led to a substantial increase in the frequency and quantity of production.

Production of a number of German icewines began to increase in 1961, and the wine increased in popularity in the following years. The production has been assisted by other technological inventions in the form of electric lighting driven by portable generators (to assist harvest in the cold hours of early-morning darkness, before sunrise and the grapes thaw), and remotely-controlled temperature alarms. After re-thawing, the grapes will spoil quickly since ice crystals destroy cell walls. Thus, the harvest must be completed within a few hours on the first morning that is cold enough. Plastic films are used for "packaging" the vines during the waiting period between ripeness and first frost to protect the ripe grapes from being eaten by wildlife.

=== Canada ===
Ice wine was first produced in the Okanagan Valley of British Columbia by German immigrant Walter Hainle in 1972. This ice wine was the result of an early and unexpected frost, and yielded 40 litres (8.8 imp gal; 11 US gal) of wine, which Hainle originally did not intend to sell, although he did so in 1978.

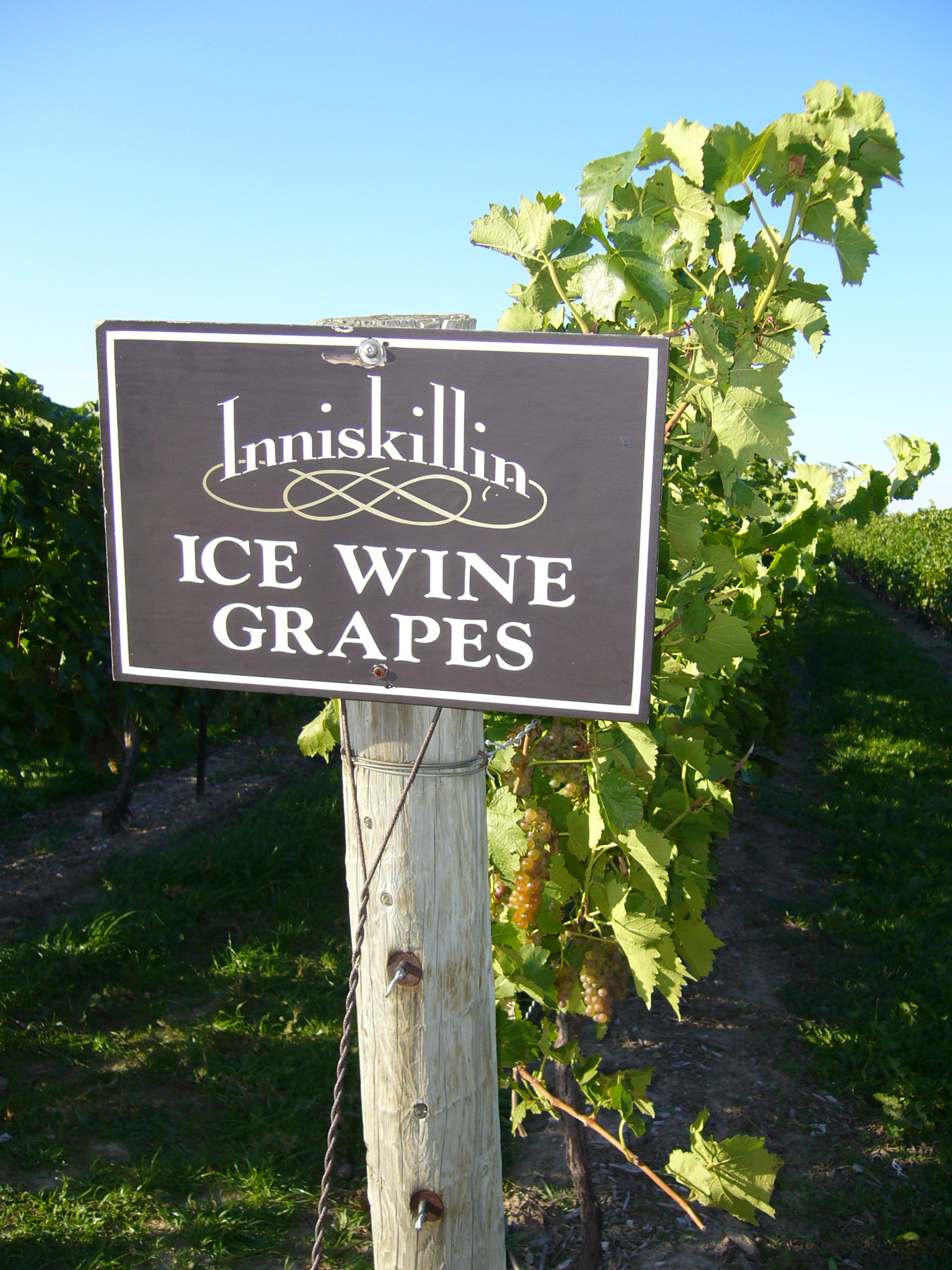
Ice wine grapevines at Inniskillin. The winery was the first in Canada to produce ice wine for commercial purposes in 1984.

In 1983, Niagara-based wineries Inniskillin's and Reif Estate Winery, as well as Hillebrand, and Pelee Island Winery, two wineries with Austrian winemakers situated in another part of Ontario, all left grapes on their vines in an attempt to produce icewine. Inniskillin and Reif lost their entire crop to hungry birds, while Hillebrand and Pelee Island were able to harvest a minuscule amount of frozen grapes. In 1984, Inniskillin winery was the first winery in Canada to produce icewine for commercial purposes, produced in 1984 under the direction of the winery's Austrian-born co-owner Karl Kaiser, often being mentioned as Canada's first icewine as they were "naturally frozen on the vine". Kaiser used nets to protect his vines and was able to produce Inniskillin's first icewine. This wine was made from Vidal grapes and was labelled "Eiswein".

After ice wine production established a commercial footing, Canadian ice wine quickly became popular with domestic consumers and reviewers. Other Canadian producers and regions picked up the idea since harsh Canadian winters lend themselves to large-scale production. The international breakthrough of Canadian ice wine came in 1991, when Inniskillin's 1989 Vidal ice wine won the Grand Prix d'Honneur at Vinexpo. The Canadian trend towards increased cultivation of Vitis vinifera (European) grape varieties in the 1990s expanded the palette of varieties available to be bitten by frost. By the early 2000s, Canada was established as the largest producer of icewine in the world. In 2001, the EU allowed the importation of Canadian ice wine, hence recognizing the standard equivalency.

== Ice wine producers ==
=== Canada ===
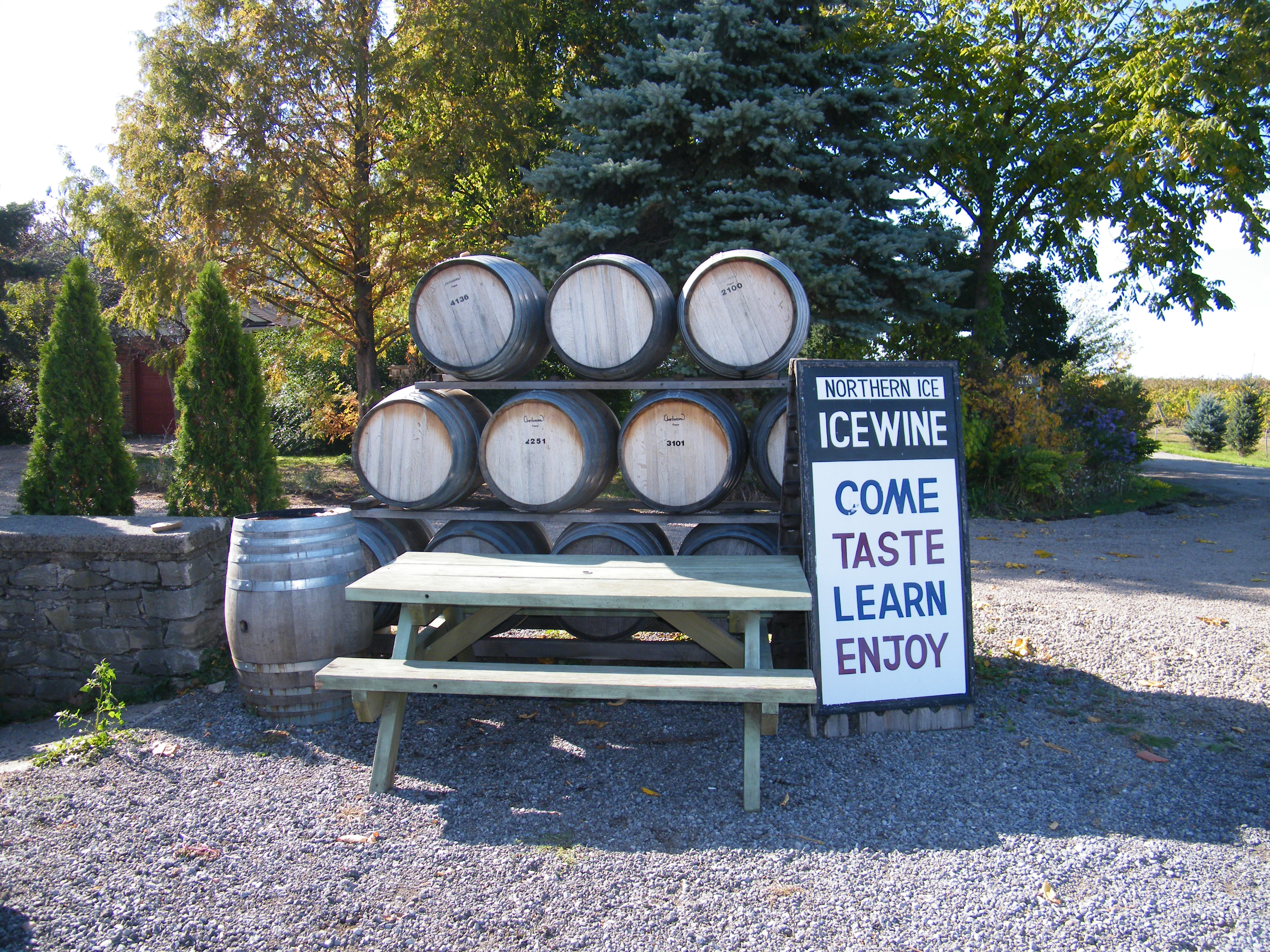
Casks of wine outside The Ice House Winery. The winery is one of many wineries in the Niagara Peninsula that produces ice wine.

In contrast to most other wine-producing regions, Canada, particularly the Niagara Peninsula, consistently undergoes freezing in winter and has become the world's largest icewine producer. As a result, Canada produces a greater volume of icewine than all other countries combined. Approximately 90 per cent of all icewine produced in Canada originate from Ontario-based wineries, with wineries in Ontario producing approximately 800,000 litres (210,000 US gal) of ice wine in 2016. However, it is also produced in all other wine growing provinces of Canada, including British Columbia, Quebec, and Nova Scotia. Icewine production is regulated by the VQA in the provinces of British Columbia and Ontario. If the sugar level in the grapes measures less than 35° Brix, then they may not be used for icewine, a minimum considerably higher than that of German Eiswein. These grapes are often downgraded to a lower designation, such as Special Select Late Harvest or Select Late Harvest. Canadian rules were further tightened in British Columbia in 2000 after a producer dealt with the mild winter of 1999 by moving grapes up to the mountains to seek freezing temperatures.

Though Pelee Island Winery and Hillebrand were Canada's first commercial icewine producers, starting production in 1983, Inniskillin Wines is considered the most widely known Canadian icewine producer as the first Canadian winery to win a major international award, the Grand Prix d’Honneur at 1991 Vinexpo in France, with their 1989 Vidal Icewine (which was technically an illegal import into the EU), placing Canadian icewines on the world stage. Pillitteri Estates Winery has emerged in the 2000s as the world's largest estate icewine producer. In November 2006, Canadian producer Royal DeMaria released five cases of Chardonnay icewine with a half-bottle price set at C$ 30,000, making it the world's most expensively priced wine.

=== China ===
China is the second largest global producer of ice wine, and produces approximately 40% of the world's ice wine, and with significant portions of the industry occurring in Gansu and Liaoning provinces, and smaller portions in Yunnan and Xinjiang. Cold weather in Gansu province requires the trenching of vines to prevent die-off, but the region has conditions that lead to resilience to rots and is low in industrial pollution.

=== Europe ===
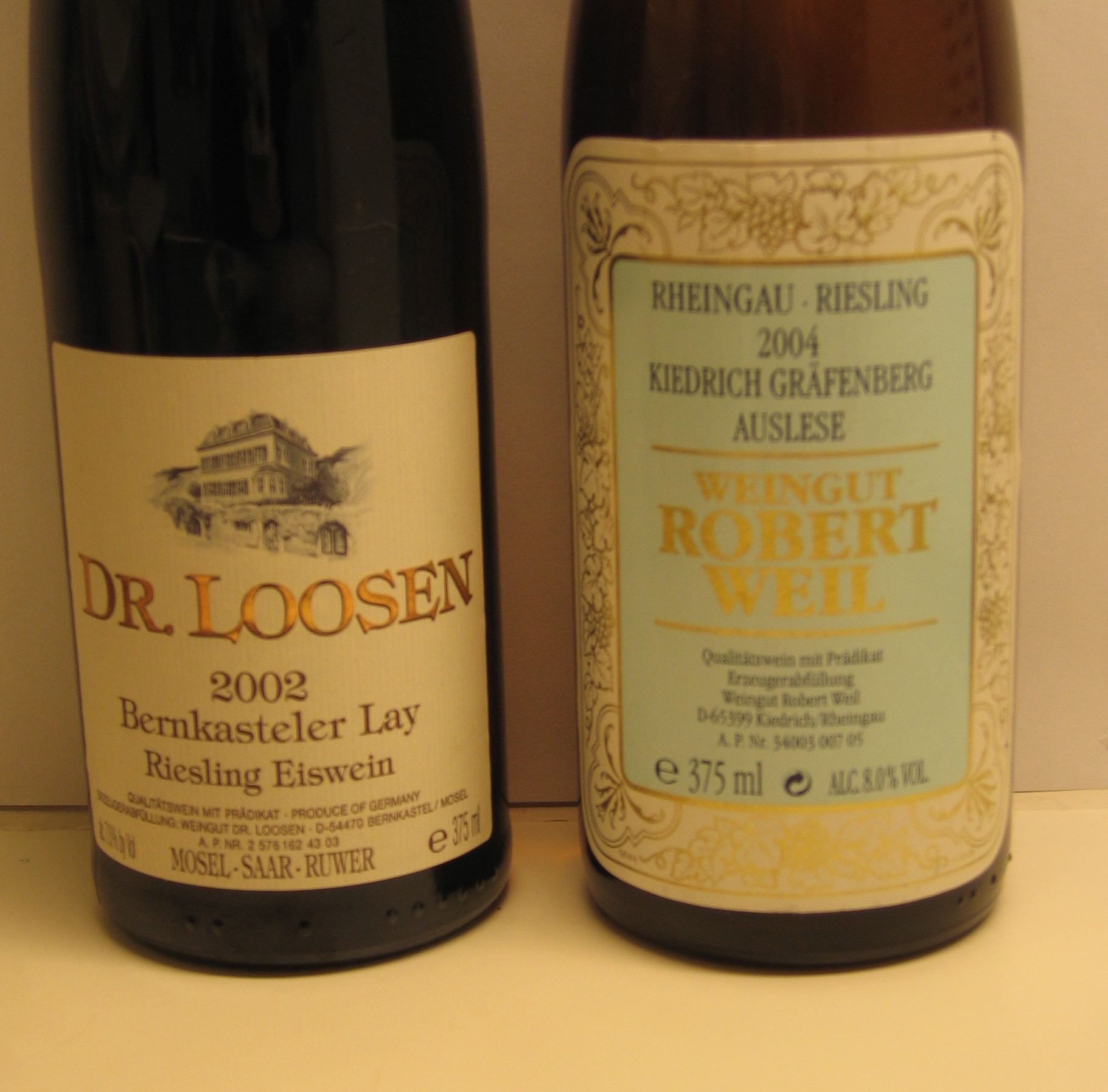
Icewine produced by Ernst Loosen, a Rhine Palatinate-based winery

The most famous (and expensive) icewines are German Eiswein, but icewine is also made in European countries such as Austria, Croatia, Czech Republic, Denmark, France, Georgia, Hungary, Italy, Lithuania, Luxembourg, Liechtenstein, Moldova, Poland, Romania, Slovakia, Slovenia, Spain, Sweden and Switzerland at least in smaller quantity. Eiswein is part of the Prädikatswein quality category in the German wine classification. The French language term Vin de glace is part of the wine classification in Luxembourg, but not in France, but is sometimes found on the rare bottles of icewine produced in Alsace. In most of France, the climate is too warm for icewine production.

=== Japan ===
The Furano region of Central Hokkaido, Japan, produces an icewine each winter at the Furano Winery. Because such a small amount can be made each year, it is produced in limited batches and sold only at the cellar door, 3.3 kilometres from Furano Station. The Furano Wine icewine is produced only in red.

=== United States ===
Northern Michigan wineries continue to follow the German laws that govern what wine qualifies as icewine, which dictates that icewine must be picked only when the grapes are frozen on the vine. In 2002, six Michigan wineries produced over 13,000 half-bottles of ice wine, a record at that time. A growing number of wineries near Lake Erie, especially in Pennsylvania, New York, and Ashtabula County, Ohio, also produce icewine.

The US law for icewines specifies that grapes must be naturally frozen. The TTB (Tax and Trade Bureau) regulations state that "Wine made from grapes frozen after harvest may not be labeled with the term 'icewine' or any variation thereof, and if the wine is labeled to suggest it was made from frozen grapes, the label must be qualified to show that the grapes were frozen postharvest."

== Production ==
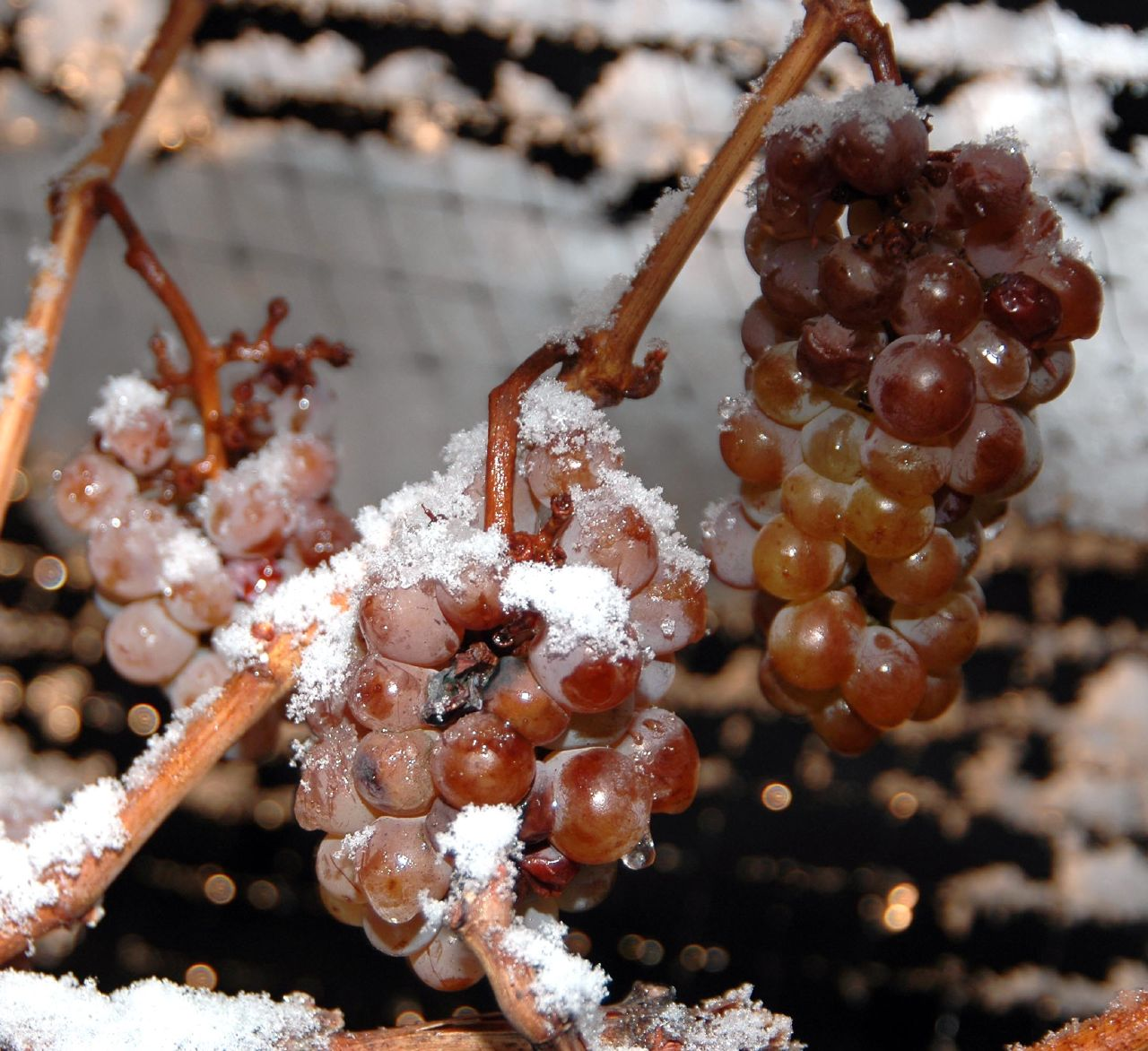
Ice wine grapes freezing over at a Niagara-based winery. Most ice wine producing countries require the grapes to be frozen naturally in order to receive its designation.

Natural icewines require a hard freeze (by law in Canada −8 °C (18 °F) or colder, and in Germany −7 °C (19 °F) or colder), to occur sometime after the grapes are ripe, which means that the grapes may hang on the vine for several months following the normal harvest. If a freeze does not come quickly enough, the grapes may rot and the crop will be lost. If the freeze is too severe, no juice can be extracted. Vineland Estates Winery in Ontario once broke their pneumatic press in the 1990s while pressing the frozen grapes because they were too hard (the temperature was close to −20 °C (−4 °F)). The longer the harvest is delayed, the more fruit will be lost to wild animals and dropped fruit. Since the fruit must be pressed while it is still frozen, pickers often must work at night or very early in the morning, harvesting the grapes within a few hours, while cellar workers must work in unheated spaces.

The high sugar level in the must leads to a slower-than-normal fermentation. It may take months to complete the fermentation (compared to days or weeks for regular wines) and special strains of yeasts should be used. Because of the lower yield of grape musts and the difficulty of processing, icewines are significantly more expensive than table wines. They are often sold in half-bottle volume (375 mL) or the even smaller 200ml bottle. New World wineries in particular sometimes bottle 200 mL and 50 mL gift packages.

=== Requirements ===
The minimum must weight requirements for icewine is as follows, in the measures used in the respective country:

- For German Eiswein, 110 to 128 degrees Oechsle, the same as for Beerenauslese, depending on the region (wine growing zone) and grape variety.
- For Austrian Eiswein, 25 degrees KMW, the same as for Beerenauslese, corresponding to 127 °Oechsle.
- For Canadian Icewine, 35 degrees Brix, corresponding to 153.5 °Oechsle.
- For Luxembourg Vin de glace, 120 °Oechsle.

=== Cryoextraction ===
In Austria, Germany, the US, and Canada, the grapes must freeze naturally to be called icewine. In other countries, some winemakers use cryoextraction (mechanical freezing) to simulate the effect of a frost and typically do not leave the grapes to hang for extended periods as is done with natural icewines.

Cryoextraction is the process by which grapes are frozen with refrigeration and pressed. Winemakers subject grapes to temperatures around 20 degrees Fahrenheit (or −7 degrees Celsius), and press them while still frozen. Ice crystals remain in the press, while concentrated juice flows out. The resulting wine resembles ice wine. The process of freeze distillation is similar in its concentrating effects, although it occurs after fermentation.

These non-traditional wines are sometimes referred to as "icebox wines". This may be in reaction to restrictions on using the term "ice wine", such as was ruled in the United States of America in 2002. An example is Bonny Doon's Vin de Glacière or King Estate's Vin Glace (made from Oregon Pinot gris grapes). German wine law entirely bans post-harvest freezing methods, even if not labeled "Eiswein".

== Grape varieties ==
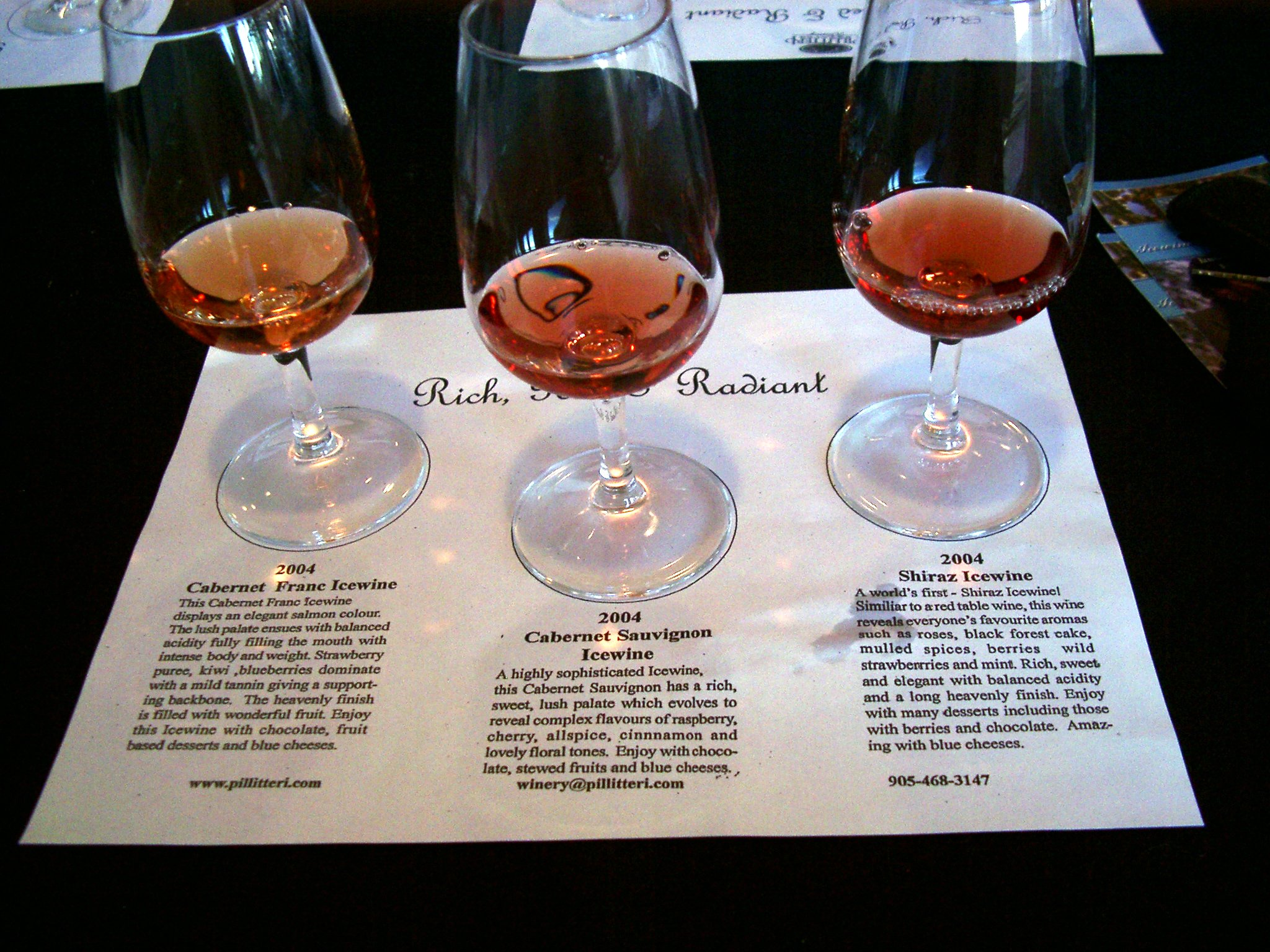
Examples of red grape ice wines, including Cabernet Franc, Cabernet Sauvignon, and Shiraz from the Niagara-based Pillitteri Estates Winery at a tasting in January 2006

Typical grapes used for icewine production are Riesling, considered to be the noblest variety by German winemakers; Vidal, highly popular in Ontario, Canada; and the red grape Cabernet Franc. Many vintners, especially from the New World, are experimenting with making icewine from other varieties: whites such as Seyval blanc, Chardonnay, Kerner, Gewürztraminer, Muscat Ottonel, Chenin blanc, Pinot blanc, and Ehrenfelser, or reds such as Merlot, Pinot noir, and even Cabernet Sauvignon. Pillitteri Estates Winery from the Niagara-on-the-Lake region of Ontario claim to be the first winery in the world producing Shiraz (Syrah) icewine with the 2004 vintage, Semillion, and Sangiovese in 2007.

Icewines from white varieties tend to be pale yellow or light gold in color when they are young and can maderise (acquiring a deep amber-golden color) as they age. The red varieties tend to have a light burgundy or even pink color like that of rosé wines, since the steeping of the skins in the pressed liquid typically used in red wine making is obviously not possible in ice wine production.

== Characteristics ==
Even though it is normal for residual sugar content in icewine to run from 180 g/L up to as high as 320 g/L (with a mean in the 220 g/L range), icewine is very refreshing (as opposed to cloying) due to high acidity. (The titratable acidity in ice wine is almost always above 10 g/L.)

Icewine usually has a slightly lower alcohol content than regular table wine. Some Riesling icewines from Germany have an alcohol content as low as 6%. Icewines produced in Canada usually have higher alcohol content, between 8 and 13 percent. In most years, icewines from Canada generally have higher brix degree (must weight) compared to those from Germany. This is largely due to the more consistent winters in Canada. Must with insufficient brix level cannot be made into icewine, and is thus often sold as "special select late harvest" or "select late harvest" at a fraction of the price that true icewine commands.

== See also ==
- Bletting – Process of softening that certain fleshy fruits undergo, beyond ripening
- Fractional freezing – Separating components of a mixture by their melting points
- Ice cider – Fermented beverage made from the juice of frozen apples
