= Reif Estate Winery =

Winery in Niagara-on-the-Lake, Ontario, Canada

Coordinates: 43.21758°N 79.06166°W

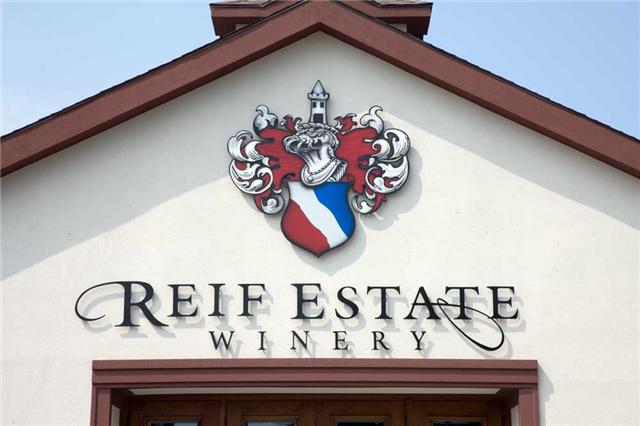
- Location: Niagara-on-the-Lake, Canada
- Appellation: Niagara Peninsula
- Founded: 1982
- First vintage: 1982
- Key people: Ewald Reif, Klaus W. Reif, Roberto DiDomenico
- Cases/yr: 35,000
- Known for: First Growth Collection

Reif Estate Winery is located in Niagara-on-the-Lake in Ontario, Canada. Reif Estate is primarily known for playing an important in role pioneering the Ontario wine Industry, as well as planting some of the first Vitis vinifera vines in the Niagara region.

== History ==
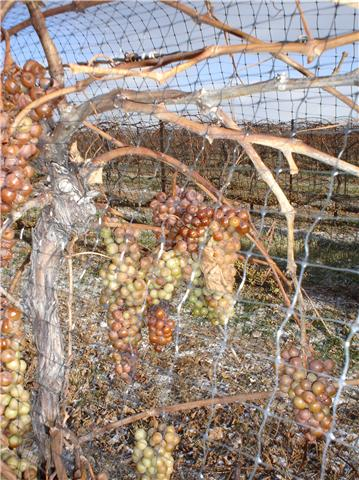
Vidal grapes intended for the production of ice wine.

Before Reif Estate Winery settled on the banks of the Niagara River, the family tradition of winemaking traces back 13 generations, starting in Germany. The Reif family tradition of winemaking began in the 17th century in a small winemaking town called Neustadt, Germany.

In 1977, Ewald Reif moved to Canada and purchase a plot of land, where the winery is still situated today. After purchasing the land, Ewald began uprooting existing Vitis labrusca grapes that were planted on the property, replacing them with Vitis vinifera vines. Ewald opened Reif Estate Winery in 1982. The winery's first vintages in 1982 included Riesling, Gewürztraminer and Vidal. In 1984 Reif produced its first Icewine.

In 1987, Klaus W. Reif took over from his uncle Ewald as President and Winemaker at Reif Estate Winery. In 2024, Eric Pearson became winemaker.

== Vineyard ==
Reif Estate's 125-acre (0.51 km^{2}) vineyard is located in Niagara Peninsula appellation, in the Niagara River sub-appellation. The Niagara River sub-appellation is characterized by its east facing slopes, offering grape varieties necessary sun exposure during the day. In addition, the Niagara river acts as a convective current which moderates vineyard temperatures and ultimately extends the growing season. The number of degree days in the Niagara River sub-appellation is 1470. Some of the first vines grown on the Estate included Chardonnay, Cabernet Sauvignon and Riesling.

White Varieties include: Chardonnay, Chenin blanc, Gewürztraminer, Pinot grigio, Riesling, Sauvignon blanc and Vidal.

Red Varieties include: Cabernet Franc, Cabernet Sauvignon, Merlot, Pinot noir, Gamay noir, and Syrah.

== Milestones ==
1977	Vineyard founded by Ewald Reif
1982	Winery opens and is housed in 1870s coach house
1987	Klaus and Sabina Reif move to Canada to take over the reins
1988	Robert Parker Jr. names 1987 Vidal Icewine on top ten wine list
1989	Winemaker Roberto DiDomenico joins Reif
1991	New production facility and underground barrel cellar opens
1997	Tesoro takes Gold at International Wine & Spirit Competition
2002	Best Canadian Winery at Wine & Spirit International Competition
2004	Vidal Icewine is Wine of the year at Ontario Wine Awards
2005	First Growth Collection is released showcasing Reif terroir
2007	Best Meritage at Cuvee for 2002 First Growth Cabernet Merlot; Three Gold's presented at Ontario Wine Awards; Best Sweet Wine Trophy awarded at Cuvée for Vidal Icewine; Installation of Wine Sensory Garden to commemorate 25 years of winemaking
2008	Best Sweet Wine Trophy awarded at Cuvée for Vidal Icewine; Grand Opening of New Wine Boutique
2009	Launch of TREND wine collection Production of Niagara Raisins, a first in Canada; First vintage of kiln dried wines including passito-style botrytis-affected wines
2010	Klaus W. Reif receives Lifetime achievement award from Ontario Wine Society

== Winemakers ==
Klaus W. Reif was born in the winemaking region of Neustadt, Germany. Klaus was also born into a long line of winemakers in his family, dating back 13 generations. In 1978, Klaus traveled to Canada to visit his Uncle Ewald Reif. Inspired by this visit, Klaus applied to one of Germany's most prestigious winemaking schools, the Geisenheim Institute. Klaus obtained a degree in Oenology and Viticulture, and then moved to Niagara-on-the-Lake, Canada. In 1987 Klaus became President and Winemaker of Reif Estate Winery.

Roberto DiDomenico's father was a winemaker, and Roberto was a winemaker's assistant when he was growing up. In 1985, Roberto attended the University of Guelph and studied Microbiology, focusing on fermentation technology. While a student, Roberto interned at Reif Estate Winery as a research assistant. After graduating in 1989, he joined the winery as winemaker and is still with the winery today.
